= Soke of Peterborough =

Historic area of England

Coordinates: 52.5833°N 0.2500°W

- 1889–1965
- Coat of arms

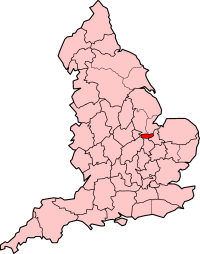
- Soke of Peterborough shown within England, with 1890 borders
- Capital: Peterborough
- Area
  - 1901: 216.37 km^{2} (83.54 sq mi)
  - 1961: 216.37 km^{2} (83.54 sq mi)
- Population
  - 1901: 41,122
  - 1961: 74,758
- Status: Administrative county of the United Kingdom
- Government: Soke of Peterborough County Council
  - Motto: Cor Unum (One Heart)
- History
  - Established: 1889
  - Disestablished: 1965
| Succeeded by |
| Huntingdon and Peterborough |

The Soke of Peterborough is a historic area of England associated with the City and Diocese of Peterborough. It was part of Northamptonshire, but was administered by its own county council, while the rest of Northamptonshire was administered by Northamptonshire County Council. The Soke was also described as the Liberty of Peterborough, or as the Nassaburgh hundred, and comprised, besides Peterborough, about thirty parishes. The Soke was abolished in 1965.

The area formed much of the present City of Peterborough unitary authority area in the post-1974 ceremonial county of Cambridgeshire. The Church of England dioceses of Peterborough and Ely still, however, follow the boundary of the Soke, with only the part of the city that is north of the River Nene lying within the Diocese of Peterborough, while urban areas south of the Nene, including Stanground and Fletton, are in the Diocese of Ely.

The term soke refers to a general legal term in medieval England referring to various concepts, including a jurisdiction of land or rights to hold a court or receive fines.

== History ==
In the Anglo-Saxon period, the lord of the hundred had the power, or liberty, of holding a court and administering justice within its boundaries, and this system was subsequently continued by the Abbots of Peterborough, who either enforced in person, as lords, the observance of the ancient socage laws and customs, or appointed a deputy to act for them. On the establishment of quarter sessions in 1349, the separate jurisdiction of the Soke was still maintained as distinct from that of the county of Northampton; and, except for parliamentary purposes and matters relating to the militia, it was entirely independent of that county. Quarter sessions for the liberty were held at the Sessions House in Peterborough, and petty sessions at the same place.

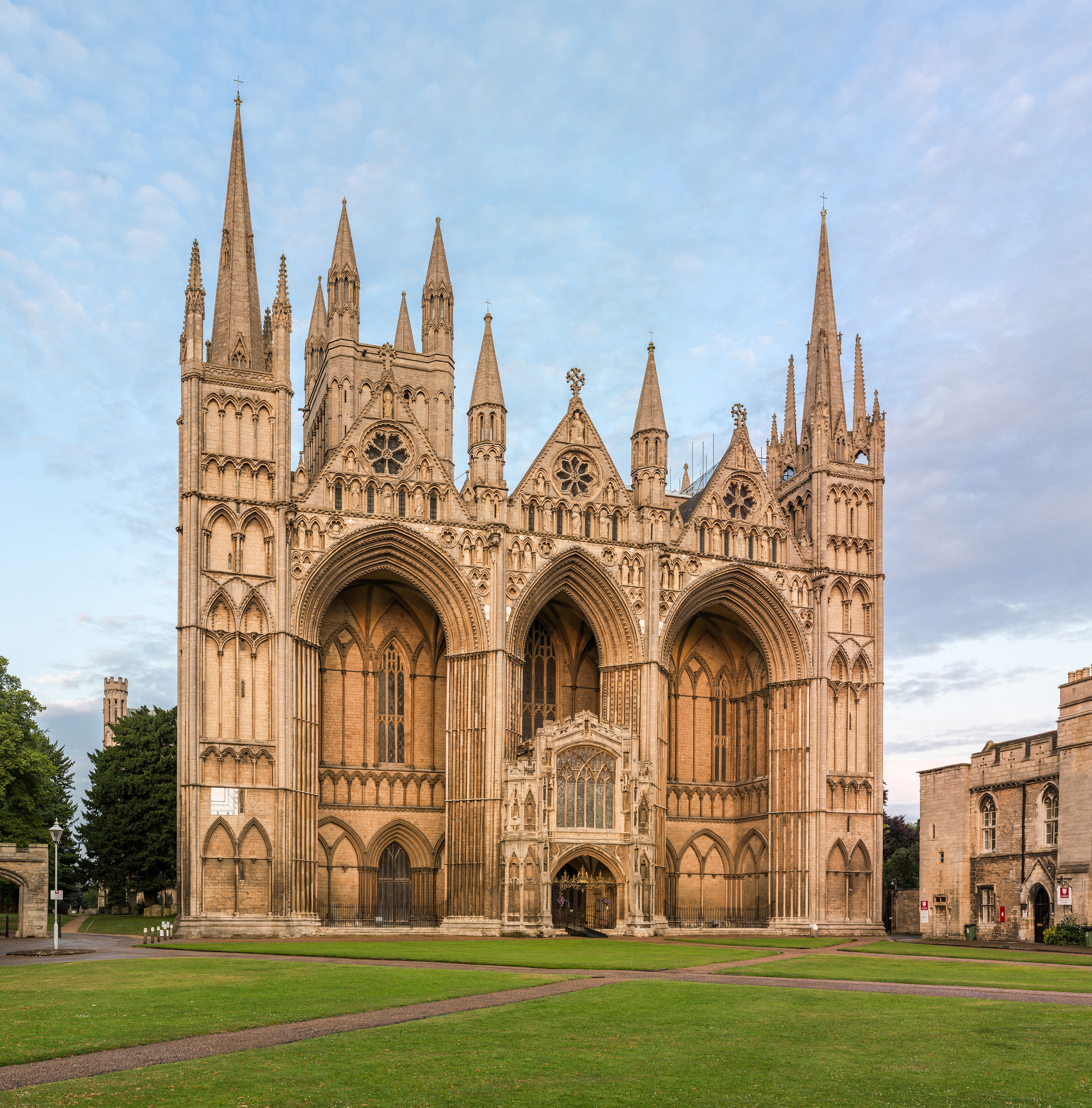
The Cathedral Church of St Peter, St Paul and St Andrew (1118–1238), West front

The civil government of the liberty was vested in the Marquess of Exeter, as Lord Paramount of Peterborough and custos rotulorum; around 40 magistrates appointed by the crown; and a high bailiff of the city appointed by the dean and chapter of Peterborough Cathedral. The soke had its own magistrates, who were appointed by the lord paramount, acting under a commission of oyer and terminer, and gaol delivery, as well as under the ordinary commission, and the magistrates for the liberty retained the power of hanging a criminal in cases of murder, which in fact they exercised so late as 1812. The Local Jurisdictions Act 1820, though giving the liberty bench the power to commit (for murder only) to the Northampton county assizes, did not abridge their full rights of gaol delivery. The soke had also a separate rate, out of which all payments were made.

In the provisions of the County and Borough Police Act 1856 (19 & 20 Vict. c. 69), the Weights and Measures Act 1878 (41 & 42 Vict. c. 49) and the Contagious Diseases (Animals) Act 1878 (41 & 42 Vict. c. 74), the Liberty of Peterborough, like that of the Isle of Ely, was in each instance treated as a separate county. Under the 1856 act a police force, the Liberty of Peterborough Constabulary, was appointed by and under the control of the magistrates of the soke. In 1874, the City of Peterborough was granted a charter of incorporation, under which a separate Peterborough City Police was overseen by the watch committee of the new city council. The Liberty Constabulary and City Police were amalgamated in 1947 to form the Peterborough Combined Police Force.

== Government ==
=== Quarter sessions ===
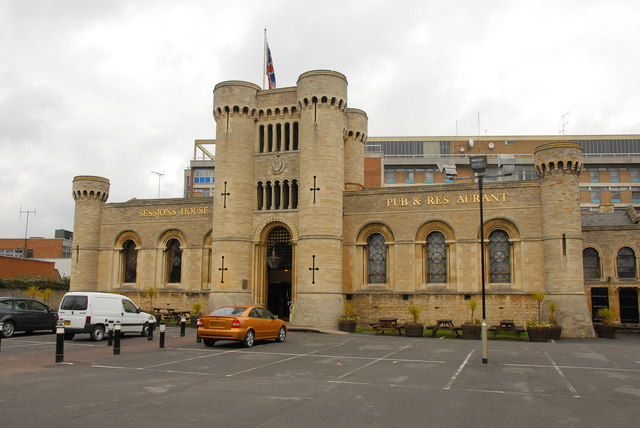
Sessions House (1842), Thorpe Road, Peterborough; W. J. Donthorne, architect

The liberty justices in quarter sessions had long-held powers in excess of those of most other quarter sessions. They could try and decide many serious crimes, including treason and murder, which normally could only be heard and determined in a court of assize, and in view of the special powers of the liberty justices, a judge of assize had no power to act in the Soke of Peterborough. Until the time of the Dissolution of the Monasteries, the abbot had been empowered to appoint justices of the peace for the Hundred, or Liberty, of Nassaburgh. When Peterborough Monastery was dissolved in 1539 Abbot Chambers was made the first Bishop of Peterborough, and the following year Henry VIII granted three Commissions of the Peace to the coterminous Liberty of Peterborough. They were:

- The Commission of the Peace for the appointment of Justices to sit in Petty Sessional Courts and exercise the ordinary duties of the magistracy;
- The Commission for Gaol Delivery, and
- The Commission of Oyer and Terminer, that is to hear and determine, which empowered the Justices of the Liberty to hear assize offences at Quarter Sessions.

The last commission gave to the justices of the liberty, power to enquire more fully "... by the oath of good and lawful men of the Liberty of Peterborough, by whom the truth of the matter may be better known and by other ways, means and methods by which they shall or better know, of the treasons ... insurrections ... rebellions, counterfeitings, clippings, wastings, false comings ... murders, felonies, manslaughters ... and many other grave offences mentioned therein which in other counties are only triable by a judge of assize, and the Justices are commanded at days appointed for this purpose to make diligent enquiries into and to hear and determine the above mentioned offences."

In 1877 Queen Victoria confirmed these commissions and endorsed the ancient privileges of jurisdiction of the liberty justices and at the same time excluded the High Sheriff of Northamptonshire from exercising his authority in the soke. The commissions of oyer and terminer and gaol delivery were not renewed by the monarchs immediately succeeding Queen Victoria and in 1920 the Court of Criminal Appeal quashed a conviction recorded at Peterborough Quarter Sessions. It was held that three of the liberty magistrates adjudicating at the hearing were not in order, as the assize authority of the court then derived from commissions granted during the reign of Queen Victoria. The three justices in question had been appointed to the commission of the peace subsequent to her death and only justices appointed during her reign were in order in adjudicating at such a court. This resulted in a renewal of the commissions in continuation of the ancient assize jurisdiction, and an announcement was made at the Easter Quarter Sessions in 1921 that "whatever may have happened as a result of a recent case in the Court of Criminal Appeal by authority of this Commission now granted, this Court will continue to exercise this ancient jurisdiction in the same manner as it has done under similar commissions since the days of Charles I." In fact, the justices of the liberty did not exercise their full powers, although they were always jealous of their special and historic privileges.

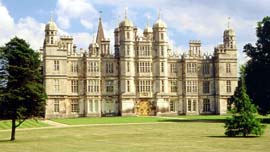
Burghley House (1555–1587), seat of the Marquesses of Exeter

In 1949, the Marquess of Exeter moved an amendment in the House of Lords to the Justices of the Peace Bill. This was necessary to safeguard the special position of the liberty jurisdiction as the new Bill provided there should be a separate commission of the peace for every administrative county and county borough and not for any other area. Accordingly, an amendment was accepted by the Lord Chancellor and the following paragraph was included in the Act:

SAVING FOR SOKE OF PETERBOROUGH: The Justices for the Soke of Peterborough shall, by virtue of the Commission of the Peace and without any further commission, have within the county the same jurisdiction as before the coming into force of Section 10 of this Act the Justices for the Liberty of Peterborough had within the Liberty by virtue of the commissions of oyer and terminer and gaol delivery customarily issued to those Justices, but as respects any matters within their competence as Justices of the Peace, shall act as such and not as Justices of Oyer and Terminer or Justices of Gaol Delivery.

In accepting the amendment the Lord Chancellor said that in murder cases this ancient jurisdiction had survived all these years only because it had never been exercised and he added, "if the justices ever appear to act upon the powers they possess, I shall be the first to come and remove those powers for them."

The courts of assize and quarter sessions were eventually abolished in England and Wales by the Courts Act 1971 and replaced by a single permanent Crown Court.

=== Administrative county ===
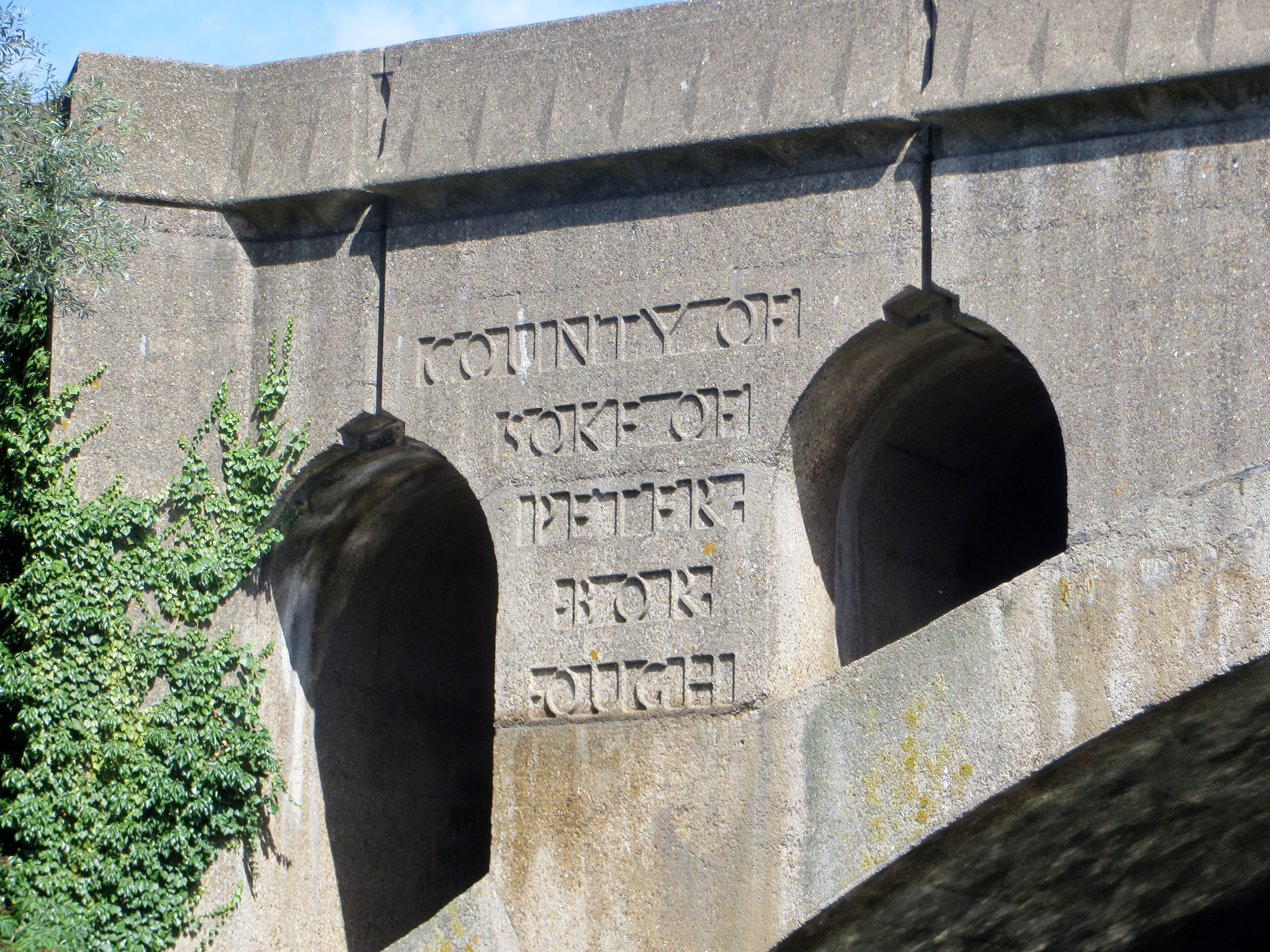
"County of Soke of Peterborough" on a 1920s Great North Road bridge over the River Nene at Wansford; the southern end has "County of Huntingdon"

Under an amendment by Lord Exeter to the Local Government Act 1888, the Soke became a separate administrative county in its own right, distinct from the remainder of Northamptonshire. An elected county council, consisting of a chairman, 10 aldermen, and 30 councillors, took over the administrative functions of the Quarter Sessions and had its meetings at the Guildhall; but this formal change hid a great deal of continuity, as Justices of the Peace were often elected councillors, the Clerk of the Peace became the Clerk to the Council and so on. During its life the county council gradually acquired more powers, such as taking over the functions of school boards in 1902, boards of guardians in 1930 and various town planning and housing responsibilities from 1949. As the fire authority, under the Fire Services Act 1947, the county council also retained Peterborough Volunteer Fire Brigade, one of the few of its kind.

The Soke county council was granted a coat of arms by the College of Arms in 1950. The design placed the crossed keys of Saint Peter from the arms of the Diocese of Peterborough on the silver and blue barry field of the arms of the Cecil family, Marquesses of Exeter, who held the chairmanship of the council for most of its existence. The crest was an ermine lion from the Cecil arms rising from a mural crown emblematic of local government. The lion held two wheatears, symbolising agriculture. The Latin motto adopted by the council was Cor Unum, part of the Cecil motto Cor Unum, Via Una or "One Heart, One Way".

The Local Government Act 1894 divided the Soke into three districts; the existent city (1541) and municipal borough (1874) of Peterborough, and the two rural districts of Peterborough and Barnack. The administrative county had an area of approximately 83 ½ square miles (216.37 km^{2}) with only one, minor, boundary change in its lifetime.

The county's population recorded at each census since 1901 was as follows:

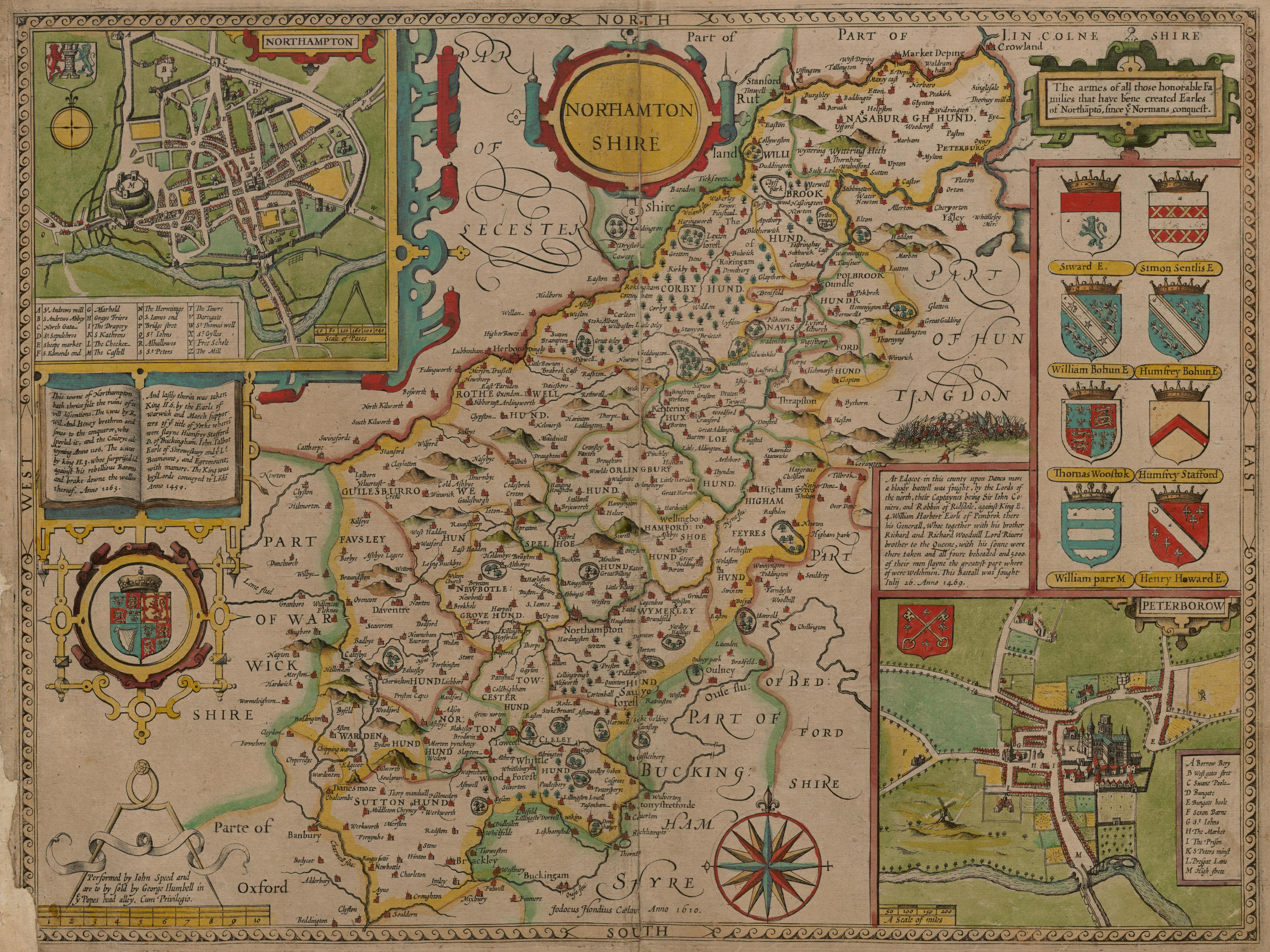
John Speed's seventeenth-century map of Northamptonshire including the Soke (as "Nasaburgh Hund.")

| Year | Population |
|---|---|
| 1901 | 41,122 |
| 1911 | 44,718 |
| 1921 | 46,959 |
| 1931 | 51,839 |
| 1941 | 58,303 |
| 1951 | 63,791 |
| 1961 | 74,758 |

In 1961, the last year for which figures are available, the breakdown was as follows:

| District | Population | Area (acres) |
|---|---|---|
| Peterborough MB | 62,340 | 10,023 |
| Peterborough RD | 7,992 | 28,186 |
| Barnack RD | 4,426 | 15,256 |

The Soke had a very small population for a county and so, in 1965, the administration was merged with that of the neighbouring small county of Huntingdonshire, to form the slightly more viable administrative county of Huntingdon and Peterborough (population 202,622 in 1971). Under the 1974 local government reorganisation, Huntingdon and Peterborough became part of the non-metropolitan county of Cambridgeshire (population 436,441 in 1981), as had first been proposed in 1947 and an area broadly corresponding to the Soke, called the City of Peterborough, became one of its six districts. When the new Cambridgeshire county council was granted arms in 1976 it included references to those of the Soke; two keys around the neck of the dexter supporter and the motto, Corde Uno Sapientes Simus, or "With One Heart Let Us Be Men of Understanding".

In 1998 the City of Peterborough became a unitary authority, but it continues to form part of Cambridgeshire for ceremonial purposes. Because of intervening development and a new town project in Peterborough, the present district has a much larger population than the Soke had.

== Civil parishes over time ==
When parishes began to be established in the 11th and 12th centuries, the Soke (or Nassaborough Hundred within Northamptonshire as it was also known) consisted of the parishes of Barnack, Castor, Etton, Eye, Helpston, Marholm, Maxey, Northborough, Paston, Peakirk, Peterborough, Stamford (the parishes of All Saints and St Martin), Thornhaugh, Ufford, Wittering and Wothorpe, and the extra-parochial area of Borough Fen.

The following changes took place over time:

- During the Middle Ages:
  - Bainton created out of Ufford.
  - Glinton created out of Peakirk.
  - Wansford created out of Thornhaugh.
- 1434:
  - Stamford Baron All Saints abolished and merged into Stamford Baron St Martin.
- 1541 or thereabouts:
  - Peterborough Minster Close Precincts becomes extra-parochial upon Peterborough Abbey's being created a cathedral.
  - Wothorpe abolished and merged into Stamford Baron St Martin.
- 1822:
  - Newborough created out of part of Borough Fen.
- 1858 (Extra Parochial Places Act):
  - Borough Fen and Peterborough Minster Close Precincts become civil parishes.
- 1866 (Poor Law Amendment Act 1866: the legal definition of parish was changed to be those areas which maintained their own poor laws):
  - Ailsworth, Sutton and Upton created out of Castor.
  - Ashton created out of Ufford.
  - Deeping Gate created out of Maxey.
  - Gunthorpe, Walton and Werrington created out of Paston.
  - Pilsgate and Southorpe created out of Barnack.
  - Wothorpe re-created out of Stamford Baron St Martin.
- 24 March 1887:
  - Ashton abolished and merged into Bainton.
  - Pilsgate abolished and merged back into Barnack.
- 1889 (Local Government Act 1888):
  - The parishes in the Soke of Peterborough (Ailsworth, Bainton, Barnack, Borough Fen, Castor, Deeping Gate, Etton, Eye, Glinton, Gunthorpe, Helpston, Marholm, Maxey, Newborough, Northborough, Paston, Peakirk, Peterborough Minster Close Precincts, Peterborough St John the Baptist, Southorpe, Sutton, Thornhaugh, Ufford, Upton, Walton, Wansford, Werrington, Wittering, Wothorpe and the rural part of Stamford Baron St Martin) become a separate administrative county, as noted above. They are joined by parts of the parishes of Fletton and Woodstone, both previously wholly in Huntingdonshire, but now straddling the county boundary. That part of Stamford Baron St Martin lying within the boundaries of Stamford municipal borough is transferred to Lincolnshire, so that that parish also straddles two counties.
- 1894 (Local Government Act 1894): parishes are no longer allowed to straddle district, borough or county boundaries.
  - Peterborough is divided into Peterborough Within (the municipal borough) and Peterborough Without.
  - The parishes of Fletton and Woodstone are divided into Fletton Urban and Rural and Woodstone Urban and Rural respectively; the two Urban parishes within Peterborough municipal borough and the Soke of Peterborough, and the two Rural parishes in Huntingdonshire.
  - Stamford Baron St Martin is divided into a reduced Stamford Baron St Martin, within Lincolnshire, and St Martin's Without within the Soke of Peterborough.

Parishes and districts of the Soke of Peterborough in 1894

- 1 November 1908:
  - Longthorpe created out of part of Peterborough Without.
- 1 April 1929:
  - Fletton Urban, Gunthorpe, Longthorpe, Paston, Peterborough Without, Peterborough Within, Peterborough Minster Close Precincts, Walton, Werrington and Woodstone Urban are all merged into a single parish of Peterborough. (Peterborough Municipal Borough is expanded to cover the same area.)
- 1965:
  - The Soke is abolished and merged into the new county of Huntingdon and Peterborough.

== Politics ==
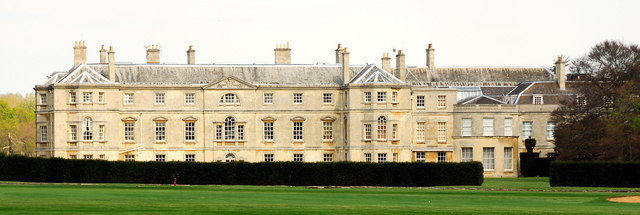
Milton Hall (1590–1610), seat of the Earls Fitzwilliam

For parliamentary purposes, the city formed a borough "by prescription," returning two Members of Parliament (MPs) from 1541, with the rest of the Soke being part of Northamptonshire parliamentary county. The Great Reform Act did not affect the borough, while the rural portion of the Soke was included in the northern division of Northamptonshire. The borough's representation was reduced to one member under the Redistribution of Seats Act 1885. In 1918 a new borough constituency was formed including the whole of the Soke and neighbouring parts of the administrative county of Northamptonshire. In 1948 the boundaries of the constituency were adjusted to correspond to those of the Soke and they remained much the same until 1970.

In the unreformed House of Commons in order to be either a candidate or an elector for a county seat, a man had to own (not rent) freehold property valued for the land tax at two pounds a year (women could neither vote nor stand for election). This was known as the 40 shilling freehold. The franchise for borough seats varied enormously. Peterborough was one of 37 boroughs in which suffrage was restricted to those paying scot and lot, a form of municipal taxation. In 1800 there were 2,000 registered voters in Northamptonshire and 400 in Peterborough. By 1835 this had risen to 576, or about one per cent of the population. The Fourth Reform Act widened suffrage by abolishing practically all property qualifications for men and by enfranchising women over 30 who met minimum property qualifications. This system, known as universal manhood suffrage, was first used in the 1918 general election.

== See also ==
- Anglican Diocese of Peterborough
- Peterborough (UK Parliament constituency)
- Local government in Peterborough
- History of Northamptonshire
