= Peterborough Rural District =

Former local government area in the UK

Coordinates: 52.570°N 0.244°W

Peterborough RD
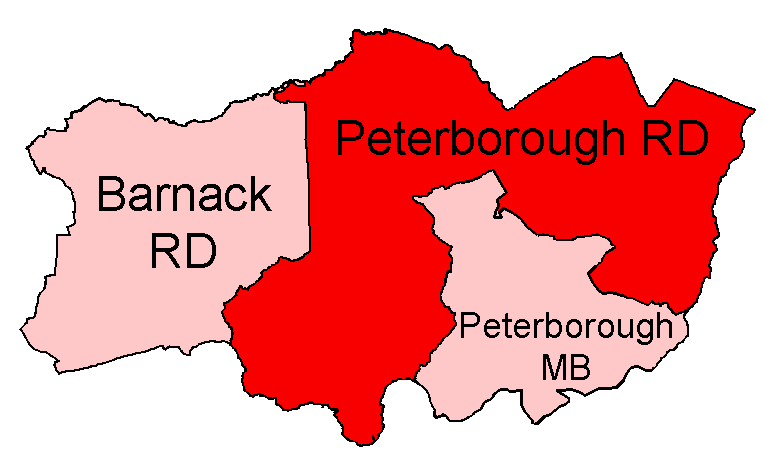
- Position within Soke of Peterborough
- Area
  - 1901: 36,330 acres (147.0 km^{2})
  - 1961: 28,186 acres (114.1 km^{2})
- Population
  - 1901: 8,277
  - 1961: 7,992
- History
  - Created: 1894
  - Abolished: 1974
  - Succeeded by: Peterborough
- Status: Rural district
  - HQ: Peterborough

Peterborough was a rural district adjoining the city and municipal borough of Peterborough, England, from 1894 to 1974. The council offices were at 51 Priestgate, in the city of Peterborough.

The rural district was created under the Local Government Act 1894, from the part of the Peterborough rural sanitary district that was in the administrative county of Soke of Peterborough (the rest, in Huntingdonshire, formed the Norman Cross Rural District).

In 1929 the city's boundaries were extended, with six of the rural district's parishes being absorbed.

Local government reorganisation abolished the Soke in 1965 and the rural district was transferred to the new administrative county of Huntingdon and Peterborough. The rural district was abolished under the Local Government Act 1972, becoming part of the Peterborough district of the new non-metropolitan county of Cambridgeshire.

== Civil parishes ==
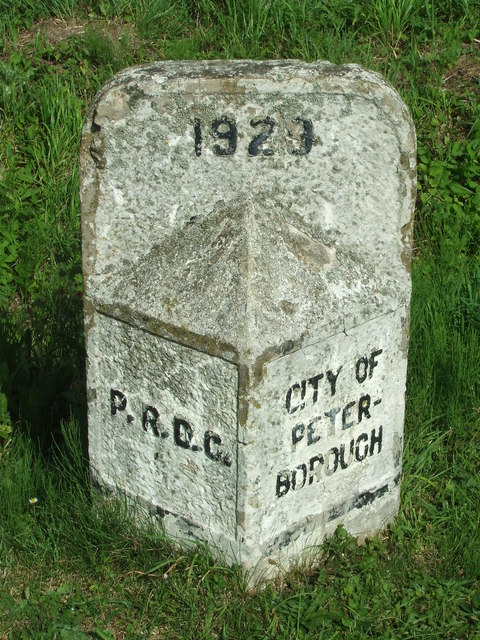
Post marking the boundary of the City and Rural District.

The rural district consisted of the following civil parishes:

- Ailsworth
- Borough Fen
- Castor
- Deeping Gate
- Etton
- Eye
- Glinton
- Gunthorpe (absorbed by the City of Peterborough in 1929)
- Helpston
- Longthorpe (created 1908 from part of Peterborough Without CP: absorbed by the City of Peterborough in 1929)
- Marholm
- Maxey
- Newborough
- Northborough
- Paston (absorbed by the City of Peterborough in 1929)
- Peakirk
- Peterborough Without (absorbed by the City of Peterborough in 1929)
- Sutton
- Upton
- Walton (absorbed by the City of Peterborough in 1929)
- Werrington (absorbed by the City of Peterborough in 1929)

== See also ==
- Barnack Rural District
- Local government in Peterborough
