= Thornhaugh =

Village in Cambridgeshire, England

Coordinates: 52.6°N 0.417°W

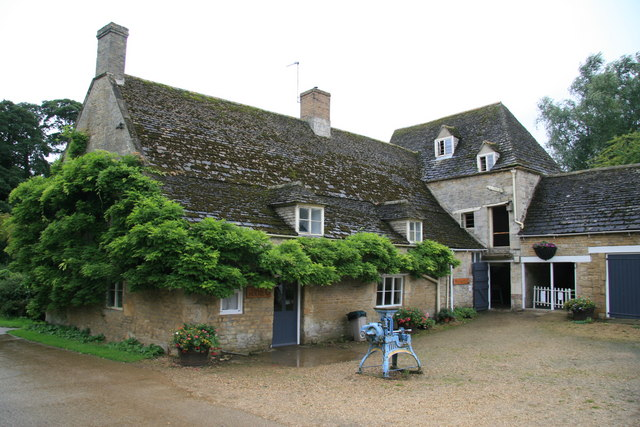
- Sacrewell Watermill, Thornhaugh

- Location within Cambridgeshire
- Population: 182
- Unitary authority: Peterborough
- Ceremonial county: Cambridgeshire
- Region: East
- Country: England
- Sovereign state: United Kingdom
- Post town: Peterborough
- Postcode district: PE8

Thornhaugh is a civil parish and village in the city of Peterborough unitary authority, Cambridgeshire in the United Kingdom. For electoral purposes the parish forms part of the Glinton and Wittering ward and is in the North West Cambridgeshire constituency. It was formerly in the Soke of Peterborough (and later Huntingdon and Peterborough).

Thornhaugh (or Thornhaw) is derived from Old English and means a thorn enclosed low-lying meadow beside a stream. There is evidence of a settlement here as far back as the 12th century, but probably has earlier origins. Although the village of Thornhaugh itself is quite small, the parish is one of the largest in the county of Cambridgeshire at 1,096.33 acres (443.67 ha). The parish is crossed by the A1 and A47 roads.

The village was declared a conservation area in 1979. The road that runs through the village is Russell Hill, named after William Russell, 1st Baron Russell of Thornhaugh who lived here. The Russell family are also associated with the Bedford Estate in Central London where you will find Thornhaugh Street and Russell Square in Bloomsbury.

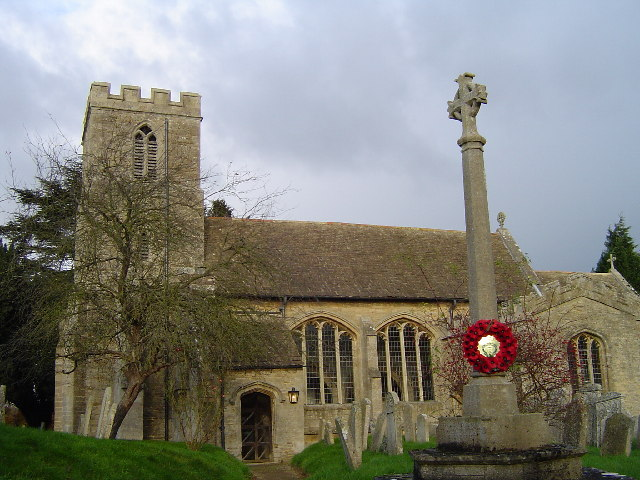
Parish Church of St Andrew, Thornhaugh

St Andrew's Church dates from the 12th century, although much restored in the 19th century. The village sign commemorates the first Baron Russell of Thornhaugh. Although the main village is close to the A1 road, there is a significant hamlet (Home Farm, Leicester Road, Thornhaugh) with a dozen houses about one mile west of the main village just off the A47 road, consisting of an old hunting lodge (now two houses) and associated farm buildings (all now residential).

Thornhaugh Hall was built in 1911 by Stanley Brotherhood; the architect was George A. Crawley. It was gutted by a fire in 1937 and restored. A later owner of the hall was Phillip Carter.

== St Andrew's Church ==
The Church of England parish church, St Andrew's, has fabric from the 12th century but was restored in 1889 by J. T. Micklethwaite, after a tree fell on the north aisle. The contractor was Rattee and Kett. It is a Grade I listed building.

The spire fell in about 1500, destroying the south aisle which was not rebuilt. The south wall of the nave has large four-light windows. The remaining bay of the south arcade opens to the south transept. The four-bay north arcade with double-chamfered arches and cruciform abacuses is late 12th-century. The west tower was rebuilt in 1889.

In the south transept is the tomb of Sir William Russell (died 1613), with recumbent effigy and kneeling figures of his three brothers and three sisters.

== Sacrewell ==
The Sacrewell Farm and Country Centre is in the parish, to the east of the A1. Sacrewell is named after a "sacred well" in Sacrewell field near Sacrewell Lodge. Some sort of mill probably existed here since the Roman occupation. Excavations have found two Roman villas, a corn drier and storage building - an ideal site being adjacent to Ermine Street and next to a spring. Three mills in the area were mentioned in the Domesday book, and it is likely that Sacrewell was one of them. A new watermill, mill house and farm were completed in 1755 and was originally called Curtis's Farm after William Curtis who died in 1779.

William Scott Abbott became a tenant at the farm during the First World War and expanded the farm operations. After his death his widow Mary carried on following her husband's dream. Her nephew David Powell took over the management of the farm in 1959 and in 1964 Mary Abbott founded the William Scott Abbott Trust. The vision was to provide an agricultural education for all and the educational values they promoted are still alive. The watermill remained a working mill until 1965, when it was no longer profitable, however, it has now been fully restored as a heritage working mill; a centre of milling excellence and an educational tool with a £1.4 million Heritage Lottery Fund grant. Sacrewell visitor centre was opened to the public in 1981 and the farm and watermill are now visitor attractions.

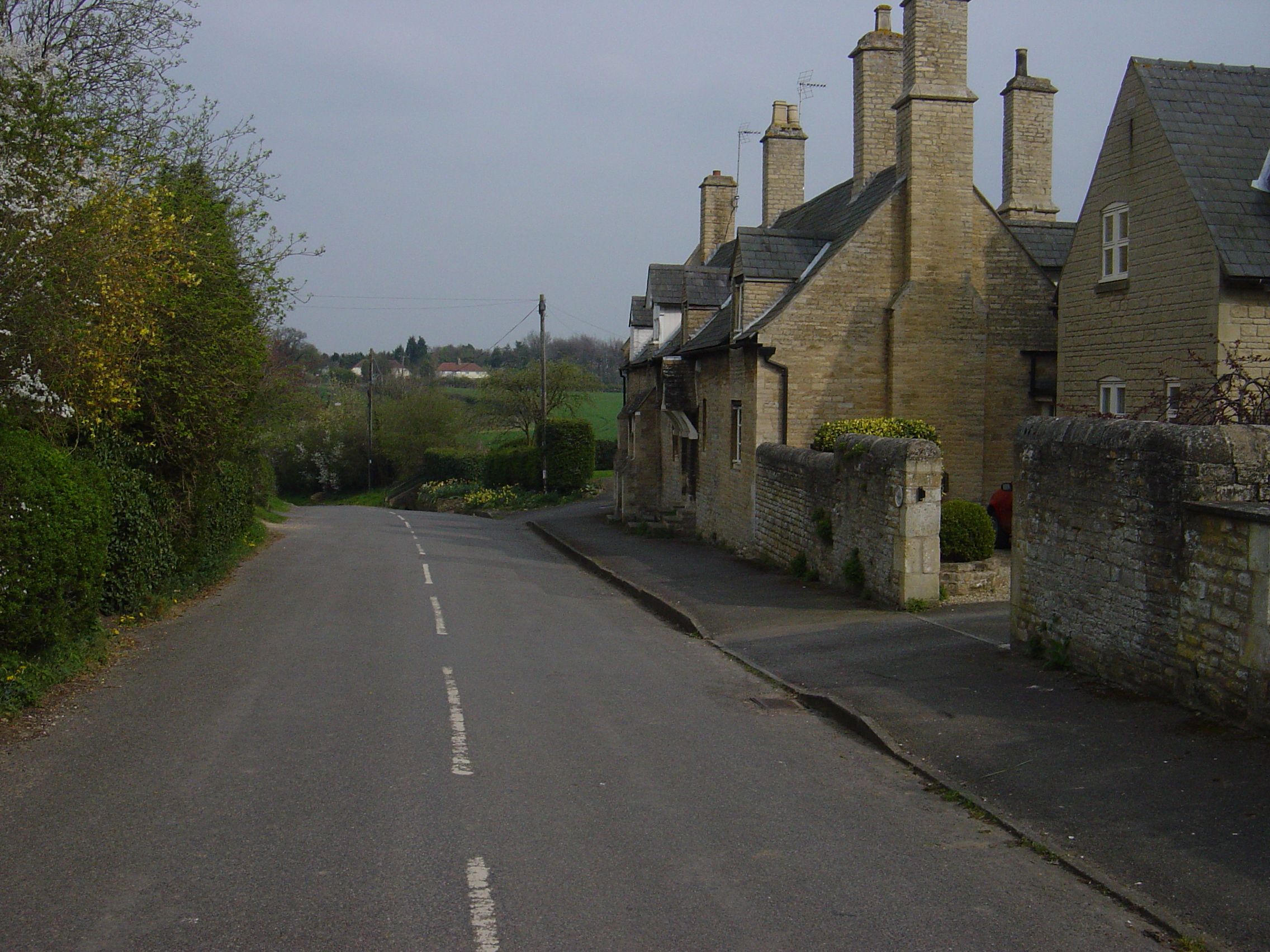
Russell Hill

== Bedford Purlieus ==
Within the parish of Thornhaugh is Bedford Purlieus National Nature Reserve, an historic woodland of 520 acres and part of the ancient Rockingham Forest. Up to the mid 1600s it was known as Thornhaugh Woods or the High Wood of Thornhaw. The name changed when the Dukes of Bedford took ownership renaming it Bedford Purlieus. English Nature declared the wood a National Nature Reserve in 2000, in recognition of its importance as a species-rich semi-natural native woodland. The wood is the most ecologically diverse wood in Britain and home to more plant and insect species than most other woods in this country. Muntjac and fallow deer are found on the reserve, and bird life includes nightingale, red kite, sparrowhawk, kestrel, little owl, tawny owl and long-eared owl. Reptiles at the site include adders, grass snakes, common lizards and slow worms. Bedford Purlieus is managed by English Nature and Forest Enterprise in partnership and is open to the public during daylight hours.

There is significant confirmation of Roman industrial occupation within the wood with many iron ore extraction pits and evidence of a bath house. It was featured on series 17 of television's Time Team in 2011.

During the Second World War, Bedford Purlieus was used as part of RAF Kings Cliffe for airmen's living accommodation which were dispersed around the woods to reduce the risk of being hit in the event of an air raid. Various foundations still remain. Buildings within Leedsgate Farm (private property) included the theatre, gym and chapel for the airbase.

== See also ==
- Baron Russell of Thornhaugh
