= Upton, Peterborough =

Village in Cambridgeshire, England

Coordinates: 52.5912°N 0.3672°W

Upton
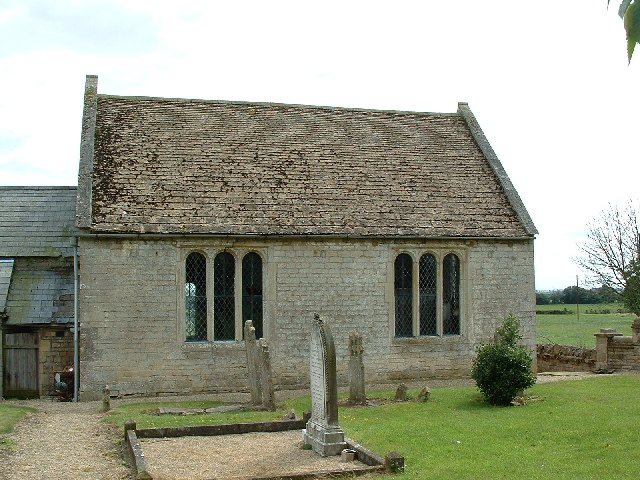
- St John the Baptist, Upton

- Location within Cambridgeshire
- OS grid reference: TF 107 005
- Unitary authority: Peterborough
- Ceremonial county: Cambridgeshire
- Region: East
- Country: England
- Sovereign state: United Kingdom
- Post town: Peterborough
- Postcode district: PE6
- Police: Cambridgeshire
- Fire: Cambridgeshire
- Ambulance: East of England
- UK Parliament: North West Cambridgeshire

Upton is a village and civil parish in the Peterborough district, in the ceremonial county of Cambridgeshire, England. For electoral purposes it forms part of Glinton and Wittering ward in North West Cambridgeshire constituency. The population of the parish is included in the civil parish of Sutton.

The Parish Church of St John the Baptist is a 12th-century Norman church with a north aisle rebuilt in 17th century. It was a chapel-of-ease and was built as a daughter church to St Kyneburgha's at Castor. The church is a Grade I listed building. It is set in the fields to the east of the village, 100 yards from the Roman King Street.
