= Stamford Baron St Martin =

Former civil parish in Lincolnshire, England

Coordinates: 52°38′58″N 0°28′39″W

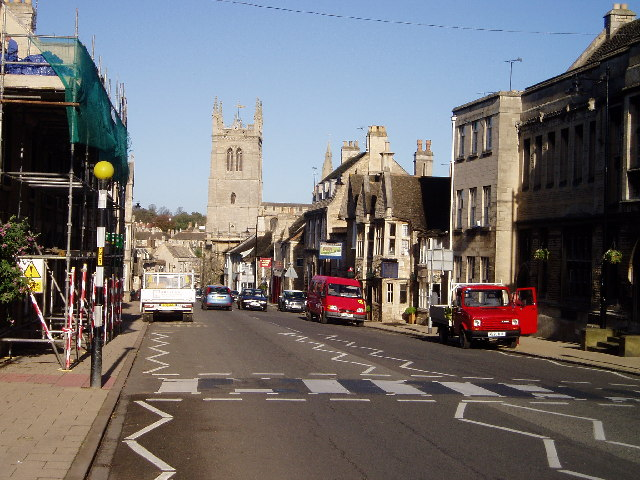
- High Street, St Martin's

- Location within Lincolnshire
- OS grid reference: TF 029 068
- Civil parish: Stamford
- District: South Kesteven
- Shire county: Lincolnshire
- Region: East Midlands
- Country: England
- Sovereign state: United Kingdom
- Post town: STAMFORD
- Postcode district: PE9
- Dialling code: 01780

Stamford Baron St Martin is a former civil parish, now in the parish of Stamford, in the South Kesteven district, in the county of Lincolnshire, England. It included the southern part of Stamford, south of the River Welland, and therefore historically part of Northamptonshire. In 1921 the parish had a population of 941. It remains an ecclesiastical parish used by the Church of England; the parish church is St Martin's.

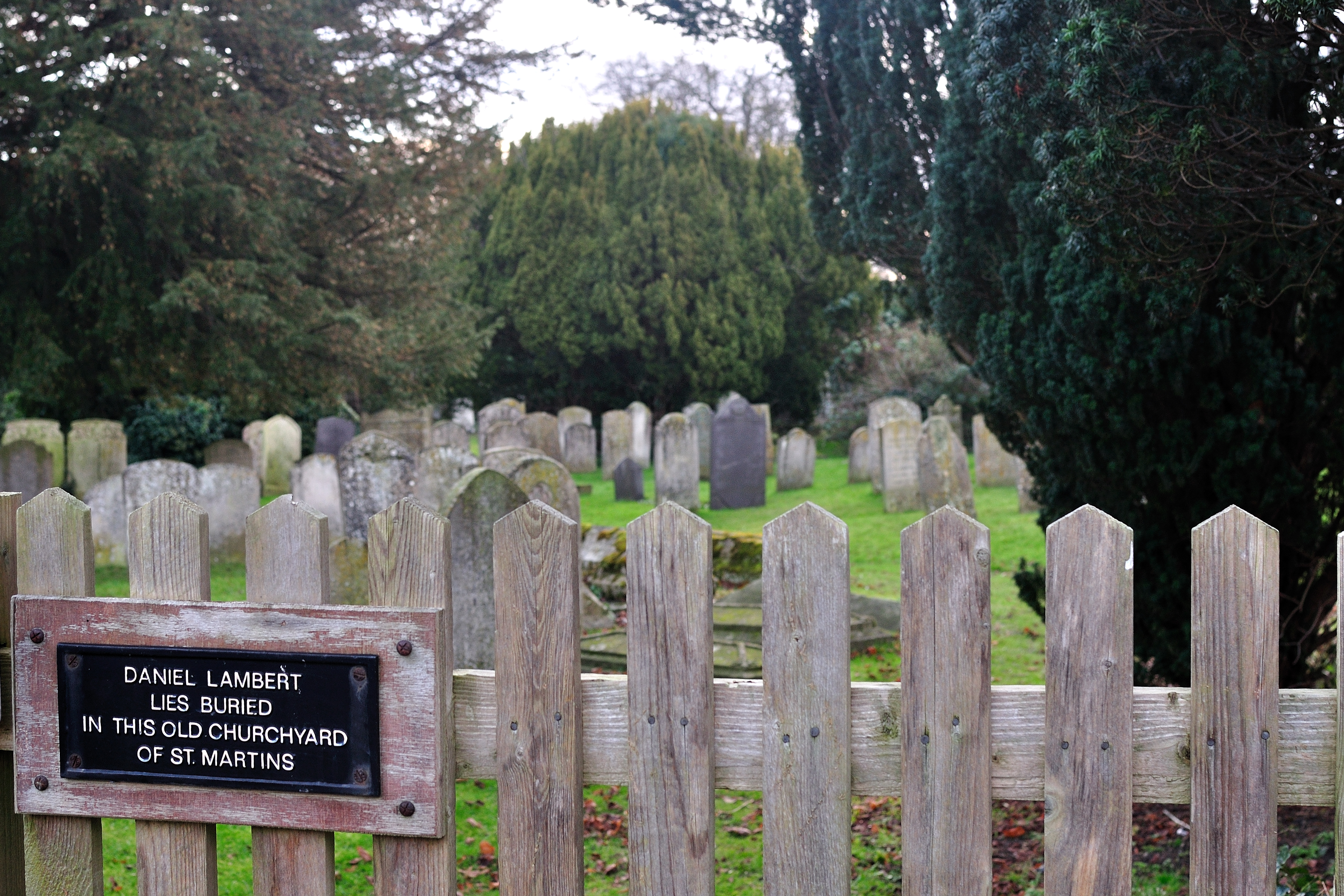
St Martin's church graveyard lies in the ecclesiastical parish of Stamford Baron St Martin. It contains the grave of Daniel Lambert

The Baron part of the name comes from the fact that the area was granted as a barony to the Abbot of Peterborough in the 15th century.

Stamford Baron was outside the borough boundaries of Stamford until 1836. The Stamford constituency was enlarged in 1832 to also include the built-up part of Stamford Baron. In 1836 Stamford was reformed to become a municipal borough, at which point the municipal boundaries were adjusted to match the recently enlarged constituency. The county boundary did not change at that time and so after 1836 the borough straddled Lincolnshire and Northamptonshire, with Stamford Baron being the part in Northamptonshire.

Wothorpe was a hamlet in the parish of Stamford Baron St Martin; it became a separate civil parish in 1866.

When elected county councils were established in 1889 boroughs were no longer allowed to straddle county boundaries, and so the part of the parish which was inside the borough of Stamford was transferred to Lincolnshire (becoming part of Kesteven), whilst the more rural rest of the parish remained in Northamptonshire (as part of the administrative county of the Soke of Peterborough). When parish and district councils were established in 1894 parishes were no longer allowed to straddle county boundaries and so the parish was split into St Martin's Without covering the parts of the old parish in Northamptonshire and a reduced parish which retained the Stamford Baron St Martin name covering the parts within the borough of Stamford in Lincolnshire.

On 1 October 1930 all the civil parishes within the borough of Stamford were merged to form one single Stamford parish (also taking in Stamford All Saints, Stamford St George, Stamford St John, Stamford St Mary, and Stamford St Michael). St Martin's Without and Wothorpe still exist as civil parishes, now in the City of Peterborough unitary authority area of Cambridgeshire.
