= Old Fletton Urban District =

Former local government area in the UK

Coordinates: 52.549°N 0.235°W

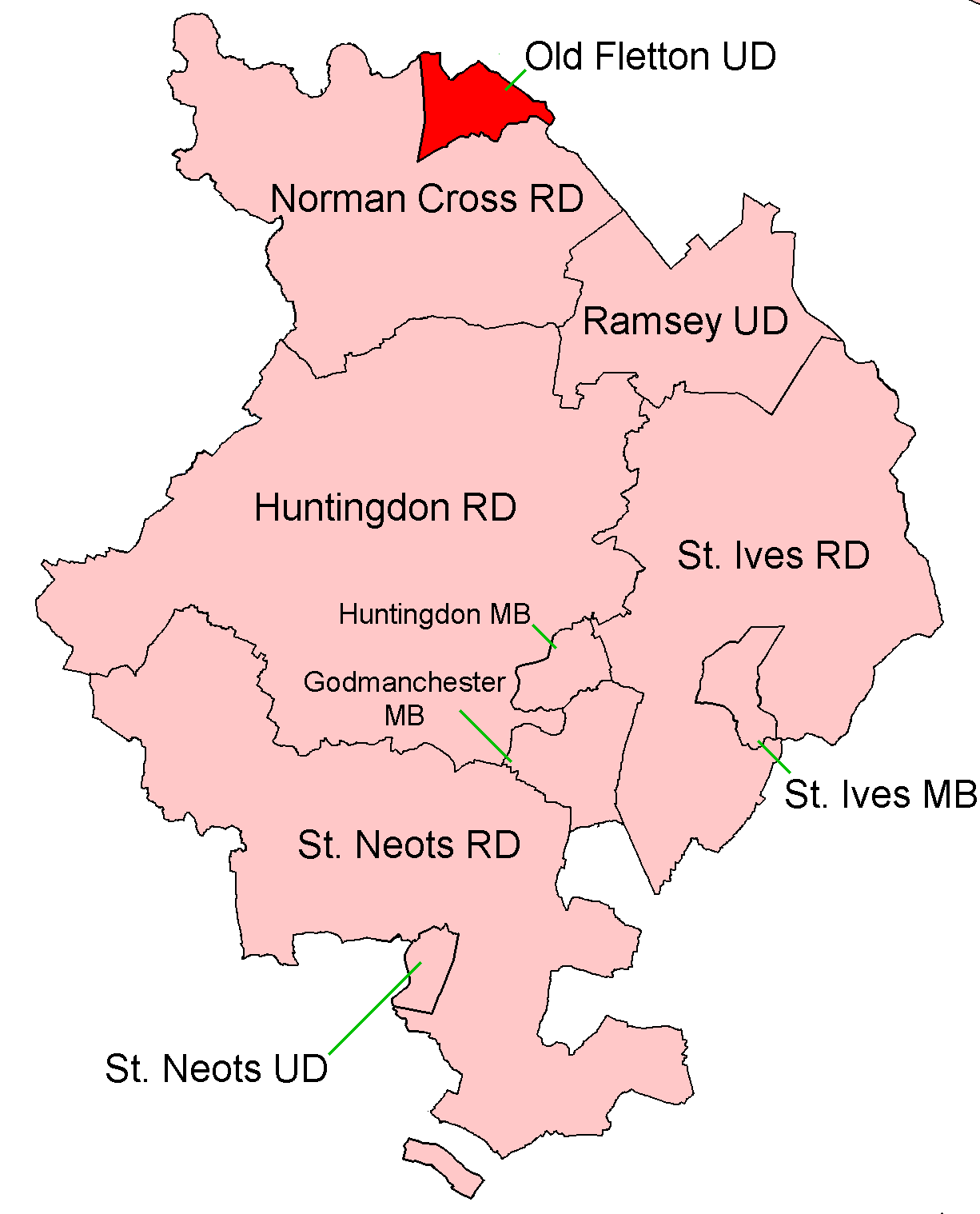
Position within Huntingdonshire

Old Fletton was an urban district in the county of Huntingdonshire and then (from 1965) Huntingdon and Peterborough. The urban district was abolished in 1974 under the Local Government Act 1972, and now forms part of the city of Peterborough in Cambridgeshire.

The urban district was created in 1905, incorporating the parishes of:

- Fletton (otherwise Fletton Rural or Old Fletton; Fletton Urban or New Fletton was placed in the Municipal Borough of Peterborough in 1894)
- Stanground South (separated from Stanground North in Thorney Rural District in 1905)
- Woodston (otherwise Woodston Rural; Woodston Urban was placed in the Municipal Borough of Peterborough in 1894)
