= Stanground North =

Coordinates: 52.562°N 0.213°W

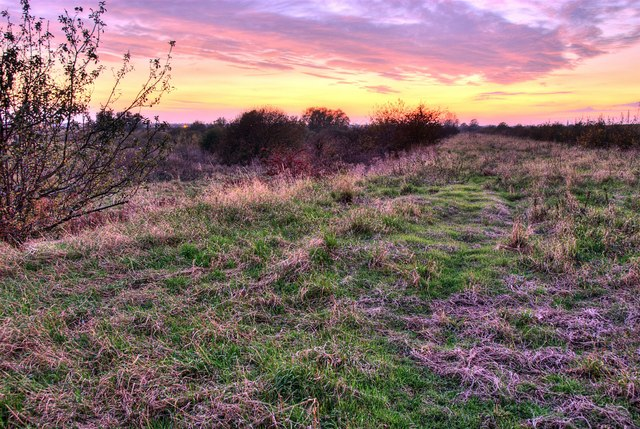

- Location within Cambridgeshire
- Population: 0 (2001 census)
- Unitary authority: Peterborough
- Shire county: Cambridgeshire
- Region: East
- Country: England
- Sovereign state: United Kingdom

Stanground North is a former civil parish in the Peterborough district, in the ceremonial county of Cambridgeshire, England. The 2001 census recorded a population of zero. The parish, which covered open fields on a flood plain of the River Nene, was abolished in 2004.

== History ==
The parish was originally created on 1 October 1905, when Stanground parish was divided into two (Stanground South became part of Old Fletton urban district), having hitherto been the only parish to still cross a county border. It had a peak population of 43 in the census of 1921.

Between 1905 and 1974, Stanground North was one of only two parishes in the Thorney Rural District. In 1974, it became part of the Peterborough district of Cambridgeshire. On 1 April 2004 the parish was abolished.
