= Pilsgate =

Hamlet in Cambridgeshire, England

Coordinates: 52.637592°N 0.426394°W

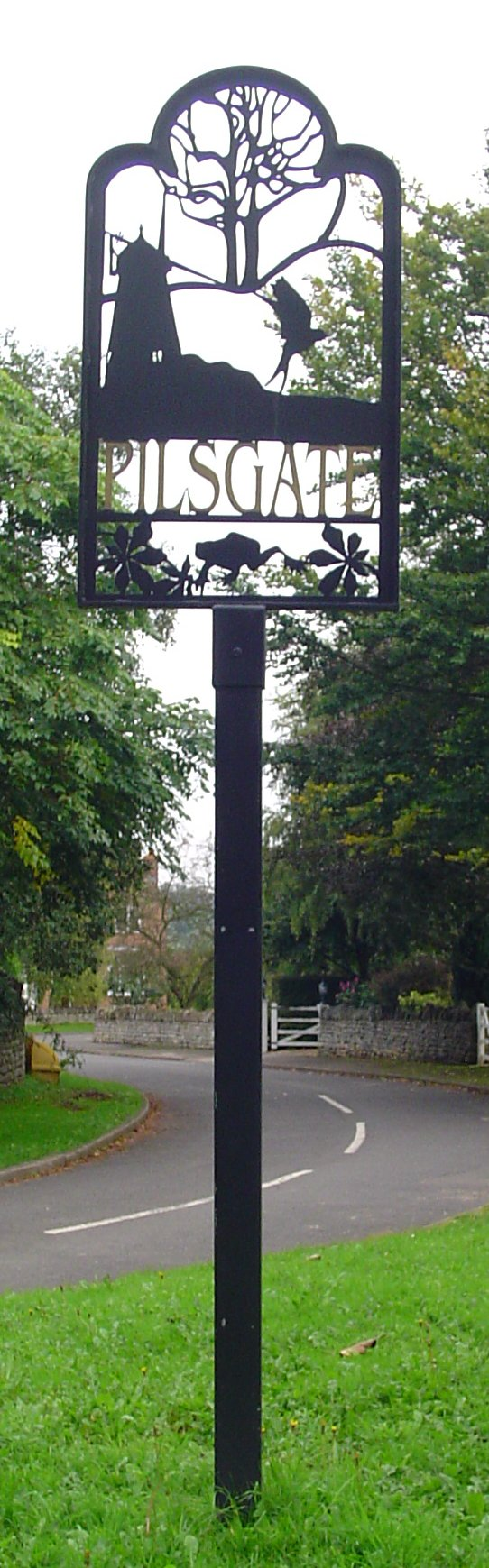
- Signpost in Pilsgate

- Location within Cambridgeshire
- Civil parish: Barnack
- Unitary authority: Peterborough
- Shire county: Cambridgeshire
- Region: East
- Country: England
- Sovereign state: United Kingdom
- Post town: STAMFORD
- Postcode district: PE9

Pilsgate is a hamlet and former civil parish, now in the parish of Barnack, in the Peterborough district, in the ceremonial county of Cambridgeshire, England. Pilsgate is close to the county boundary and 3 miles (5 km) south-east of Stamford, Lincolnshire. In 1881 the parish had a population of 125.

== History ==
Pilsgate was recorded in the Domesday Book as Pillesgate. From 1866 Pilsgate was a civil parish in its own right until it was abolished on 24 March 1887 and merged with Barnack.
