= Cambridgeshire and Isle of Ely =

Former administrative county of England

Coordinates: 52°13′N 0°06′E

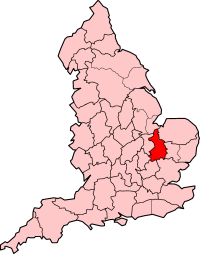
- Population
  - 1971: 303,042
- History
  - Created: 1965
  - Abolished: 1974
  - Succeeded by: Cambridgeshire
- Status: Administrative county
- Government: Cambridgeshire and Isle of Ely County Council
  - HQ: Cambridge
  - Motto: Sapientes Simus (Let us be men of wisdom)

Cambridgeshire and Isle of Ely was, from 1965 to 1974, an administrative county in East Anglia in the United Kingdom. In 1974 it became part of an enlarged Cambridgeshire.

== Formation ==
Map of the historical administrative boundaries in modern Cambridgeshire. Cambridgeshire and Isle of Ely, borders shown in red, covered the area of the current districts of Fenland, East Cambridgeshire, South Cambridgeshire, and the City of Cambridge.

The Local Government Act 1888 created four small neighbouring administrative counties in the east of England: Cambridgeshire, Isle of Ely, Huntingdonshire, and the Soke of Peterborough. Following the Second World War, a Local Government Boundary Commission was formed to review county-level administration in England and Wales. The commission was of the opinion that counties needed to have a population of between 200,000 and 1 million to provide effective services. Accordingly, they recommended the amalgamation of all four counties into a single entity. The commission's recommendations were not carried out, however.

The reform of local government was returned to in 1958, with the appointment of a Local Government Commission for England. The four counties were included in the East Midlands General Review Area, and the LGCE made its draft proposals in April 1960. The commission identified particular problems in the administration of Cambridgeshire, where the city of Cambridge had 50% of the population and over two-thirds of the rateable value of the county. Cambridge was large enough to qualify for county borough status and be removed from the administrative county, but it was felt that this would render the remainder of Cambridgeshire, which would consist of three rural districts, too small to effectively deliver local services. The LGCE made draft proposals to constitute Cambridge a county borough and create a new administrative county by merging the remainder of the county with the Isle of Ely, Huntingdonshire and the Soke of Peterborough. There was considerable opposition to the draft proposals, and the LGCE instead opted in its final report in 1961 to create two counties: Huntingdon and Peterborough, and Cambridgeshire and Isle of Ely, with Cambridge continuing to form part of the latter county.

The Cambridgeshire and Isle of Ely Order was made on 14 February 1964, and placed before the House of Commons on 9 March 1964. The amalgamation was opposed by Sir Harry Legge-Bourke, member of parliament (MP) for the Isle of Ely, noting that his constituents "in general were in favour of continuing with an independent county council with which they were entirely satisfied." Legge-Bourke asked why the Isle was to be abolished as a county, when Rutland was being retained, and went on to state that some parts of the area had more interests in common with Peterborough than with Cambridge. The MP for Cambridge, Sir Hamilton Kerr, also objected to the creation of the new county, advocating the original draft proposals and the elevation of his constituency to become a county borough. Nevertheless, the order was approved by 144 votes to 84.

The new county was formed on 1 April 1965 from the areas of the administrative counties of Cambridgeshire and Isle of Ely (with minor boundary changes) less Thorney Rural District. As well as becoming an administrative county, Cambridgeshire and Isle of Ely also became a county for other statutory purposes. Accordingly, the Lord Lieutenant of Cambridgeshire was retitled Lord Lieutenant of Cambridgeshire and Isle of Ely. A High Sheriff was also appointed to the new county, and a single commission of peace and court of quarter sessions established.

On the creation of the county, an order under the Police Act 1964 came into force creating the Mid-Anglia Constabulary by merging the Cambridge City Police, Cambridgeshire County Constabulary, Isle of Ely Constabulary, Huntingdonshire Constabulary, and the Peterborough Combined Police Force. On further local government reform in 1974, this became the present Cambridgeshire Constabulary with the same boundaries.

The county ranked 33 out of 46 by population.

== Districts ==
The county was divided into twelve districts: two municipal boroughs, four urban districts and six rural districts. The districts, which were transferred from the previous administrative counties, were:

District	Area (acres)	Population 1961	Population 1971
City of Cambridge MB†	10,060	95,527	98,840
Wisbech MB‡	4,617	17,528	17,015
Chatteris UD‡	15,107	5,491	5,578
City of Ely UD‡	14,659	9,803	9,965
March UD‡	19,787	13,144	14,285
Whittlesey UD‡	22,263	9,322	10,458
Chesterton RD†	111,692	44,576	53,660
Ely RD‡	66,082	14,442	15,355
Newmarket RD†	81,101	20,879	23,786
North Witchford RD‡	24,700	4,740	4,352
South Cambridgeshire RD†	112,213	29,402	36,754
Wisbech RD‡	49,841	12,551	12,994
TOTAL			303,042

† Formerly in Cambridgeshire ‡ Formerly in Isle of Ely

== Coat of arms ==
Coat of arms of the Cambridgeshire and Isle of Ely County Council

Arms of Cambridgeshire County Council, granted in 1914.

Arms of Isle of Ely County Council, granted in 1931.

Coats of arms of the former county councils.

The county council was granted armorial bearings by the College of Arms on 1 September 1965. The coat of arms was a combination of those of the two merged county councils. The blazon of the arms was as follows:

Or a double tressure flory counter flory gules, overall on a bend wavy azure three crowns or; the shield ensigned by a mural crown or. Supporters: on either side a great bustard proper, the exterior leg resting on a closed book gules, garnished or. Badge: Within an annulet issuant therefrom four fleurs-de-lys in cross an open crown or.

The gold field and red tressure flory counter flory were taken from the royal arms of Scotland. This was in reference to the fact that the Earldom of Cambridge was held by David I of Scotland in the twelfth century. The blue wave represented the River Cam on which were three crowns from the arms of the Diocese of Ely. The supporters were great bustards, a bird extinct in England, whose last habitat was said to have been in the county. The birds were differenced from those supporting the previous Cambridgeshire arms by the placing of a red book beneath their feet. The book came from the arms of the University of Cambridge. The Latin motto adopted also referred to the university, and was Sapientes Simus or "Let us be men of understanding".

== Abolition ==
The county had only a brief existence: the Local Government Act 1972 reformed all administrative structures in England and Wales outside Greater London. On 1 April 1974, Cambridgeshire and Isle of Ely was merged with Huntingdon and Peterborough to form a new non-metropolitan county of Cambridgeshire, bringing into effect the amalgamation originally proposed in 1947.
