= Arthur Mellows Village College =

Location
- Helpston Road; Glinton; Peterborough, Cambridgeshire, PE6 7JX; England; 52.63693°N 0.30246°W

Information
- Type: Academy
- Local authority: Peterborough
- Department for Education URN: 136266 Tables
- Ofsted: Reports
- Headteacher: John Gilligan
- Gender: Coeducational
- Age: 11 to 18
- Colours: green, white and black
- Website: http://www.arthurmellows.peterborough.sch.uk

Arthur Mellows Village College is a secondary school in Glinton in the local authority of Peterborough. The college is an academy with a specialism in technology.

Olympic gymnast Louis Smith and footballers Luke Steele and Lia Cataldo are amongst the alumni.

== History ==
The school is named after its founder, Arthur Holditch Mellows (1892–1948), a British army captain from the Hunts Cyclist Battalion who was promoted to colonel during World War I, served in Iraq during the 1920s, and commanded local Home Guard units during World War II. In the interwar years he became a solicitor, and from 1935–37 he was Mayor of Peterborough. From 1943 onwards he headed the national education committee. He owned a black Chrysler Windsor, an unusual sight in wartime Britain.

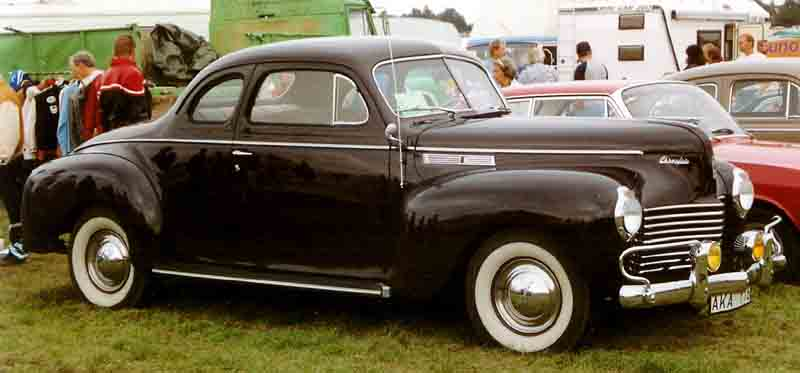
1940s Chrysler, of the type owned by Arthur Mellows

Colonel Mellows was returning from a shoot on 16 October 1948, when his car was struck by a train at Conington, Huntingdonshire.

The college opened in 1949. From 1948 until the 1970s, the Arthur Mellows Memorial Trust hosted lectures at the college and provided education grants in subjects of interest to Mellows.

In the 1970s and 1980s the college was ahead of its time in community links. Arthur Mellows offered evening classes and a meeting area for community groups and had a public library on site. As such the school used to refer to the headteacher using the title "Warden". More recently this was changed to the more recognisable term "Head of College".

The college was originally built to serve the villages from Wittering to Eye which form an approximate straight line, the village of Glinton being in the middle. More recently the school developed a broader catchment including pupils from the large Peterborough suburb of Werrington. In the 2000s multiple Peterborough schools were considered failing, closed down, demolished, rebuilt and re-named. However, Arthur Mellows converted to academy status, underwent significant expansion and was considered a successful school.

== Architecture ==
Built just after WWII, the college was designed so that it could be quickly converted into a hospital if necessary. However, this was never required. It is most evident on the main ground floor teaching corridor of the original building, where large glass windows make easy viewing from corridor to classrooms which could be re-purposed as wards. The external walls of these classrooms are almost entirely glass, which would have allowed patients access to large amounts of light and south facing patios.

== School performance and inspections ==
As of 2024, the college's most recent inspection by Ofsted was in 2014, with a judgement of Outstanding.

In 2008, results at GCSE and A-Level were above average.
