= Bretton, Peterborough =

Civil parish in Cambridgeshire, England

Coordinates: 52.5997°N 0.2807°W

Bretton
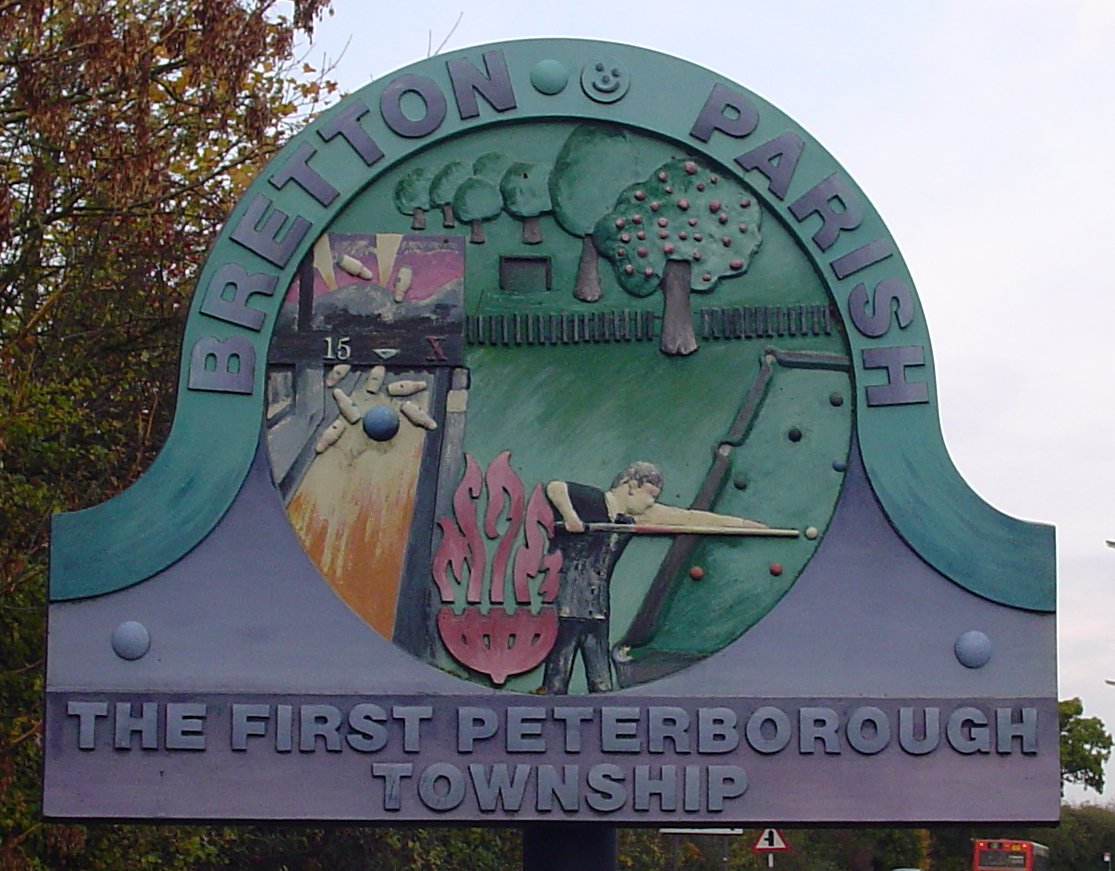

- Location within Cambridgeshire
- Population: 12,689
- OS grid reference: TF1601
- Unitary authority: Peterborough
- Ceremonial county: Cambridgeshire
- Region: East
- Country: England
- Sovereign state: United Kingdom
- Post town: Peterborough
- Postcode district: PE3
- Dialling code: 01733
- Police: Cambridgeshire
- Fire: Cambridgeshire
- Ambulance: East of England

Bretton is a settlement and civil parish on the north western edge of Peterborough, in the Peterborough district, in the ceremonial county of Cambridgeshire, England. Bretton has been designed as a green environment; the major roads (Bretton Gate and Way) are tree-lined and there are several large parks and playing fields. It consists of two main areas; North Bretton and South Bretton, these are divided by Bretton Centre. North Bretton has the larger population and is home to the industrial estates and most leisure facilities as well as the Crematorium. The main entrance to Milton Hall is from Bretton Way in South Bretton and Nene Park is accessed via an under pass beneath the A47.

Bretton Centre's main building is The Cresset multi-purpose venue, holding a large stage and seating, shops, a church, children's entertainment and places to eat. Bretton centre was heavily redeveloped in the early to mid 2000s..

== History ==
There is evidence found by archaeologists of Iron Age and Roman dwellings to the south of Grimeshaw wood on Bretton way, near Bretton centre. It is one of several ancient woods within the township that has survived development in recent decades. In 1967 Peterborough was designated a New Town and Bretton was created as the city's first township; shortly followed by Orton. Bretton's construction began in 1970, on land formerly part of the Milton estate. The deer park is within a short walk of South Bretton, as is Milton Hall (the largest private residence in Cambridgeshire) and dates back to the 16th century. There are several buildings on the estate from the 17th and 18th centuries. Milton estate falls within the parish boundaries of Bretton, Castor and Marholm. Bretton is surrounded by countryside to its north and west boundaries, the ancient village of Longthorpe, and the A47 (Soke parkway) to the south and the East Coast Main Line to the east.

== Governance ==
Bretton Parish council was established in 1984 and has an office in the Pyramid centre, North Bretton.

Bretton is represented on Peterborough City Council by three councillors for the North Bretton ward and one for the South Bretton ward. Bretton is part of the constituency of Peterborough.

== Demography ==
At the time of the 2001 census, Bretton parish had a population of 12,689 people – 6,160 males and 6,529 females living in 5,191 households.

== Education ==
Bretton has a number of primary schools; at secondary level, Bretton Woods Community School was closed in 2007 and replaced by The Voyager School (now Queen Katharine Academy) in Walton. Walton Comprehensive School was also closed at this time. The IQRA academy, an independent secondary school for Muslim girls is established in North Bretton.

The primary schools include Sacred Heart Roman Catholic (Voluntary Aided) Primary School, Middleton County Primary School, Eyrescroft County Primary School and Lime Academy Watergall.

== Industry and commerce ==
Budget Insurance (previous owner of Compare the Market), one of Peterborough's biggest employers, was based in Bretton. The Thomas Cook Group head office was in North Bretton but relocated to a new building across the city. The former site has been redeveloped for logistics and other industry.

The new City Hospital has been built just outside Bretton, and Eagle Wood Neurological Care Centre has been built on the north side of Bretton centre. There is a specialist Orthopaedic and spinal hospital in North Bretton. In South Bretton there is the Fitzwilliam (Bupa) private hospital. Bretton medical Practice, is in Bretton centre.

North Bretton has several industrial estates that are situated between Bretton way and the East coast railway line.

== Culture ==
Bretton is home to The Cresset, a theatre which also contains other leisure facilities, the Fayre Spot pub, library, Pre-school, Holy Spirit CE church, independent shops, a gym and YMCA flats. Bretton is within the Catholic parish of Sacred Heart & St.Oswald.

Bretton carnival is held in the Bretton park each summer.

Bretton also holds one of the biggest fireworks displays in peterborough, held at the peterborough rugby lions club every year in November. There is a Masonic Hall in North Bretton and Baptist church in South Bretton.

There are many cycleways and pathways within Bretton and easy access to the open countryside for lovers of outdoor life.

== Sport ==
Peterborough Ice Arena, home to the Peterborough Phantoms ice hockey team, is in Bretton. Bretton is also home to the Peterborough Lions rugby club based on the fields of Bretton Park. The park has outdoor gym equipment and a small bmx track and skate park. These fields are also the home to the area's local football side Peterborough City FC who play in the Peterborough football league (PDFL). In South Bretton, crown green bowls is played at the pavilion in South Bretton recreation park. There is also two football pitches in regular use.
