= Thorney Rural District =

Former local government area in the UK

Coordinates: 52.587°N 0.109°W

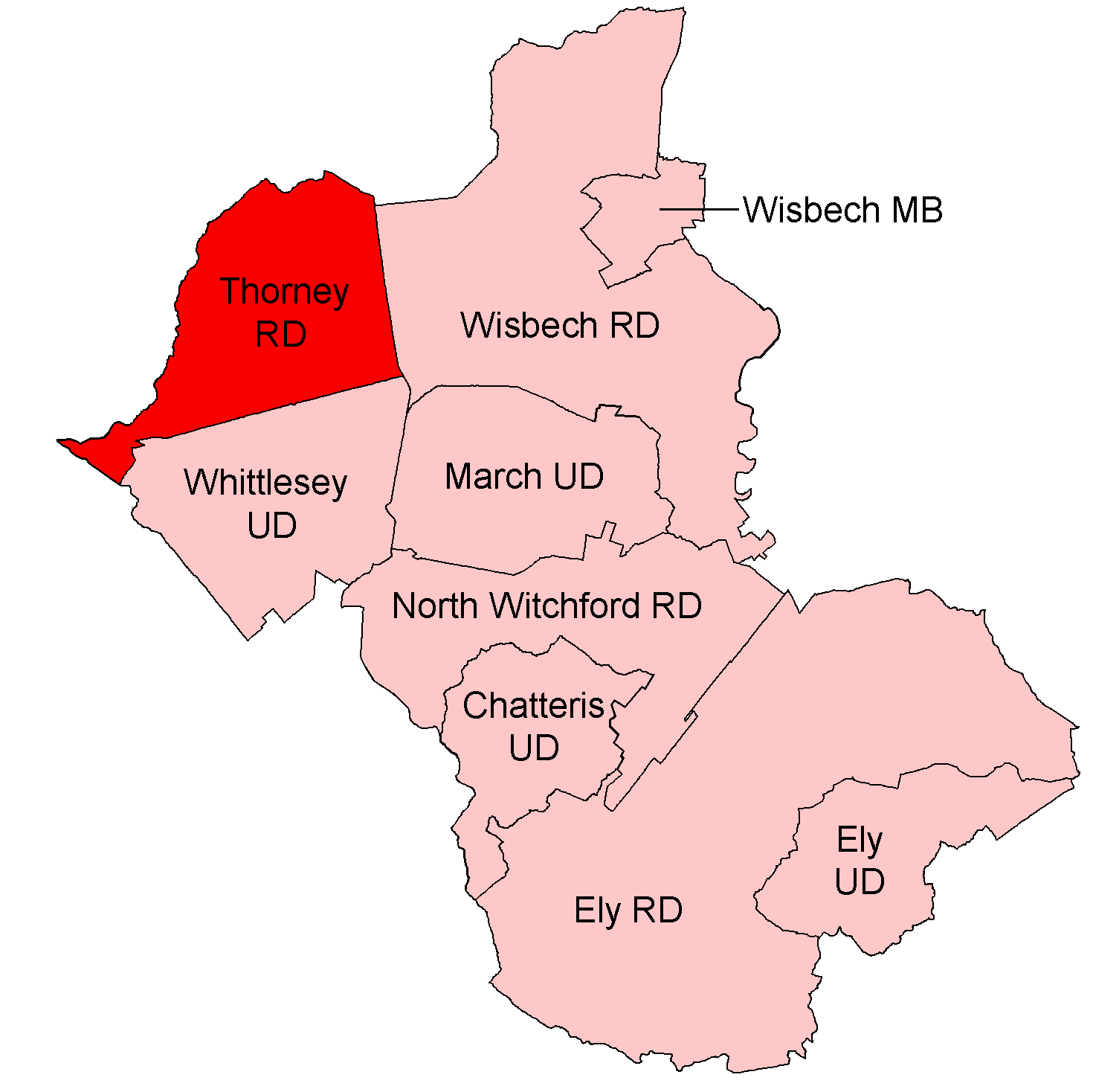
Position within Isle of Ely

Thorney was a rural district in England from 1894 to 1974, situated to the east of Peterborough.

It was created under the Local Government Act 1894, covering the parishes of Thorney and Stanground. It was considered part of the administrative county of the Isle of Ely. In 1904 Stanground was split, with the new parish Stanground North remaining in the district (and Isle of Ely), while the remainder, Stanground South, became part of the Old Fletton Urban District in Huntingdonshire.

In 1965, when Isle of Ely was merged with Cambridgeshire to form Cambridgeshire and Isle of Ely, Thorney RD was instead transferred to the administrative county of Huntingdon and Peterborough.

In 1974, the district was abolished under the Local Government Act 1972, its area going to form part of the Peterborough district, in the new non-metropolitan county of Cambridgeshire.
