= Gunthorpe, Peterborough =

Area of Peterborough, England

Coordinates: 52°36′40″N 0°15′03″W

Gunthorpe
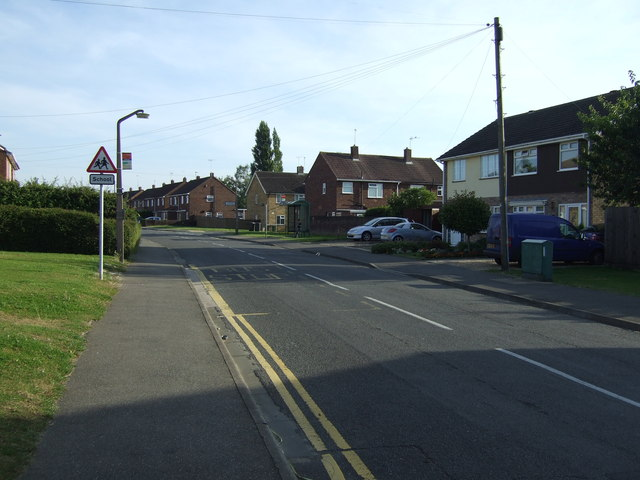
- Hallfields Lane

- Location within Cambridgeshire
- Unitary authority: Peterborough
- Shire county: Cambridgeshire
- Region: East
- Country: England
- Sovereign state: United Kingdom
- Post town: PETERBOROUGH
- Postcode district: PE4
- Dialling code: 01733

Gunthorpe is a residential area of the city of Peterborough, in the ceremonial county of Cambridgeshire, England. Since 2015 Gunthorpe has its own ward within Peterborough City Council that also encompasses parts of South Werrington.

Development in Gunthorpe has been ongoing since the 1950s. The new Roman Fields development is in progress across the A15 and will include parks and a new academy. Development at the Roman Fields has been concurrent since 2006.

There has also been activity in the north of Paston which is now Gunthorpe Ridings, a large development dating back to 1982 to 1988 by Wilcon Homes. Previously Wilcon Homes's area office was located on Meal's Gate.

On the primary road going straight through Gunthorpe, there are two shop units, a pub and school. The school was opened as a primary school in 1975, and the two shop units and pub all opened with the Wilcon Homes development, although the shop units have switched firms multiple times.

== Schools ==
Most primary school students attend Gunthorpe Primary School and Norwood Primary School. Secondary school pupils attend Queen Katherine Academy, which is located on the former site of Walton Comprehensive School. Other students attend Ken Stimpsons Community School in new Werrington, and the upcoming Manor Drive Academy which will open in 2022 as part of the Roman Fields development.

== Civil parish ==
Gunthorpe became a parish in 1866; on 1 April 1929 it was abolished and merged with Peterborough. In 1921 the parish had a population of 65.
