= Sutton, Peterborough =

Village in Cambridgeshire, England

Coordinates: 52.575°N 0.382°W

Sutton
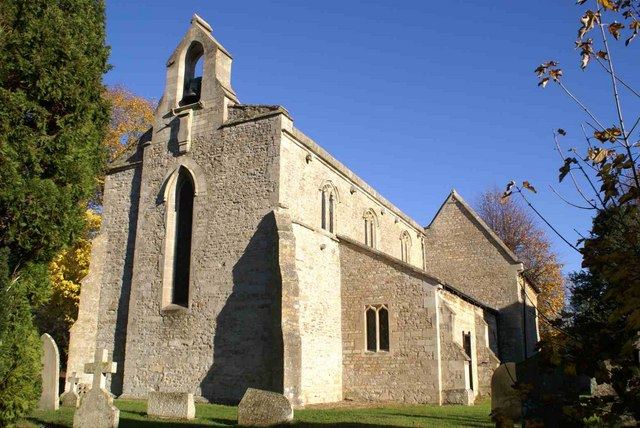

- Location within Cambridgeshire
- Population: 196 (2011)
- Civil parish: Sutton
- Unitary authority: Peterborough
- Ceremonial county: Cambridgeshire
- Region: East
- Country: England
- Sovereign state: United Kingdom
- Post town: Peterborough
- Postcode district: PE5
- Dialling code: 01780
- Police: Cambridgeshire
- Fire: Cambridgeshire
- Ambulance: East of England

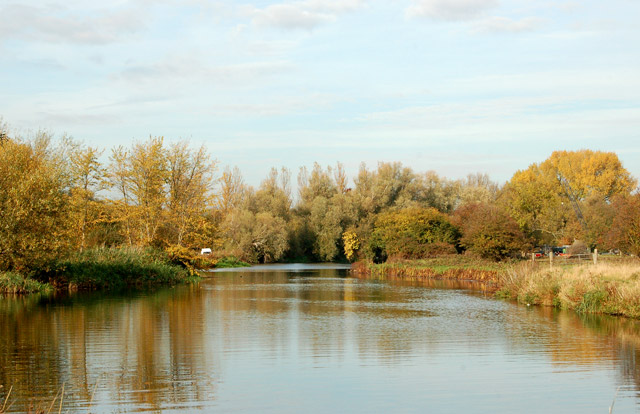
Autumn colours on the River Nene near Sutton – geograph.org.uk – 1563755

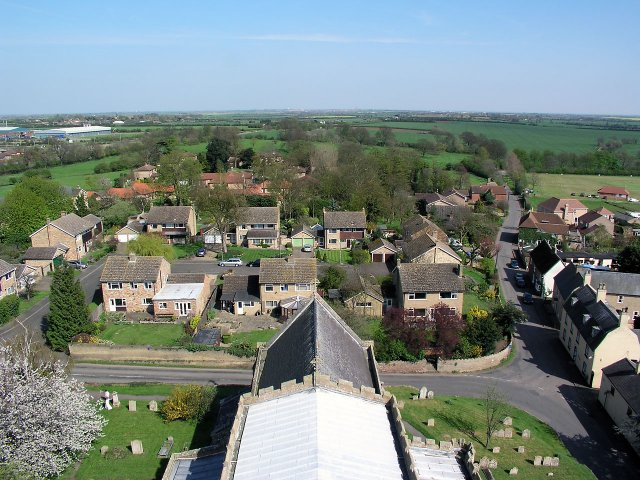
Looking E from Sutton tower – geograph.org.uk – 4320 [Photo is not from St Michael’s and All the Angels, it’s a church from a different Sutton]

Sutton is a small village and civil parish in the Peterborough district, in the north-west of Cambridgeshire, England. Situated about 5.7 miles from Peterborough and approximately half a mile south of the A47 road.

For electoral purposes it forms part of Glinton and Wittering ward in North West Cambridgeshire constituency.

According to Office for National Statistics Sutton has a population (including Upton) of 196 with a population density of 0.2.

== History ==
20th Century Map of the surrounding area of Sutton

Dating back to 972–992, the area of Peterborough was described as a "woody swamp" but was cleared to a certain degree when Abbot Adulf built manor houses and granges. In 'Old English', Sutton translates as a Southern farm/settlement. The ancient church of Sutton dates back to the 12th century and was originally built as a chapel-of-ease to the church of St Kyneburgha in Castor. It is also home to a war memorial. The church, now named St Michael & All Angels, was originally dedicated to Saint Giles, the patron saint of cripples, lepers and nursing mothers. The majority of the church was rebuilt in 1867–8, but the arch supports have survived from the original construction in the 12th/13th century. A grant of £37,300 was given to complete work on the church by a company called WREN in order for it to become a community hub for locals. Since the grant in 2010, the church has been improved further with such things as heating systems and carpeting.

The historical layout of the village is a simple rectangle of streets engulfing a green where cattle would be, known as a Saxon nucleated settlement (or a Nucleated village), with the grange and chapel located in one corner of the rectangle. With the village being near the River Nene, there was once a ford going over to Stibbington, but this was eventually destroyed by dredging after a long period of not being used. The Manor Farm (also known as 'The Grange') was built in the 17th century. Keith Garrett described the manor as a "fully constituted manor with its manor house or hall, its home farm, open fields, and lands of villeins, who held their dwellings and small agricultural holdings for customary services in cultivating the Abbey's home farm etc."

In 1870–72, this is how John Marius Wilson's Imperial Gazetteer of England and Wales described Sutton:

SUTTON, a chapelry in Castor parish, Northampton; on the river Nen, near Wansford r. station. Acres, 880. Real property, £1,101. Pop., 112. Houses, 22. The living is a p. curacy in the diocese of Peterborough. Value, not reported. Patron, the Bishop of P. The church is ancient. Charities, £10.

== Population ==
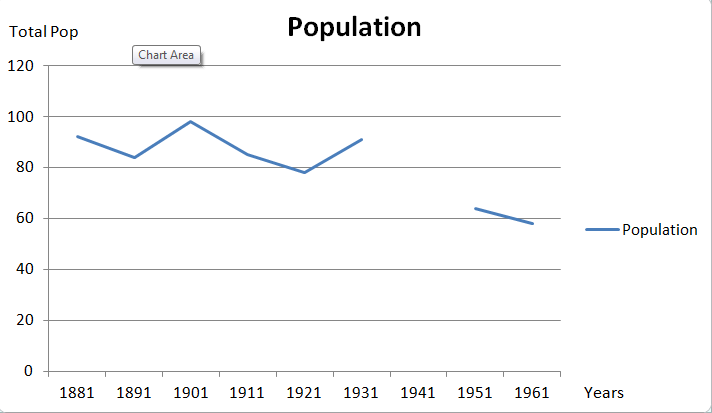
Total change in population of Sutton from years 1881–1961 according to Census data

As mentioned previously, the total population of Sutton is at 196 according to the Office for National Statistics for 2011 Census. Between the years of 1881 and 1961 the overall trend shows that population declined, however with some anomalies. The recorded population fluctuated from 1881– In 1881 the total population of Sutton is 92, which then dropped the following ten years to 84. The population peaked in this time period when it rose back up to 98 by 1901, followed by an overall decline of 20 in the 20 years from 1901 to 1921. Just 10 years later, the population grew rapidly to 91 in 1931 which was followed by a fall of 27 over the next 20 years. No census information was found for the population in 1941, shown in the graph, but the population declined further to 58 by the year 1961. We can compare the figures over these years with the population census report for Sutton in 2011, which was 196, showing an increase of 138 residents in Sutton over these 50 years.

Sutton is sparsely populated with a population density of 0.2, showing that the parish it is not a heavily residential area. Using Census data we can also see the change in male and female residents of Sutton over time. Since 1881 there have been slightly more females in this area than males. In 1881 52 females were counted in comparison to just 40 males. Ten years later this changed as only 41 females were recorded to a score of 43 males. Up until 1921 the 2 Census reports showed more females than males occupying the parish. The male numbers remained above the female population in the 1931 Census and were equal with 32 residents recorded of both sexes 20 years on in the 1951 census. By 1961 the female population regained dominance as there were 4 more females than males. Of the 196 residents recorded in the 2011 population census there were 103 male inhabitants to that of 93 female.

169 of the 196 residents of Sutton are English-born according to 2011 census data, in comparison to 176 of 190 residents in 2001, showing that there was an increase in foreign-born people populating Sutton over these 10 years. Using Neighbourhood Statistics we can also analyse the population structure over the last 10 years. In the 2001 census 122 of 190 residents were aged between 30 and 74, showing a majority working population. In the 2011 census there were also 122 people living in sutton from the ages of 30–74 with 52 residents aged from 45 to 59 and a mean average age of 47.3.

The average age of the population of Sutton as a whole, is older than the national average and the Cambridgeshire average, suggesting that it has an ageing population.

== Employment ==
Bar Graph showing Sutton's breakdown of industries according to ONS 2011 census

Sutton's Occupational Orders 1881

Two bar graphs that can be seen in this section portray the occupational orders in Sutton 130 years apart. The bar chart to the right shows Sutton's occupational orders in 1881, and what is distinctly noticeable about it is the large number of male residents who were involved in agriculture as an occupation, 28 to be specific. Having such a large proportion of males involved in agriculture could become a problem at this time due to the agricultural depression (Long Depression) which could be a contributor to the fall in population of Sutton in the early 20th century (shown in population graph in the demographics section). It is also evident that 13 females occupations were unknown in the 1881 census. This is due to the fact in the Victorian Era, women's work was most likely based around home and family and was inaccurately recorded. The work they could obtain in the factories or in domestic service wouldn't be consistent.

The most noticeable change between the two graphs is the decrease in number of people working in the agricultural sector due to the shift in industry from primary industries to that of more technologically advanced industries over the 19th and 20th centuries. The graph shows that the 2 highest occupations in the 2011 census were retail trade and education where precisely 13 economically active residents worked.

In 2014, the area of Peterborough has an unemployment rate of 6.9% of the working population where 79.4% are recorded as economically active. This shows that Sutton is within an area of high unemployment in comparison to the national figure of 5.5%. According to the 2011 Census, 94 residents of the total 138 from the working population are seen to be economically active, whereas the remaining 44 are inactive due to a number of situations such as; retired, sick or disabled or looking after family.

== Housing ==
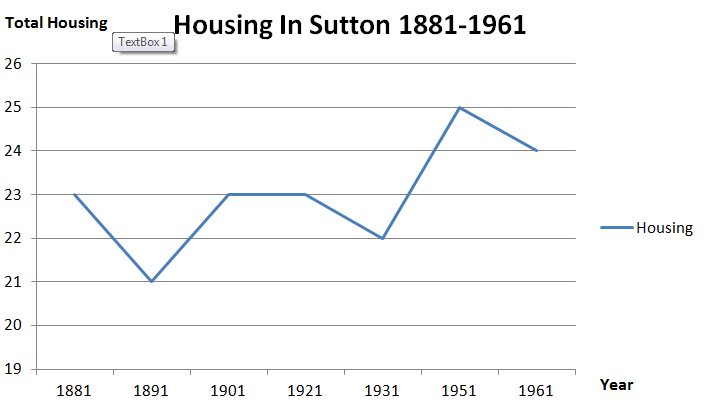
Line chart showing the change in number of houses from 1881 to 1961 according to ordnance survey census data

The Area of Sutton has a higher rate of home ownership than the national and Cambridgeshire average, showing that Sutton is a fairly affluent area. The maximum number of houses from the time period 1881–1961 was just 25, with 23 in 1881 and 24 in 1961. The change in number of houses over this time was fairly stagnant. From the 1961 census to the 2011 census the number of houses in Sutton has increased to 74. 55.4% of these houses were owned outright, again showing the affluence of the area. Sutton has developed and grown through building more houses over this time. Data taken from the 2011 census shows that 51 of the 74 houses are detached and 23 semi-detached with no flats in the village at all.
