= Peakirk =

Village in Cambridgeshire, England

Coordinates: 52.633°N 0.267°W

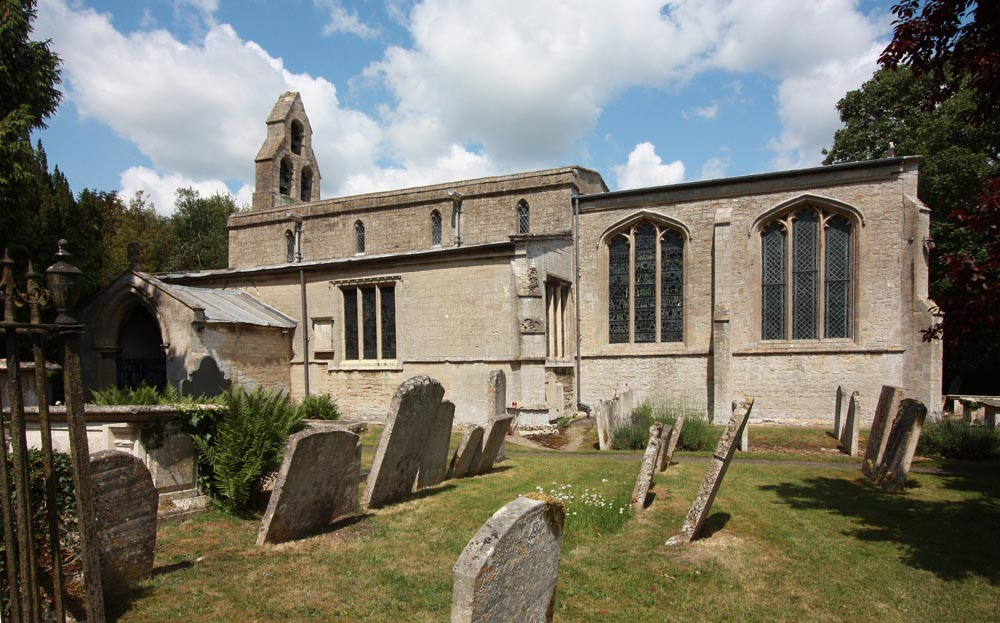
- St Pega's Church

- Location within Cambridgeshire
- Population: 450
- Unitary authority: Peterborough
- Ceremonial county: Cambridgeshire
- Region: East
- Country: England
- Sovereign state: United Kingdom
- Post town: Peterborough
- Postcode district: PE6
- Dialling code: 01733

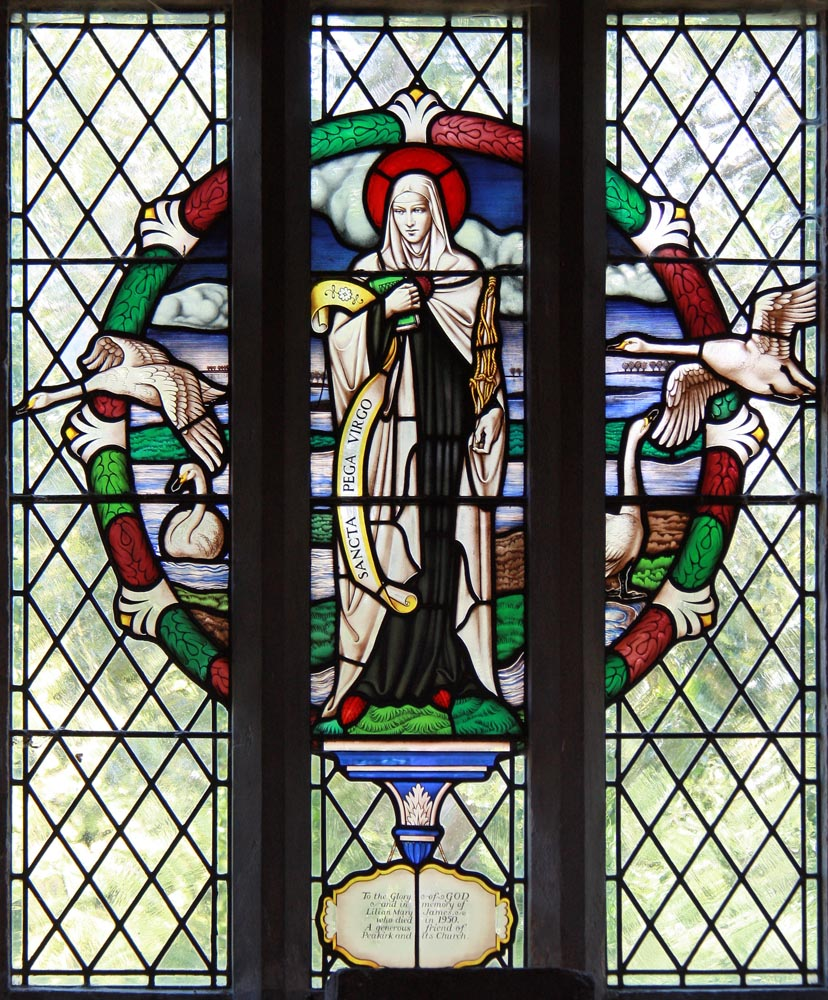
Stained glass window depicting St Pega in the church

Peakirk is a village and civil parish in the Peterborough district, in the ceremonial county of Cambridgeshire, England. For local government purposes it forms part of Glinton and Castor ward; for parliamentary purposes it falls within Peterborough constituency. In 2001, the parish had a population of 321 persons and 139 households.

Pega (died c. 719), the sister of St Guthlac of Crowland, had her cell sited here. The privately owned, Grade-II-listed St Pega's Hermitage is possibly on the site. The parish church is uniquely dedicated to St Pega and the name of the village is derived from "Pega's church". The church is a Grade I listed building and has a fine series of wall paintings. It is said that Pega's heart was kept as a relic in the church, contained in a heart stone, the broken remains of which, smashed by Cromwell's troops, can be seen in the south aisle window.

The Wildfowl & Wetlands Trust, founded by Sir Peter Scott in 1946 to preserve and maintain Britain's many species of waterfowl, had a reserve here until 2001.

Peakirk-cum-Glinton Church of England (Voluntary Aided) Primary School is situated in neighbouring Glinton; most secondary pupils attend Arthur Mellows Village College, also in Glinton.

Peakirk's war memorial is a roll of honour. An oak-panelled frame with 48 photographs and details of the service of all who served from the village during the First World War, not just those who died.

Peakirk Parish Council declared a climate emergency in 2019. As a result, the Peakirk Climate Emergency Group was set up in 2020.

== See also ==
- Peakirk railway station
