= Borough Fen =

Civil parish in Cambridgeshire, England

Coordinates: 52.657°N 0.217°W

- Location within Cambridgeshire
- Population: 126 (2011 census)
- Unitary authority: Peterborough
- Ceremonial county: Cambridgeshire
- Region: East
- Country: England
- Sovereign state: United Kingdom
- Post town: Peterborough
- Postcode district: PE6

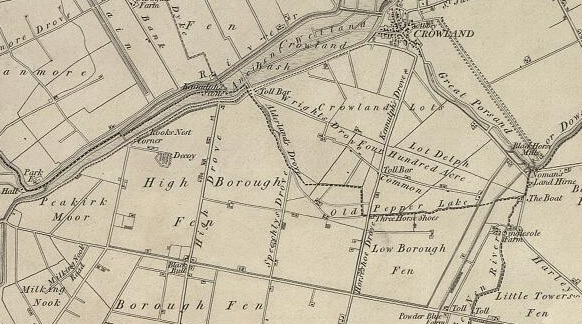
Borough Fen Map 1856

Borough Fen is a civil parish in the City of Peterborough unitary authority in Cambridgeshire, England. The parish is to the north of Peterborough city centre, just below the county border with Lincolnshire. Much of the land in the 19th century was owned by Sir Culling Eardley, 3rd Baronet, a strong supporter of the local boys' school. The land has predominantly been used for agriculture and cattle farming which is still a significant employment sector today.

Described by John Marius Wilson in 1870 as "BOROUGH-FEN (Ville), an extra-parochial tract in Peterborough district, Northampton; 5 miles N by E of Peterborough. Acres, 3,130. Real property, £6,086. Pop., 202. Houses, 31."

== Local area ==
There are 54 dwellings in the Parish of Borough Fen. All but one of the dwellings are whole houses, bungalows, or semi-detached houses. This a similar pattern across the region in nearby Peterborough and the East of England as a whole where the percentage of whole houses is very high. Borough Fen is a very green and open parish with large farmhouses. There are no terraced urban-style roads and no apartment buildings. There is a lack of retail shops in the parish, although they can be found in the neighbouring towns of Crowland and Newborough.

== History ==
=== Population ===
Before 1811 the nearby Parish of Newborough was a tract called Borough Fen Common. Once Newborough became a parish some of the population was returned to Borough Fen explaining the rise in population between 1801 and 1811 shown in the population graph below. Population increased substantially between 1921 and 1931 a key era in the further industrialisation of England. This population rise coincides with the creation of The London Brick Company in Peterborough who by 1935 were producing 60% of the local industry output employing workers in the surrounding areas.

Today the largest age group in Borough Fen is the 45–59 group holding 34.9% of the population in 2011. This coincides with the fact that the majority of households do not have children suggesting that the main bulk of the local population are nearing retirement with no offspring or offspring who have left home. This is comparable to the statistics in the surrounding area of Peterborough.

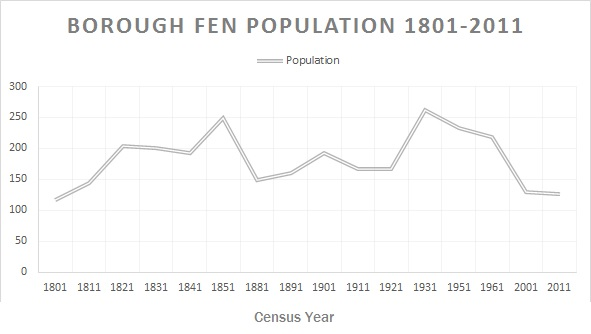
Borough Fen Population

=== Industry and employment ===
Local industry and the work force of Borough Fen has changed over time. In 1881 the majority of employed residents in Borough Fen (87.5%) were employed in the agricultural sector. This was normal for rural areas of England in the late 19th century, in comparison Peterborough's largest employment sector was also agriculture.

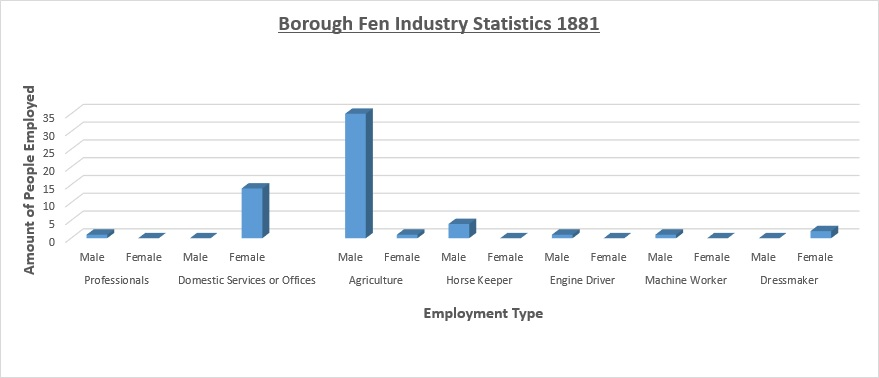
A table showing the employment data for Borough Fen in 1881.

Due to the industrialisation of agriculture, today fewer Borough Fen residents are employed in the agricultural sector. At the 2011 census the number only stood at 16.2% of all employed residents. This shift can be explained by the rise of the retail and mechanical sectors, which now hold 21.2% of local employment, the highest of any sector.

=== Energy Farm Plan ===
In March 2013 a plan was put forward for a collection of wind and solar farms in Newborough Farm (part of Borough Fen), along with nearby America Farm and Morris Fen. They were expected to cost around £200 million covering 900 acres of Peterborough farmland, the council claimed they would bring in £100 million over 25 years. However, in 2014 due to a change in government energy tariffs and a lack of support for the plan led to the project being scrapped.

=== Historic sites ===
Borough Fen has two notable historic features. The older of the two features is the duck decoy located on the west side of the parish, supposedly one of the oldest in England. The decoy was in operation intermittently between 1776 and 1959, catching primarily mallard, and can be seen via tours from the local farm. There is also World War II pillbox fortification, built in 1940 as a component of the British anti-invasion preparations.

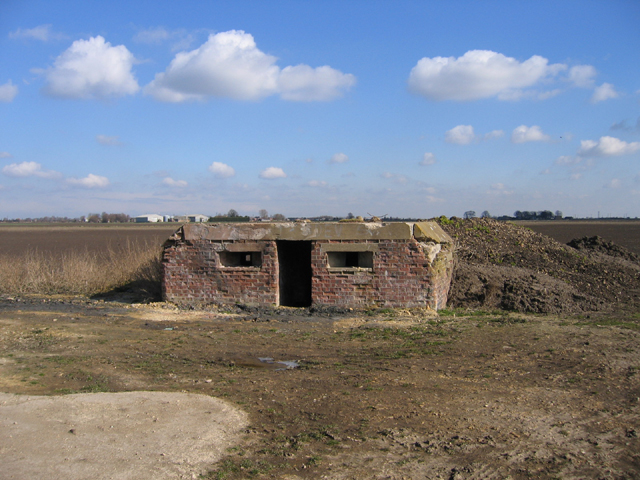
Borough Fen Pill Box
