= City of Peterborough =

City and district of Cambridgeshire, England

- City and unitary authority
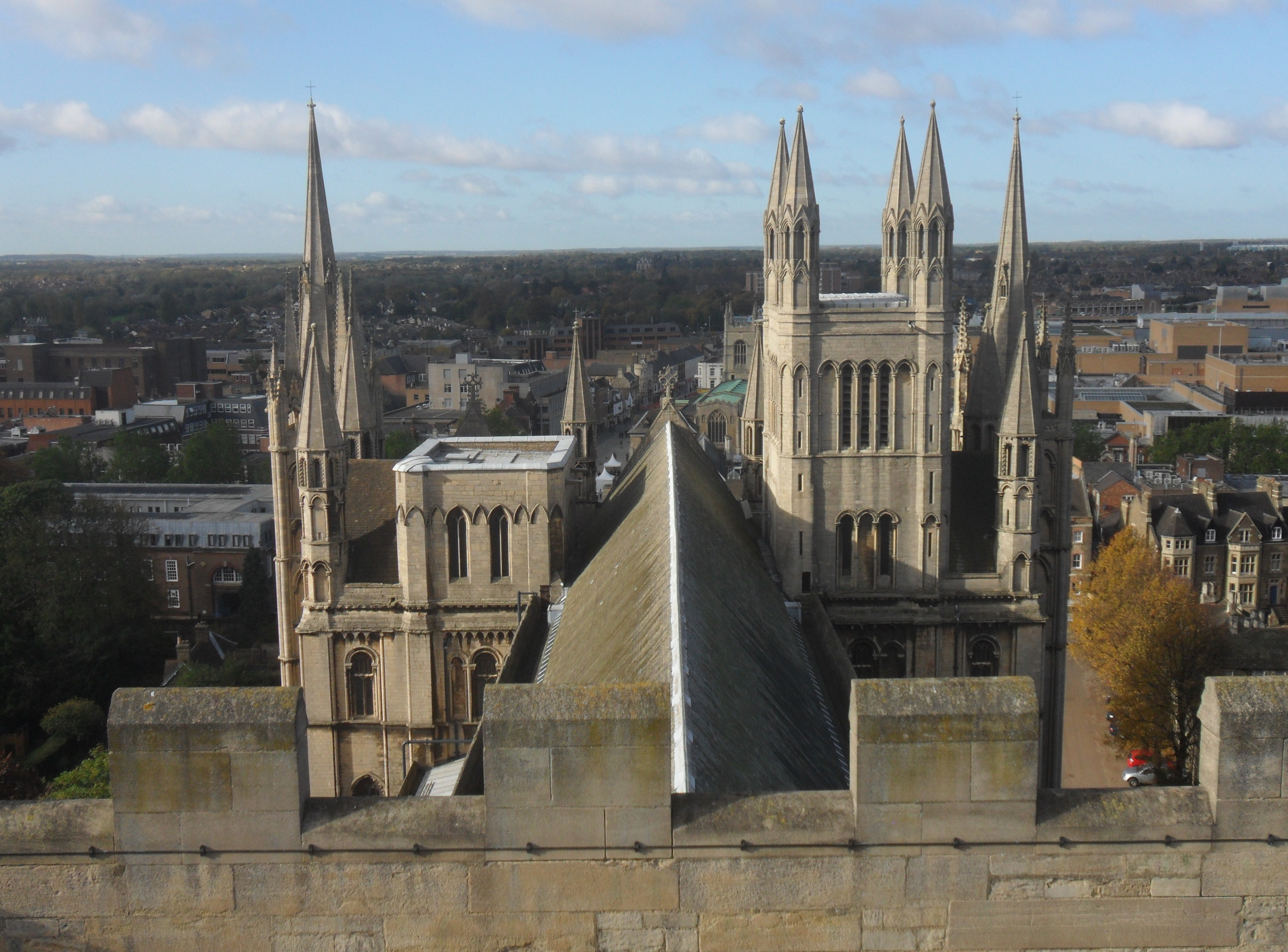
- Peterborough viewed from the top of the cathedral

- City of Peterborough shown within Cambridgeshire
- Coordinates: 52°34′21″N 00°14′35″W
- Sovereign state: United Kingdom
- Country: England
- Region: East of England
- Ceremonial county: Cambridgeshire
- City region: Cambridgeshire and Peterborough
- City status: 1541
- Incorporated: 1 April 1974
- Unitary authority: 1 April 1998
- Named for: Peterborough
- Administrative HQ: Sand Martin House, Fletton

Government
  - Type: Unitary authority
  - Body: Peterborough City Council
  - Executive: Leader and cabinet
  - Control: No overall control
  - Leader: Dennis Jones (L)
  - Mayor: Marco Cereste
  - MPs: Andrew Pakes (L); Sam Carling (L)

Area
  - Total: 132 sq mi (343 km^{2})
  - Rank: 105th

Population (2025)
  - Total: 224,757
  - Rank: 86th
  - Density: 1,700/sq mi (655/km^{2})
- Demonym: Peterborian

Ethnicity (2021)
  - Ethnic groups: List: 75.4% White; 14.3% Asian; 4.1% Black; 3.5% Mixed; 2.7% other

Religion (2021)
  - Religion: List: 46.3% Christianity; 32.5% no religion; 12.2% Islam; 1.8% Hinduism; 0.6% Sikhism; 0.3% Buddhism; 0.1% Judaism; 0.5% other; 5.8% not stated
- Time zone: UTC+0 (GMT)
  - Summer (DST): UTC+1 (BST)
- Postcode areas: PE
- Dialling codes: 01733
- ISO 3166 code: GB-PTE
- GSS code: E06000031
- Website: peterborough.gov.uk

The City of Peterborough is a district and city in the ceremonial county of Cambridgeshire, England. The district is named after its largest settlement, Peterborough, but also covers a wider area of outlying villages and hamlets. The district is administered by Peterborough City Council, a unitary authority.

The district's area covers parts of the historic counties of Northamptonshire and Huntingdonshire, as well as a small part of Cambridgeshire. In 1965, the area became part of the short-lived county of Huntingdon and Peterborough before becoming a district of Cambridgeshire in 1974. Located in the East Anglia region of England, the area borders the surrounding counties of Lincolnshire and Northamptonshire. The population of the district was 202,259 making it the second-largest district by population in East Anglia (after East Suffolk).

Most of the contemporary district was formerly part of the Soke of Peterborough, a liberty within the historic county of Northamptonshire. Between 1889 and 1965, Peterborough was governed by the Soke of Peterborough County Council, making the Soke of Peterborough a completely autonomous, self-governing part of Northamptonshire, while the rest of that county was governed by Northamptonshire County Council. Today, the City of Peterborough district holds a similar status as part of Cambridgeshire to that which the Soke of Peterborough had as part of Northamptonshire, in that the contemporary district is a Unitary Authority with its own council, and a self-governing part of Cambridgeshire while the rest of that county is governed by Cambridgeshire County Council.

Peterborough was a Saxon settlement during the Anglo-Saxon era. The district also includes outlying villages such as Thorney, Old Fletton, Werrington, Parnwell, Dogsthorpe, Eye Green, Glinton, Northborough, Maxey, Wittering, Wansford and Ailsworth.

The district borders North Northamptonshire, Huntingdonshire, Fenland, South Kesteven and South Holland.

== Administration ==
=== Parliamentary seat ===
The city formed a parliamentary borough returning two members from 1541, with the rest of the Soke being part of Northamptonshire parliamentary county. The Great Reform Act did not affect the borough, although the remaining, rural portion of the Soke was transferred to the northern division of Northamptonshire. In 1885, the borough's representation was reduced to one member, and in 1918, the boundaries were adjusted to include the whole Soke. Recent Members of Parliament for Peterborough have included the Conservative Sir Harmar Nicholls (1950–1974), Labour's Michael Ward (1974–1979), Conservative Brian Mawhinney (1979–1997), Labour's Helen Clark (1997–2005) and Conservative Stewart Jackson (2005–2017). Fiona Onasanya won in the 2017 general election for Labour; Onasanya was then expelled from the Labour party in December 2018, but kept her seat as an independent until being ejected on 1 May 2019 after a recall petition, triggering a by-election, which won by Labour's Lisa Forbes (June - November 2019). Conservative Paul Bristow won the seat in the 2019 general election and served as MP for one term, being defeated by Labour's Andrew Pakes in 2024.

In 1997, the North West Cambridgeshire constituency was formed, incorporating parts of the city and neighbouring Huntingdonshire. The inaugural member was Sir Brian Mawhinney, former Secretary of State for Transport and Chairman of the Conservative Party. Mawhinney, who had previously served as Member of Parliament for Peterborough from 1979, did not stand for re-election in 2005 and was created Baron Mawhinney of Peterborough in the county of Cambridgeshire later that year. He was succeeded by fellow Conservative Shailesh Vara; Vara remained MP until 2024 when he was defeated by Sam Carling of the Labour Party; Carling, aged 22, became the youngest member of the House of Commons.

=== Local government ===
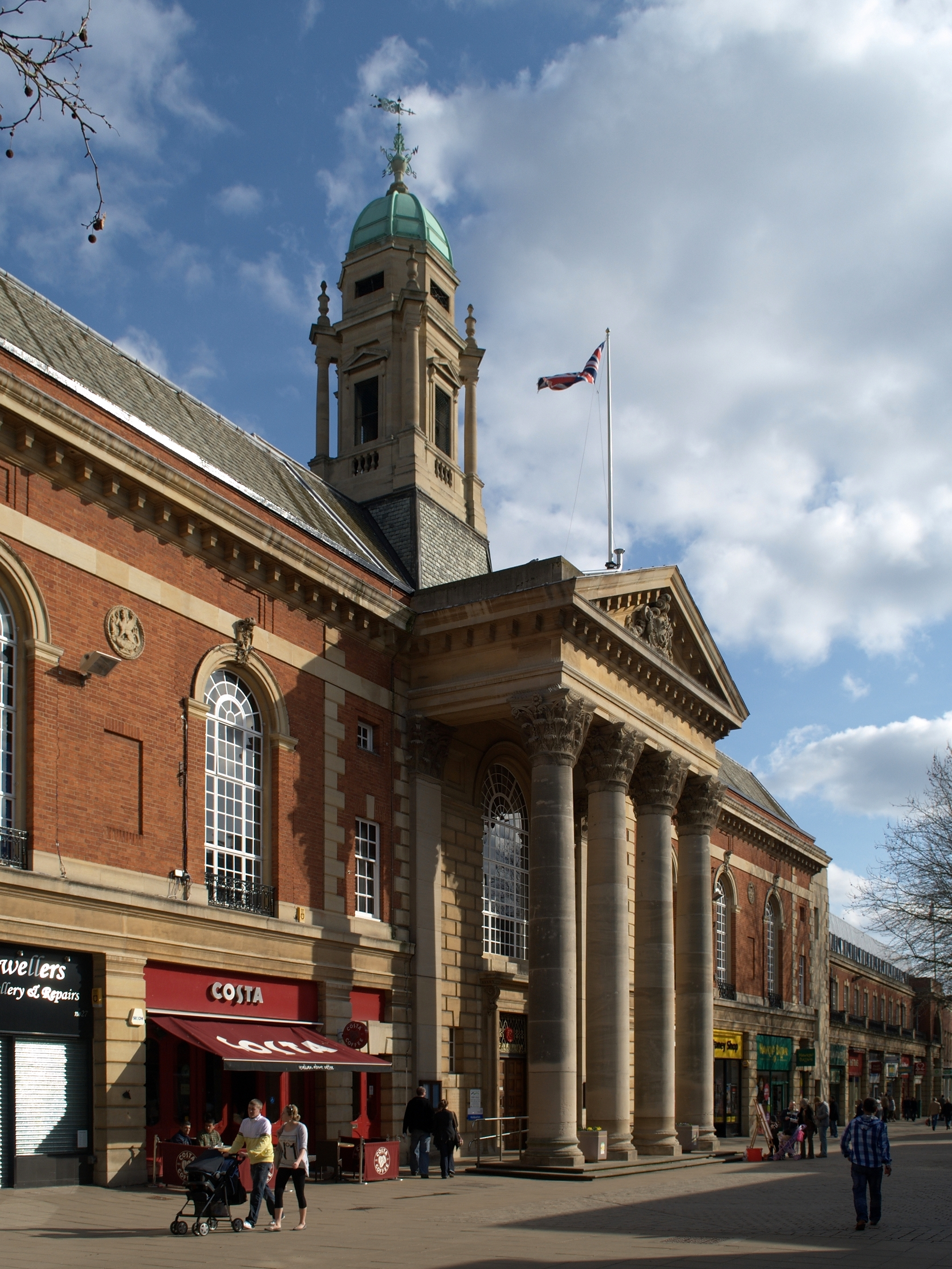
The Town Hall, Peterborough (1930–1933)

From 1889, the ancient Soke of Peterborough formed an administrative county in its own right with boundaries similar, although not identical, to the current unitary authority. The area however remained geographically part of Northamptonshire until 1965, when the Soke was merged with Huntingdonshire to form the county of Huntingdon and Peterborough. Following a review of local government in 1974, Huntingdon and Peterborough was abolished and the current district created by the merger of the Municipal Borough of Peterborough with Peterborough Rural District, Barnack Rural District, Thorney Rural District, Old Fletton Urban District and part of the Norman Cross Rural District, which had each existed since 1894. This became part of the non-metropolitan county of Cambridgeshire. Letters patent were granted continuing the status of city over the greater area. In 1998, the city became autonomous of Cambridgeshire county council as a unitary authority, but it continues to form part of that county for ceremonial purposes. The leader and cabinet model of decision-making, first adopted by the city council in 2001, is similar to national government.

Policing in the city remains the responsibility of Cambridgeshire Constabulary; and firefighting, the responsibility of Cambridgeshire Fire and Rescue Service. The Peterborough Volunteer Fire Brigade, founded in 1884, is unique in the United Kingdom in that it functions as a retained fire station, under the control of the county fire and rescue service, but with unpaid firefighters. The Royal Anglian Regiment serves as the county regiment for Cambridgeshire. Peterborough formed its first territorial army unit, the 6th Northamptonshire Rifle Volunteer Corps, in 1860.

=== Health service ===
Following the Health and Social Care Act 2012, Cambridgeshire and Peterborough Clinical Commissioning Group became the main commissioner of health services in the city. Adult social care functions of NHS Peterborough transferred back to the city council in 2012 and public health transferred in 2013. The responsibility of guided primary care services (general practitioners, dentists, opticians and pharmacists) transferred to NHS England. In 2017 the responsibility for commissioning Primary Care Services transferred back to the CCG. Cambridgeshire and Peterborough is one of the largest CCGs in the England with over 984,000 registered patients, 91 GP practices and a budget of £1.16bn in 2017–18. Although predominately providing health services in Cambridgeshire and Peterborough the CCG also has practices in both Hertfordshire and Northamptonshire.

Previously, NHS Peterborough (the public-facing name of Peterborough Primary Care Trust) guided primary care services in the city, directly provided adult social care and services in the community such as health visiting and physiotherapy and also funded hospital care and other specialist treatments. Prior to the formation of the PCT, the North West Anglia Healthcare NHS Trust provided health functions within the city and before that, Peterborough Health Authority.

Peterborough and Stamford Hospitals NHS Foundation Trust became one of the first ten English NHS foundation trusts in 2004 and in 2017, merged with Hinchingbrooke Health Care NHS Trust to form North West Anglia NHS Foundation Trust. Although a £300 million health investment plan has seen the transfer of the city's two hospitals into a single site, the Trust has been plagued by financial problems since the move. The full planning application for the redevelopment of the former Edith Cavell Hospital was approved by the council in 2006. Planning permission for the development of an integrated care centre on the site of the former Fenland Wing at Peterborough District Hospital was granted in 2003. The City Care Centre finally opened in 2009 and the first patients were treated at the new Peterborough City Hospital in 2010. The private Fitzwilliam Hospital run by Ramsay Health Care UK is situated in the landscaped grounds of the Milton Estate. Cambridgeshire and Peterborough NHS Foundation Trust, a designated University of Cambridge teaching trust, provides services to those who suffer from mental health problems. Following merger of the Cambridgeshire Ambulance Service in 1994, then the East Anglian Ambulance NHS Trust in 2006, the East of England Ambulance Service NHS Trust is responsible for the provision of statutory emergency medical services (EMS) in Peterborough. The East Anglian Air Ambulance provides helicopter EMS across the region.

=== Public utilities ===
The council's budget for the financial year 2018–19 is £418.7 million. The main source of non-school funding is the formula grant, which is paid by central government to local authorities based on the services they provide. This was reduced by nearly 40% during the course of the 2010-15 parliament. The remainder, to which the police and fire authorities (and parish council where this exists) set a precept, is raised from council tax and business rates. This amounts to £59.5 million in 2015–16. Mains water and sewerage services are provided by Anglian Water, a former nationalised industry and natural monopoly, privatised in 1989 and now regulated by OFWAT.

Following deregulation, the consumer has a choice of energy supplier. Electricity was formerly provided by Eastern Electricity, which was privatised in 1990. In 2002, the supply business was sold to Powergen (now E.ON UK) and the distribution rights to EDF Energy who sold them to UK Power Networks in 2010. Natural gas was (and still is) supplied by British Gas, which was privatised in 1986; distribution (and gas and electricity transmission) is the responsibility of the National Grid, having been demerged as Transco in 1997. These industries are regulated by OFGEM. Peterborough Power Station is a 367 MWe gas-fired plant in Fengate operated by Centrica Energy.

British Telecommunications, privatised in 1984, provides fixed ADSL enabled (8 Mbit/s) telephone lines. Local loop unbundling, giving other internet service providers direct access, is completed at four out of 12 exchanges. The city is cabled by Virgin Media (previously Peterborough Cablevision, Cable & Wireless and NTL). These businesses are regulated by OFCOM. Cambridgeshire County Council and Peterborough City Council are embarking on a superfast broadband project to deliver access to improved connectivity to areas where it is acknowledged that the market is unlikely to deliver.

=== Civil parishes ===
The district contains the unparished areas of Peterborough, Old Fletton and Stanground North and 29 civil parishes:

- Ailsworth
- Bainton
- Barnack
- Borough Fen
- Bretton
- Castor
- Deeping Gate
- Etton
- Eye
- Glinton
- Hampton Hargate and Vale
- Helpston
- Marholm
- Maxey
- Newborough
- Northborough
- Orton Longueville
- Orton Waterville
- Peakirk
- Southorpe
- St Martin's Without
- Sutton
- Thorney
- Thornhaugh
- Ufford
- Upton
- Wansford
- Wittering
- Wothorpe

The following changes to civil parishes have taken place over time:

- 1 April 1974:
  - Huntingdon and Peterborough is abolished and merged into the new county of Cambridgeshire.
  - The area formerly comprising the Soke of Peterborough becomes part of the City of Peterborough, a district within the new county, along with the parishes of Thorney and Stanground North from Cambridgeshire and Isle of Ely, and the parishes of Orton Waterville and Orton Longueville and the areas of Fletton, Stanground South and Woodston from the former area of Huntingdonshire.
  - Peterborough, Fletton, Stanground South and Woodston are abolished and become part of the Peterborough unparished area.
- 1 April 1984:
  - Bretton created out of the Peterborough unparished area and part of Marholm.
- 1998:
  - The City of Peterborough becomes a unitary authority independent of Cambridgeshire.
- 1 April 2004:
  - Stanground North abolished and added to the Peterborough unparished area.
- 1 April 2010:
  - Hampton Hargate and Vale created out of the Peterborough unparished area.

== Demographics ==
=== Ethnicity ===
City of Peterborough's population pyramid

Ethnic Group	Year									
Ethnic Group	1981 estimations		1991		2001		2011		2021	
Ethnic Group	Number	%	Number	%	Number	%	Number	%	Number	%
White: Total	122,726	94.1%	141,803	92.6%	140,003	89.7%	151,544	82.5%	162,581	75.3%
White: British	–	–	–	–	133,751	85.7%	130,232	70.9%	128,353	59.5%
White: Irish	–	–	–	–	1,697		1,257		1,177	0.5%
White: Gypsy or Irish Traveller	–	–	–	–	–	–	560		551	0.3%
White: Roma	–	–	–	–	–	–	–	–	938	0.4%
White: Other	–	–	–	–	4,555		19,495	10.6%	31,562	14.6%
Asian or Asian British: Total	–	–	8,560	5.6%	11,400	7.3%	21,492	11.7%	30,801	14.3%
Asian or Asian British: Indian	–	–	2,662		2,876		4,636		7,169	3.3%
Asian or Asian British: Pakistani	–	–	4,752		6,980		12,078		16,972	7.9%
Asian or Asian British: Bangladeshi	–	–	54		113		229		442	0.2%
Asian or Asian British: Chinese	–	–	358		534		872		990	0.5%
Asian or Asian British: Other Asian	–	–	734		897		3,677		5,228	2.4%
Black or Black British: Total	–	–	2,009	1.3%	1,928	1.2%	4,164	2.2%	8,751	4.1%
Black or Black British: African	–	–	204		551		2,480		6,225	2.9%
Black or Black British: Caribbean	–	–	1,208		1,118		1,174		1,419	0.7%
Black or Black British: Other Black	–	–	597		259		510		1,107	0.5%
Mixed or British Mixed: Total	–	–	–	–	2,289	1.5%	4,948	2.7%	7,617	3.5%
Mixed: White and Black Caribbean	–	–	–	–	950		1,542		1,990	0.9%
Mixed: White and Black African	–	–	–	–	208		827		1,627	0.8%
Mixed: White and Asian	–	–	–	–	687		1,384		2,021	0.9%
Mixed: Other Mixed	–	–	–	–	444		1,195		1,979	0.9%
Other: Total	–	–	794	0.5%	441	0.3%	1,483	0.8%	5,920	2.7%
Other: Arab	–	–	–	–	–	–	428		897	0.4%
Other: Any other ethnic group	–	–	794	0.5%	441	0.3%	1,055		5,023	2.3%
Ethnic minority: Total	7,666	5.9%	11,363	7.4%	16,058	10.3%	32,087	17.5%	53,089	24.7%
Total	130,392	100%	153,166	100%	156,061	100%	183,631	100%	215,670	100%

=== Religion ===
Religion	2001		2011		2021	
Religion	Number	%	Number	%	Number	%
Holds religious beliefs	118,549	75.9	126,155	68.7	133,001	61.7
Christian	106,621	68.3	104,202	56.7	99,802	46.3
Buddhist	254	0.2	463	0.3	617	0.3
Hindu	1,383	0.9	2,320	1.3	3,813	1.8
Jewish	147	0.1	144	0.1	185	0.1
Muslim	8,963	5.7	17,251	9.4	26,239	12.2
Sikh	833	0.5	1,184	0.6	1,348	0.6
Other religion	348	0.2	591	0.3	999	0.5
No religion	24,388	15.6	45,183	24.6	70,066	32.5
Religion not stated	13,124	8.4	12,293	6.7	12,604	5.8
Total population	156,061	100.0	183,631	100.0	215,671	100.0

== Local landmarks ==
The district contains many notable attractions and landmarks including: Peterborough Cathedral, Burghley House, Nene Valley Railway, and Longthorpe Tower.

== 2016 EU referendum ==
On 23 June 2016, Peterborough voted in the 2016 EU Referendum under the provisions of the European Union Referendum Act 2015 where voters were asked to decide on the question "Should the United Kingdom remain a member of the European Union or leave the European Union?" by voting for either "Remain a member of the European Union" or "Leave the European Union". The result produced a large "Leave" majority by 61% of voters on a turnout of 72% across the city with only the wards of Peterborough Central, Barnack and late postal votes in the city council area returning "Remain" votes and all other wards returning "Leave" majority votes. Stewart Jackson, the then MP for the parliamentary constituency of Peterborough, backed "Leave". Shailesh Vara, MP for the neighbouring constituency of North West Cambridgeshire which includes a substantial part of the city, campaigned for a "Remain" vote.

United Kingdom European Union membership referendum, 2016; Peterborough
Choice	Votes	%
Leave the European Union	53,216	60.89%
Remain a member of the European Union	34,176	39.11%
Valid votes	87,392	99.91%
Invalid or blank votes	77	0.09%
Total votes	87,469	100.00%
Registered voters and turnout	120,892	72.35%

Peterborough referendum result (without spoiled ballots):
Leave: 53,216 (60.9%)	Remain: 34,176 (39.1%)
▲
