= Wittering, Cambridgeshire =

Village in Cambridgeshire, England

Coordinates: 52.611°N 0.446°W

Wittering
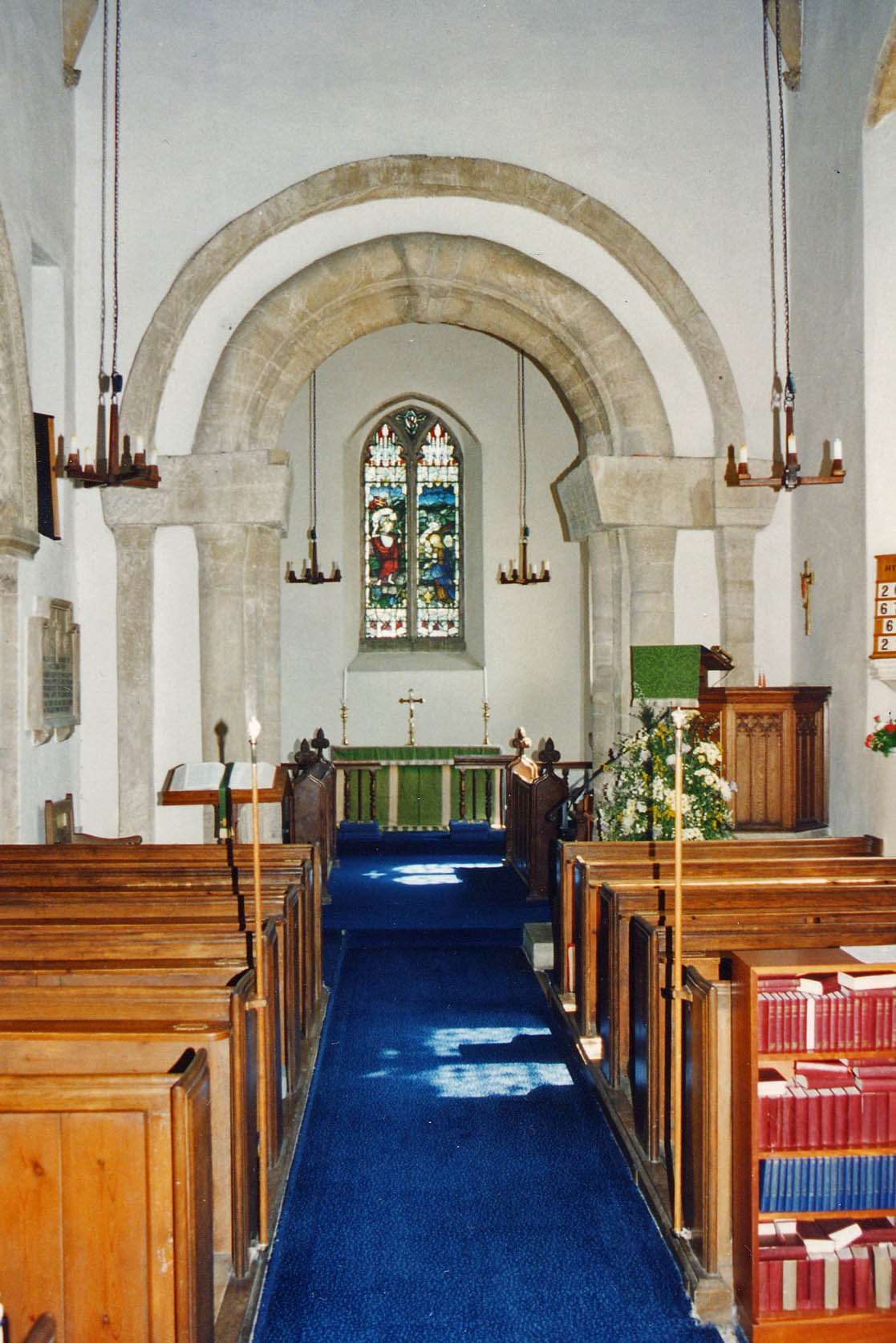
- All Saints' Church interior

- Location within Cambridgeshire
- Population: 2,675
- OS grid reference: TF053026
- Civil parish: Wittering
- Unitary authority: Peterborough
- Ceremonial county: Cambridgeshire
- Region: East
- Country: England
- Sovereign state: United Kingdom
- Post town: Peterborough
- Postcode district: PE8
- Dialling code: 01780
- Police: Cambridgeshire
- Fire: Cambridgeshire
- Ambulance: East of England
- UK Parliament: North West Cambridgeshire
- Website: Wittering Parish Council

Wittering is a village and civil parish in the City of Peterborough unitary authority area in the ceremonial county of Cambridgeshire, England. The village is about 3 miles (5 km) south of the market town of Stamford in neighbouring Lincolnshire and about 9 miles (14 km) west of Peterborough's urban sprawl.

== History ==
The village of Wittering was first attested in 972 AD as Wiðering ige, the settlement of the people of Wiðer. The "people of Wiðer" are believed to be the same as the "Widerigga", named in the Tribal Hidage that was compiled between 600 and 900 AD. This territory comprised 600 hides, so may have consisted of most of Peterborough and possibly neighbouring areas of Northamptonshire and Huntingdonshire. By the time of the Domesday Book in 1086 it comprised 44 households and was owned by the Abbey of Peterborough.

The Church of England parish church of All Saints was built between 950 – 981 AD. Surviving Anglo-Saxon parts of the building include the south wall of the nave, the east end of the chancel and the very substantial chancel arch.

As originally built the church would have had no aisles. In the middle of the 12th century a Norman north aisle was added, linked with the nave by a two-bay north arcade. The present south doorway of the nave, and the east and south windows of the chancel are late 13th century Decorated Gothic insertions. The ashlar west tower is late 13th or early 14th century. In the 14th century the north aisle was rebuilt and the north chapel was added. The north chapel has an early 14th-century tomb recess. The tall Perpendicular Gothic windows in the south wall of the nave were inserted later in the Middle Ages.

The south porch was added in the 19th century and the stained glass east window was made by C.E. Kempe in 1903. The vestry was added in 1969. Apart from the tower, the church is roofed with Collyweston stone slates. All Saints' is a Grade I listed building.

The west tower has a ring of six bells. The fourth bell was cast at Leicester in about 1399. The bellfounder Tobias III Norris of Stamford cast the third and fifth bells in 1681. John Taylor & Co of Loughborough cast the treble, second and tenor bells in 1974.

All Saints' parish is now part of a single benefice with the parishes of Barnack with Ufford, Bainton, and Helpston.

== RAF Wittering ==
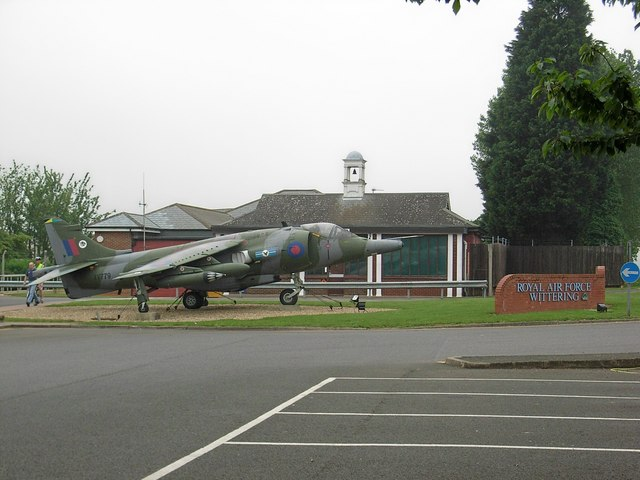
The main gate of RAF Wittering

In 1916 the Royal Flying Corps established a military airfield at Wittering. It became RAF Wittering in 1924 and was an important base for RAF Fighter Command in the Second World War.

In 1954 the airfield was enlarged and became a base for Handley Page Victors, which served as part of the UK's V bomber nuclear strike force until the 1960s and then as aerial refuelling tankers.

After RAF Strike Command was formed in 1968, RAF Wittering became "The Home of the Harrier". Since the UK withdrew its Harrier jump jets in 2010, RAF Wittering has been the base for a number of logistics and support units.

== Climate ==
Climate data for Wittering (1991–2020 normals, extremes 1957–present)
Month	Jan	Feb	Mar	Apr	May	Jun	Jul	Aug	Sep	Oct	Nov	Dec	Year
Record high °C (°F)	15.1 (59.2)	17.8 (64.0)	23.1 (73.6)	26.3 (79.3)	32.6 (90.7)	33.3 (91.9)	39.9 (103.8)	35.2 (95.4)	31.0 (87.8)	28.2 (82.8)	17.5 (63.5)	15.5 (59.9)	39.9 (103.8)
Mean daily maximum °C (°F)	7.1 (44.8)	7.9 (46.2)	10.4 (50.7)	13.4 (56.1)	16.5 (61.7)	19.5 (67.1)	22.1 (71.8)	21.7 (71.1)	18.7 (65.7)	14.4 (57.9)	10.1 (50.2)	7.4 (45.3)	14.1 (57.4)
Daily mean °C (°F)	4.3 (39.7)	4.6 (40.3)	6.6 (43.9)	9.0 (48.2)	11.9 (53.4)	14.9 (58.8)	17.2 (63.0)	17.0 (62.6)	14.5 (58.1)	10.9 (51.6)	7.1 (44.8)	4.6 (40.3)	10.2 (50.4)
Mean daily minimum °C (°F)	1.5 (34.7)	1.4 (34.5)	2.7 (36.9)	4.6 (40.3)	7.4 (45.3)	10.3 (50.5)	12.3 (54.1)	12.3 (54.1)	10.2 (50.4)	7.4 (45.3)	4.0 (39.2)	1.8 (35.2)	6.4 (43.5)
Record low °C (°F)	−13.9 (7.0)	−13.5 (7.7)	−12.0 (10.4)	−5.5 (22.1)	−1.3 (29.7)	0.8 (33.4)	5.2 (41.4)	4.8 (40.6)	1.0 (33.8)	−3.9 (25.0)	−7.6 (18.3)	−10.9 (12.4)	−13.9 (7.0)
Average precipitation mm (inches)	47.0 (1.85)	38.9 (1.53)	39.0 (1.54)	44.2 (1.74)	49.6 (1.95)	52.9 (2.08)	55.5 (2.19)	59.9 (2.36)	52.9 (2.08)	63.3 (2.49)	57.5 (2.26)	53.0 (2.09)	613.6 (24.16)
Average precipitation days (≥ 1.0 mm)	10.1	9.3	8.7	8.8	8.4	9.0	9.1	9.2	8.3	10.2	11.2	10.7	113.1
Mean monthly sunshine hours	63.4	86.2	124.8	167.9	204.9	195.3	207.1	192.9	151.8	113.0	73.7	64.2	1,645.1
Source 1: Met Office
Source 2: Starlings Roost Weather
