= Glinton, Cambridgeshire =

Village in Cambridgeshire, England

Coordinates: 52.639°N 0.295°W

Glinton
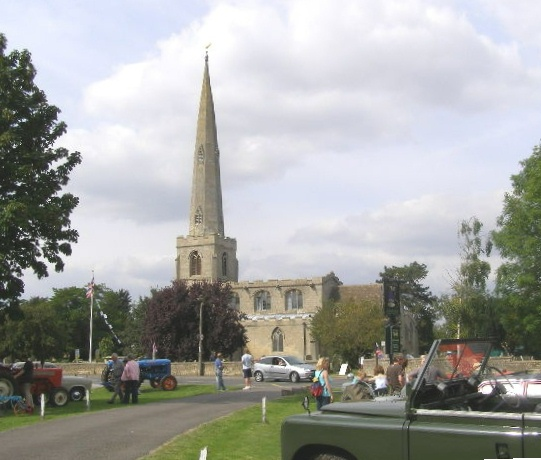
- St Benedict's Church

- Location within Cambridgeshire
- Population: 1,660 (1991 census)
- Unitary authority: Peterborough
- Ceremonial county: Cambridgeshire
- Region: East
- Country: England
- Sovereign state: United Kingdom
- Post town: Peterborough
- Postcode district: PE6

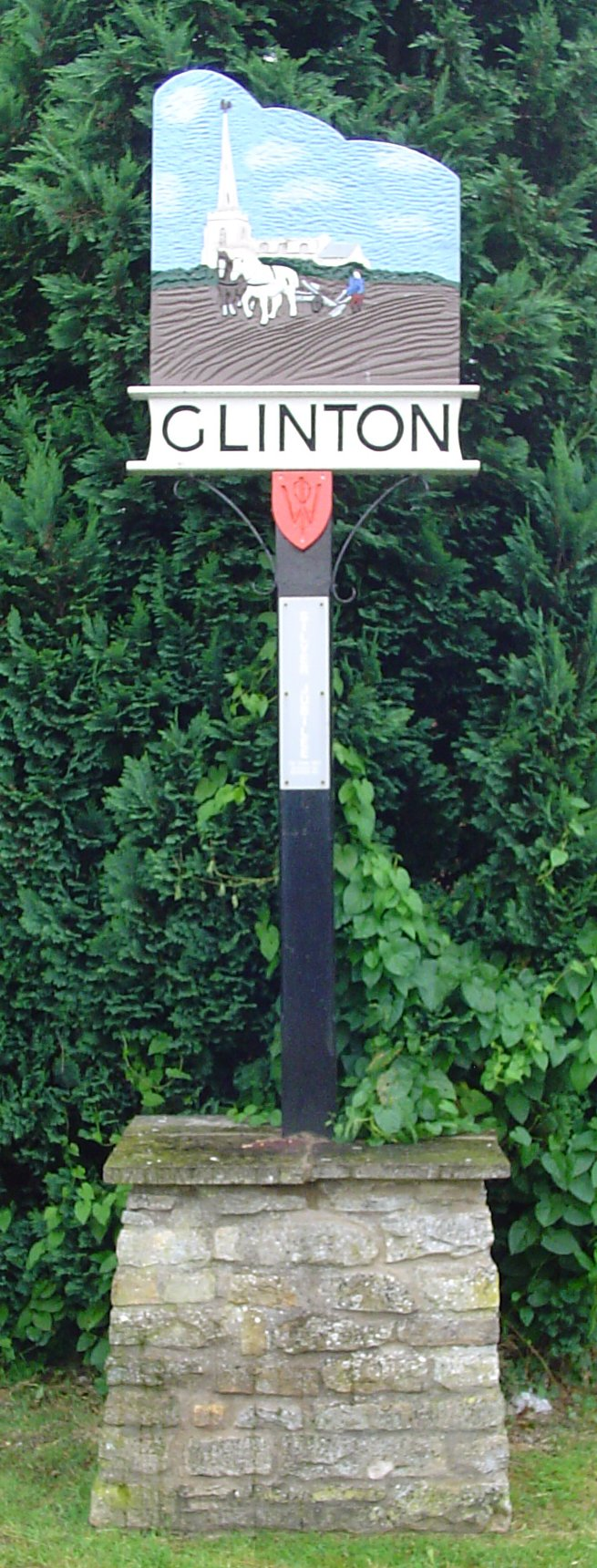
Village sign in Glinton

Glinton is a village in the north of the City of Peterborough unitary authority area in Cambridgeshire, England. Historically in Northamptonshire, it has a population of 3,130 (2001 Census) and consists of about 1,200 dwellings. It is separated from the urban sprawl of Peterborough and the new township of Werrington by the A15, the Peterborough bypass.

== History ==
The origin of the place name Glinton is uncertain. It may mean "village on the Glym brook" (i.e. the Brook Drain) or could possibly be derived from the Old Danish klint (hill), or Middle Low German glinde (enclosure or fence) or the Old English glente, meaning look-out place.

Glinton is mentioned in the Domesday Book of 1086, and evidence suggests that the village dates from prehistory. There is evidence of early settlement at Glinton, dating back to the Iron Age. Extensive Roman remains, including a preserved well, were found during construction of the A15 bypass in 1996, as well as a fine example of a medieval drainage system. Further Roman remains were found in Peakirk Road near the junction with the High Street, and it is thought that the area was the site of a Roman farmstead that supplied the larger settlement of Werrington.

== Main sights ==
The spire of St Benedict's church is considered by many experts to be one of the finest needle spires in England, second only to Salisbury Cathedral. It is the subject of one of John Clare's poems Glinton Spire. Clare, although born in Helpston, went to school in the church, and there is an inscription dated 1808 on the door frame of the church.

== Geography ==
Although covered by Peterborough City Council, Glinton has its own Parish Council consisting of 11 councillors and Clerk.

== Structures ==
Glinton has two small shops: a chemist and also a post office/general store. There is a pub (The Bluebell) in the village, a second pub (The Crown) closed in 2006 and was redeveloped as two residential properties in 2017.

There are two schools in the village, Peakirk cum Glinton (a Church of England primary school with about 200 pupils) and Arthur Mellows Village College (a large secondary school with about 1,700 pupils, named after its founder).
