= List of schools in Peterborough =

Peterborough on a map of England.

The yellow area is the unitary authority of Peterborough within Cambridgeshire

This is a list of schools in Peterborough in the English county of Cambridgeshire.

== State-funded schools ==
=== Primary schools ===
- All Saints' CE Primary School, Dogsthorpe
- Barnack CE Primary School, Barnack
- The Beeches Primary School, Peterborough
- Bishop Creighton Academy, Peterborough
- Braybrook Primary Academy, Orton Goldhay
- Brewster Avenue Infant School, Woodston
- Castor CE Primary School, Castor
- Discovery Primary Academy, Walton
- Dogsthorpe Academy, Dogsthorpe
- Dogsthorpe Infant School, Dogsthorpe
- The Duke of Bedford Primary School, Thorney
- Eye CE Primary School, Eye
- Eyrescroft Primary School, Bretton
- Fulbridge Academy, Peterborough
- Gladstone Primary Academy, Peterborough
- Gunthorpe Primary School, Peterborough
- Hampton College, Hampton Vale
- Hampton Hargate Primary School, Hampton Hargate
- Hampton Lakes Primary School, Peterborough
- Hampton Vale Primary Academy, Hampton Vale
- Heritage Park Primary School, Park Farm
- Highlees Primary School, Westwood
- John Clare Primary School, Helpston
- The King's (The Cathedral) School, Peterborough
- Leighton Primary School, Orton Malborne
- Lime Academy Abbotsmede, Peterborough
- Lime Academy Parnwell, Parnwell
- Lime Academy Watergall, Bretton
- Longthorpe Primary School, Longthorpe
- Manor Drive Primary Academy, Peterborough
- Middleton Primary School, Bretton
- Nene Valley Primary School, Peterborough
- Newark Hill Academy, Peterborough
- Newborough CE Primary School, Newborough
- Northborough Primary School, Northborough
- Norwood Primary School, Peterborough
- Oakdale Primary School, Stanground
- Old Fletton Primary School, Fletton
- Ormiston Meadows Academy, Orton Brimbles
- Orton Wistow Primary School, Orton Wistow
- Paston Ridings Primary School, Paston
- Peakirk-cum-Glinton CE Primary School, Glinton
- Queen's Drive Infant School, Peterborough
- Ravensthorpe Primary School, Peterborough
- Sacred Heart RC Primary School, Bretton
- St Augustine's CE Junior School, Peterborough
- St Botolph's CE Primary School, Orton Longueville
- St John Henry Newman RC Primary School, Peterborough
- St John's Church School, Orton Goldhay
- St Michael CE Primary School, Stanground
- St Thomas More RC Primary School, Peterborough
- Southfields Primary School, Stanground
- Stanground St John's CE Primary School, Stanground
- Thomas Deacon Academy, Peterborough
- Thorpe Primary School, Netherton
- Welbourne Primary Academy, Werrington
- Welland Academy, Peterborough
- Werrington Primary School, Werrington
- West Town Primary Academy, Peterborough
- William Law CE Primary School, Werrington
- Winyates Primary School, Orton Goldhay
- Wittering Primary School, Wittering
- Woodston Primary School, Woodston

=== Secondary schools ===
- Arthur Mellows Village College, Glinton
- City of Peterborough Academy, Peterborough
- Greater Peterborough UTC, Peterborough
- Hampton College, Hampton Vale
- Hampton Gardens, Peterborough
- Jack Hunt School, Netherton
- Ken Stimpson Academy, Werrington
- The King's (The Cathedral) School, Peterborough
- Manor Drive Secondary Academy, Peterborough
- Nene Park Academy, Orton
- Ormiston Bushfield Academy, Orton
- Queen Katharine Academy, Walton
- St John Fisher Catholic High School, Peterborough
- Stanground Academy, Stanground
- Thomas Deacon Academy, Peterborough

=== Special and alternative schools ===
- City of Peterborough Academy Special School, Peterborough
- Heltwate School, North Bretton
- Lime Academy Orton, Orton Goldhay
- Marshfields School, Dogsthorpe
- Medeshamstede Academy, Peterborough
- Nene Gate, Peterborough
- Richard Barnes Academy, Peterborough

=== Further education ===
- Peterborough College, Peterborough

== Independent schools ==
=== Senior and all-through schools ===
- Iqra Academy, Peterborough
- The Peterborough School, Peterborough

=== Special and alternative schools ===
- The Beeches Independent School, Peterborough
- Park House, Thorney
