= Adderley (surname) =

Adderley is an English surname. Notable people with the surname include:

- Bill Adderley (born 1948), British businessman
- Brandon Adderley (born 2002), Bahamian footballer
- Cannonball Adderley (1928–1975), American jazz musician
- Charles Adderley (cricketer) (1912–1985), English cricketer
- Charles Adderley, 1st Baron Norton (1814–1905), British politician
- Georgia Adderley (born 2001), Scottish squash player
- Herb Adderley (1939–2020), American football player
- James Adderley (1861–1942), English cleric and Christian socialist
- Lashell Adderley (born 1968), Bahamian lawyer and politician
- Nasir Adderley (born 1997), American football player
- Nat Adderley (1931–2000), American jazz cornet and trumpet player
- Nat Adderley Jr. (born 1955), American music arranger and pianist
- Nick Adderley (born 1966), British police officer, former Chief Constable of Northamptonshire
- Patrick Adderley (born 1948), Bahamian Anglican priest; Dean of Nassau
- Paul Adderley (1928–2012), Bahamian politician and lawyer
- Robert Adderley (1870–1946), Church of Ireland cleric
- Thomas Adderley (fl.1752), Member of the Parliament of Ireland
- Tommy Adderley (1940–1993), New Zealand singer
- William Adderley (MP), (fl. 1369–1403) English politician
