= Peterborough County Grammar School for Girls =

Location
- Cobden Avenue; Peterborough, Northamptonshire/Cambridgeshire, PE1 2NY; England; 52°34′53″N 0°14′49″W

Information
- Type: Grammar school
- Motto: Non sibi sed deo et alteri Not for ourselves, but for God and others
- Established: 1904
- Closed: 1982
- Local authority: Soke of Peterborough County Council/Huntingdon and Peterborough County Council/Cambridgeshire
- Chair: Jack Hunt
- Head teacher: Rosamund Roberts
- Gender: Girls
- Age: 11 to 18
- Enrolment: c.700
- Houses: Gordon, Kitchener, Marlborough, Nelson, Sidney, Wellington; From 1956 – Burghley, Deene, Kirby, Milton
- Publication: Chronicle
- Website: http://peterborocountyschool.wordpress.com//

The Peterborough County Grammar School for Girls was an all-female grammar school in Peterborough, Cambridgeshire, England.

== History ==
=== Peterborough County School for Girls ===
The school which was to become Peterborough County Grammar School for Girls opened on 17 September 1904 as a pupil teachers training centre in four rooms of the County Technical School in Broadway, with Miss Wragge as Headmistress.

In 1907, the school became Peterborough Girls Secondary School and moved to Park Road.

In 1911 the school changed its name to Peterborough County School for Girls and a new school building, designed by Annesley Brownrigg, was built on the corner of Lincoln Road (then the A15) and Cobden Avenue, near the junction with Burghley Road.

=== PCGS ===
In 1944 the school became Peterborough County Grammar School, administered by the Peterborough Joint Education Board, later the Peterborough City Education Committee.

One solitary male joined the five hundred girls at the school and its thirty female teachers as a science teacher in September 1953, as no female science teacher could be found.

The headmistress, Mona Matthews, aged 53 in December 1962, banned black underwear. In January 1963, the same headmistress decreed that boys being invited to the school dance could only come from two approved local grammar schools, one being Deacon's School, and the name of each boy had to be submitted to her first.; on Tuesday 22 January 1963, this made the front page of the Daily Herald, with a picture of the headmistress.

The Chairman of the Governors, Jack Hunt, would have a school named after him. The New Hall was built in 1955, and new science labs were built in 1956. National hockey matches were played on the sports pitch.

The plan in 1970 was to merge with the John Mansfield School. In 1968 the local council had wanted to go comprehensive by 1974, but opinions were split. In 1976, the school changed its name again to Peterborough County Girls School when it became a comprehensive school.

=== Closure ===
The school was closed in 1982, and school pupils and some members of staff moved to the Ken Stimpson Community School in Werrington.

The school buildings were demolished, apart from the caretakers house, and in 1985 the sheltered housing complex Lincoln Gate was built on the site.

== Alumni ==
- Carolyn Aldworth (formerly Hill), former head of department, Central College Nottingham, freelance medical textbook author
- Judith Bunting, Lib Dem MEP since 2019 for South East England
- Sylvia Cundell (formerly Gardner), retired Senior Crown Prosecutor, East of England, Crown Prosecution Service.
- Dr Clare Gerada, chair of the Council of the Royal College of General Practitioners
- Prof Daphne Jackson , UK's first woman physics professor, and after whom the Daphne Jackson Trust is named, she was youngest fellow of Institute of Physics in December 1966
- Marjorie Pollard, an English field hockey player, and writer; the first woman to commentate on sport for the BBC.
- Phyllis Stedman, Baroness Stedman, of Longthorpe in the City of Peterborough
