= Iqra (disambiguation) =

Iqra may refer to the 96th chapter of the Qur'an. It is also used as a name for people or educational institutions such as

== Education ==
- Iqra Academy, a girls-only independent secondary school in Peterborough, England
- Iqra Institute for Higher Education, a Somali institute for higher education in Badhan, Somalia
- Iqra National University, a university in Peshawar, Pakistan
- Iqra University, a university in Karachi, Pakistan
- Iqra Schools and Colleges Sadiqbad, an education institute located in Sadiqabad, Pakistan

== Other ==
- Iqra (name)

== See also ==
- Rockford Iqra School
