= Orton Community Sixth Form =

Coordinates: 52.5525°N 0.2848°W

Orton Community Sixth Form is a consortium sixth form for Bushfield Community College and Orton Longueville School.

== See also ==
- List of schools in Peterborough
