= Betty Johnson (physicist) =

American physicist

- Born: 18 October 1936
- Died: 11 September 2003 (aged 66)
- Education: University of Manchester, Imperial College London
- Known for: Daphne Jackson Trust

Elizabeth "Betty" Johnson PhD (18 October 1936 – 11 September 2003) was an American theoretical physicist with a PhD in elementary particle theory, who was awarded an MBE in 2002 for "services to people returning to careers in science, engineering and technology". Johnson was influential in establishing the Daphne Jackson Trust and was one of the first women to receive a fellowship after a career break for family commitments. Johnson died after a long fight with breast cancer on September 11th, 2003.

== Career and research ==
Johnson was born in Philadelphia. She received a BA in physics and mathematics at Swarthmore College, Pennsylvania in 1958. She completed a PhD in elementary particle physics at the University of Manchester with support of the State Department Fulbright Scholarship scheme between 1958 – 1960, and an honorary Woodrow Wilson fellow. She continued her research in the University of Pittsburgh, University of Wisconsin–Madison, King's College London and the University of Auckland. Johnson held several part-time positions at the University of Surrey whilst raising two children. In 1975 Johnson was elected a fellow of the Institute of Physics.

Her research interests evolved from elementary particle theory to gas dynamics and spin-dependent effects in semiconductors. Her work focused on understanding fundamental physics and using it to predict the properties of real materials.

During her time at the University of Surrey, Johnson became a colleague and friend of Daphne Jackson, the first woman in the United Kingdom to become a professor of physics. When Daphne Jackson began to award fellowships for women who wanted to resume research after taking a break from their careers; Johnson was one of the first recipients. In 1986 Johnson joined the Condensed Matter Theory Group at Imperial College London.

Johnson was crucial in establishing the Daphne Jackson Trust after Jackson's death in 1992. She became a trustee in 2002, as well as sitting on the council of the Women's Engineering Society. She was awarded in an MBE for her commitment to women in science in 2002.
