= Charles Adderley =

Charles Adderley may refer to:

- Charles Adderley, 1st Baron Norton (1814–1905), British politician
- Charles Adderley, 2nd Baron Norton (1846–1926)
- Charles Adderley (cricketer) (1912–1985), English First class cricketer

== See also ==
- Adderley (disambiguation)
