= Dorothy Hatfield =

British aeronautical engineer

- Born: January 1940
- Died: 16 April 2024 (aged 84)
- Occupation: Aeronautical engineer
- Employer: Vickers-Armstrongs

Dorothy Helen Hatfield OBE FRAeS (née McRither) (January 1940 – 16 April 2024) was a British aeronautical engineer. In 1956, she was the first female engineering apprentice at Vickers-Armstrongs (Aircraft), Brooklands. She became President of the Women's Engineering Society and was instrumental in setting up the Daphne Jackson Trust and the Lady Finniston Award for first year female engineering students. Hatfield was appointed an OBE for services to engineering in the 2014 Birthday Honours.

== Early life and education ==
Dorothy McRither was born in January 1940 and brought up in Surrey. She left school at 16 and, in 1956, successfully applied to be an engineering apprentice at Vickers-Armstrongs (Aircraft) Ltd, Brooklands, the first woman to do so. After six years, she graduated with a first class honours degree in aeronautical engineering.

McRither married a fellow apprentice and took his surname Hatfield. They had three children who Hatfield took a career break to raise.

== Career ==
Hatfield then returned to work in the flight simulation industry, working in the technical publications department of Redifon Flight Simulation, before moving into Sales Engineering. She then worked the science and engineering division of a software house before becoming a Pricing Manager at Rediffusion. She was Trust Executive to the Daphne Jackson Trust for a time. She worked as a Contracts Manager at the Quadrant Group which manufactured aircraft parts, then at a flight simulation company in Sussex before retiring in 2001.

Hatfield joined the Women's Engineering Society in 1962 and was its president from 1989 to 1991, overseeing the ninth International Conference of Women Engineers and Scientists in Warwick in 1990. She became a Fellow of the Royal Aeronautical Society in 1996.

== Recognition ==
For her work with the Women's Engineering Society, Hatfield was awarded the Isabel Hardwich Medal in 2007 and an OBE in 2014 for her services to engineering.

== See also ==
Janet Gulland became the first female graduate apprentice at Vickers-Armstrongs in 1958.
