= William Adderley =

William Adderley may refer to:

- Bill Adderley (born 1948), British businessman
- William Adderley (MP) (fl. 1369–1403), English politician
