= Fletton =

Coordinates: 52.56°N 0.24°W

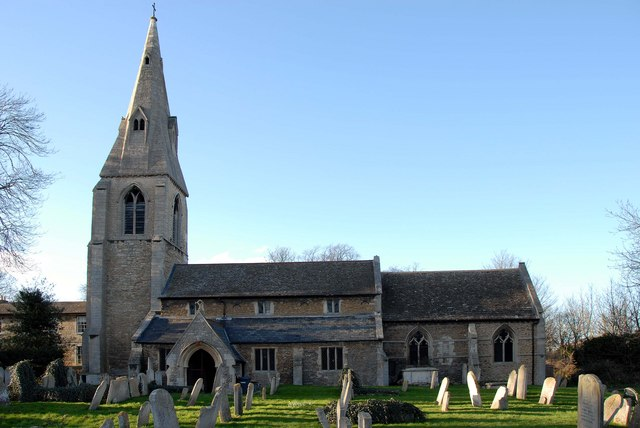
- St Margaret's Church, Old Fletton

- Location within Cambridgeshire
- Unitary authority: Peterborough
- Ceremonial county: Cambridgeshire
- Region: East
- Country: England
- Sovereign state: United Kingdom
- Post town: PETERBOROUGH
- Postcode district: PE2
- Dialling code: 01733

Fletton is an area of the city of Peterborough, in the Peterborough district, in the ceremonial county of Cambridgeshire, England, south of the River Nene.

Notable for its large brickworks, the area has given its name to "Fletton bricks".

== Administration ==
Lying south of the River Nene, the area was historically part of Huntingdonshire (although not the present district of that name), rather than the Soke of Peterborough in Northamptonshire. It was divided into Old Fletton, which prior to the Local Government Act 1972 formed a separate town with its own council (Old Fletton Urban District) and New Fletton which, from 1874, was administered as part of Peterborough Municipal Borough. Some maps still show New Fletton (on the south bank of the river) as well as Old Fletton (further to the south) with the boundary at Fletton Spring. In 1891 the parish had a population of 2194. In 1894 the parish of Fletton was split into "Fletton Rural" and "Fletton Urban". On 1 April 1938 Fletton Rural was renamed "Fletton". In 1961 the (Rural) parish had a population of 11,677. On 1 April 1974 the parish was abolished.

In 1965, the administrative counties of Huntingdonshire and the Soke of Peterborough amalgamated as Huntingdon and Peterborough and, in 1974, Fletton became part of the Peterborough district of non-metropolitan Cambridgeshire. In 1998, the city became a unitary authority area, but it continues to form part of Cambridgeshire for ceremonial purposes. Fletton falls within North West Cambridgeshire parliamentary constituency.

== Industry ==
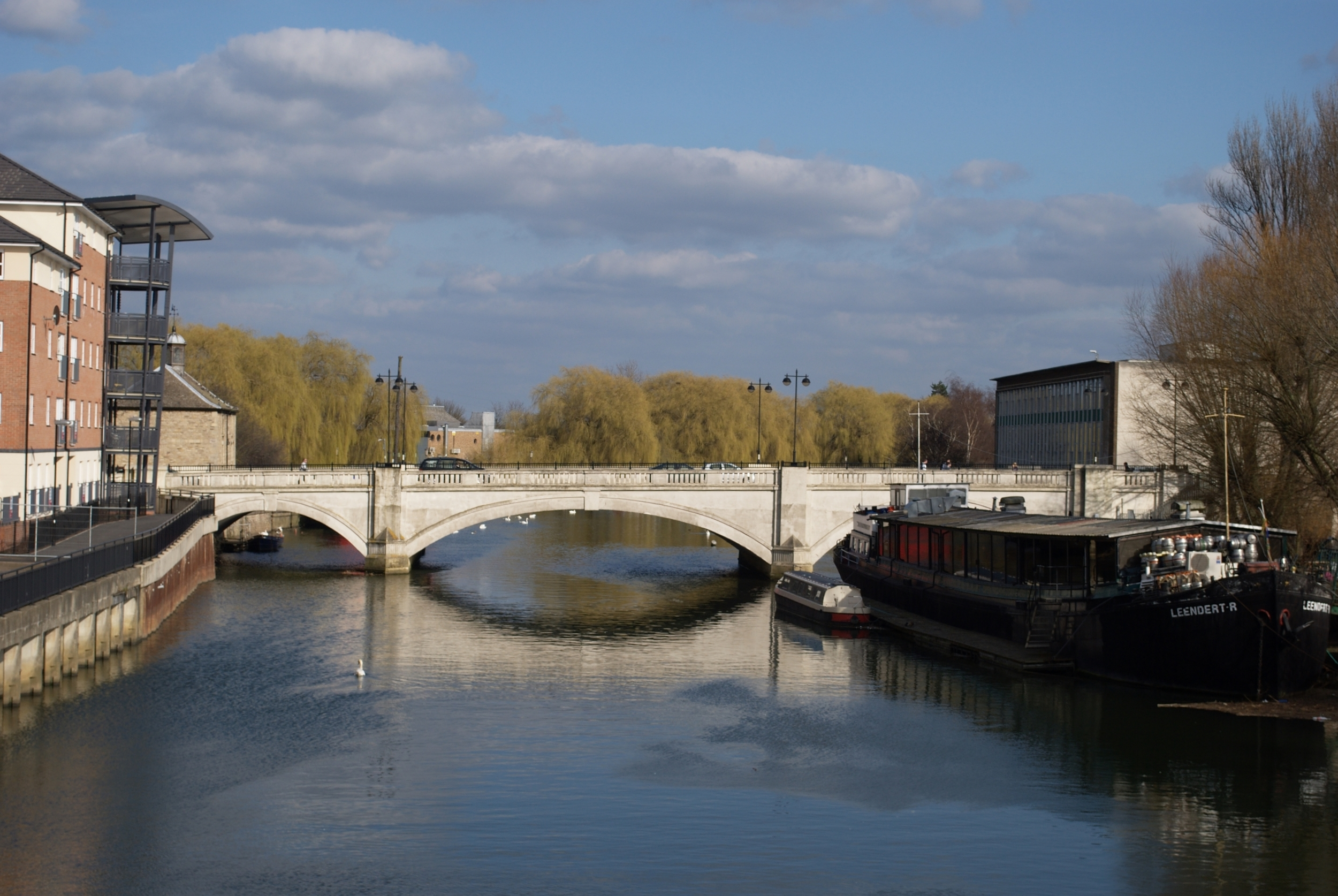
Town Bridge (1934) over the River Nene, traditional boundary between the Soke of Peterborough and Huntingdonshire

The sub-soil is Oxford clay, the character of which led to the establishment of large brickworks which were economical to excavate. The area gave its name to the Fletton Brick Company and to Fletton Brick in the 19th century, when a large area of land was sold to investors; this eventually became the London Brick Company, now owned by Forterra plc. The dominance of London Brick in the market during this period gave rise to some of the country's best known landmarks, built using the ubiquitous Flettons.

During the 1950s the requirement for workers in the brick industry was far greater than the numbers available locally, and as a result many Italians—initially housed in the old prisoner of war camps and in barracks and hostels belonging to the company—were recruited from the impoverished southern regions of Apulia and Campania. By 1960, approximately 3,000 Italian men were employed by London Brick, mostly at the Fletton works. Very soon after the first men had arrived, they were followed by around 2,000 Italian women, some of whom worked alongside the men, whilst others worked in sectors such as clothing, rubber, ceramics, food processing, agriculture and the National Health Service. Consequently, Fletton has a significant Italian population today. The Fleet complex, off the High Street, has been managed by the Italian Community Association since it opened in 1985 and accommodates the Italian honorary consul for Peterborough.

Historically, diesel manufacturers, Perkins Engines (previously Joseph Farrow & Co.'s canning factory) and Bennie Lifts (later Kone) also gave work to a large number of people locally. Elliot Medway, manufacturers of mobile classrooms, occupied a site on Glebe Road until its demolition in 2008, to make way for regeneration of the south bank.

== Amenities ==
The Church of England parish church, situated on Fletton Avenue, is dedicated to Saint Margaret of Antioch. Although in the Diocese of Ely, it has been placed under the pastoral care of the Bishop of Peterborough, acting as Assistant Bishop in the Diocese of Ely. St Margaret's Church is a Grade I listed building.

Fletton cemetery, also on Fletton Avenue, opened for burials in 1893. The former Italian Catholic mission church of Saint Anthony (San Antonio) was run by the Scalabrini Fathers for many years.

Old Fletton County Primary School is located in the area; secondary pupils attend nearby Stanground Academy and Nene Park Academy in Orton Longueville.

Late 19th century maps show Fletton Spring rising in the west of the area (in what is now Orton Goldhay); since the development of the area the first sign of the spring is near Celta Road but it soon disappears underground, re-emerging near Fletton Fields, before being fenced in again and eventually merging with Stanground Lode in the east.

Peterborough United F.C. play at the London Road Stadium in Fletton.

158 (Royal Anglian) Transport Regiment (Volunteers), Royal Logistic Corps is headquartered at the Territorial Army centre on London Road.

The Fletton Quays development comprises 6.4 hectares of previously derelict land and vacant buildings between the river and the Peterborough–March railway line.

== Notable people ==
- Peter Peckard (c. 1718 – 1797), Vice-Chancellor of Cambridge University and abolitionist, was rector of St Margaret's Church
- Alfred Nicholson Leeds (1847 – 1917) made several palaeontological discoveries in the Fletton brick pits
- Frederick Wallace Edwards (1888 – 1940), entomologist, was born in Fletton
- Author L. P. Hartley (1895 – 1972) spent his childhood at Fletton Tower

== See also ==
- Fletton railway station
