= Stanground Wash =

Nature reserve in Peterborough, England

Coordinates: 52.562°N 0.219°W

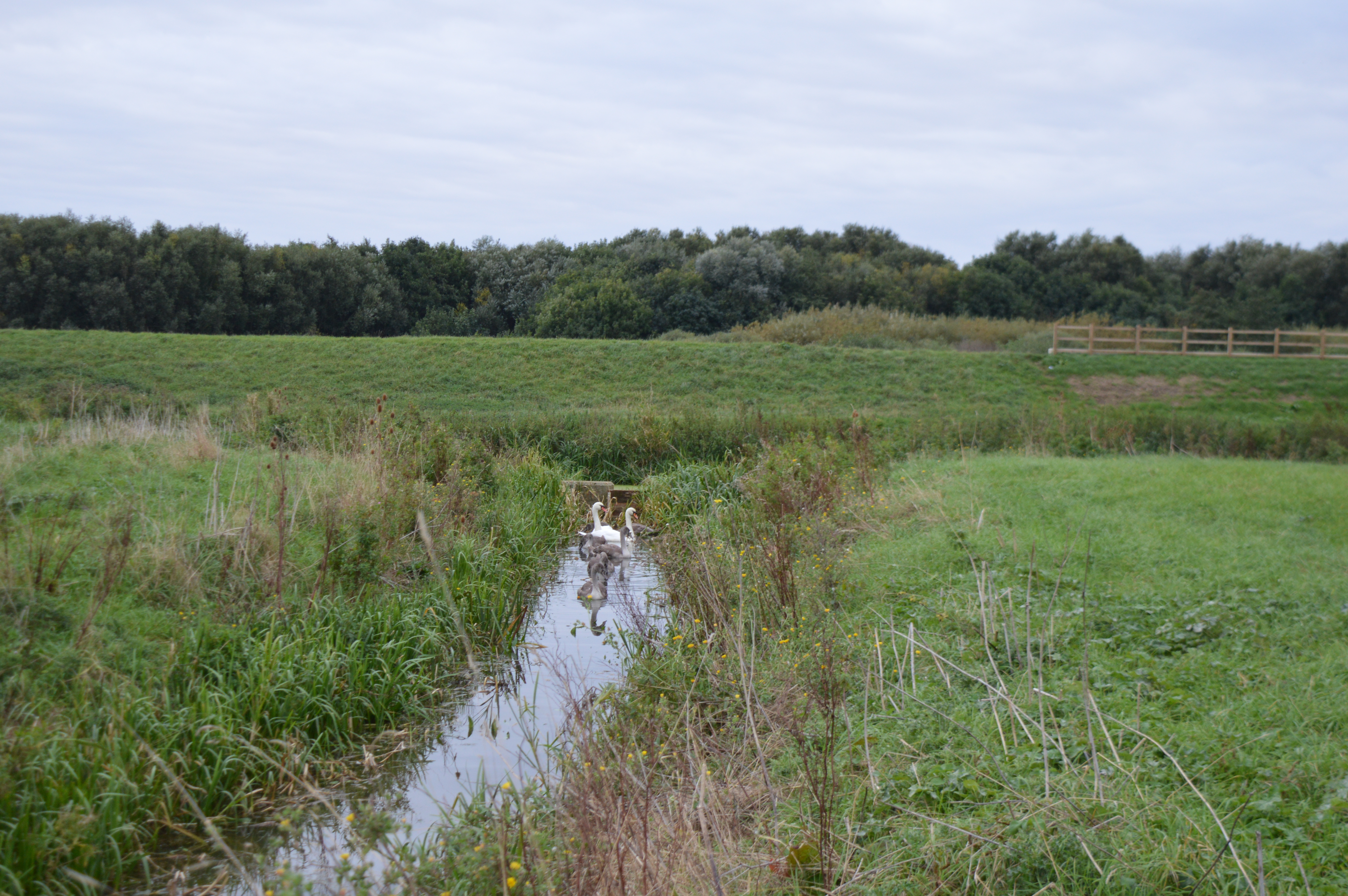
- Interactive map of Stanground Wash
- Type: Nature reserve
- Location: Stanground, Peterborough, Cambridgeshire
- OS grid: TL 208 975
- Area: 26 hectares (64 acres)
- Manager: Wildlife Trust for Bedfordshire, Cambridgeshire and Northamptonshire

Stanground Wash is a 26 hectare nature reserve in Stanground, a suburb of Peterborough in Cambridgeshire. It is managed by the Wildlife Trust for Bedfordshire, Cambridgeshire and Northamptonshire.

The site is sandwiched between the railway, Hereward line and Back River, a tributary of the River Nene. It is grassland which is flooded in winter, providing a refuge for waterbirds, and is grazed in the summer. It has a variety of birds such as snipe, redshanks and sandpipers, and ditches with rare beetles.

There is access by a footpath from North Street along the south bank of the river to a footbridge, but there is a locked gate 100 yards before the bridge.

== See also ==
- Stanground Newt Ponds
