= Eastern Angles Theatre Company =

Eastern Angles is a professional rural touring theatre company based in Ipswich. The company specialises in touring new writing across the East of England to theatres, village halls, community venues in Suffolk, Norfolk, Essex and Cambridgeshire. Eastern Angles has been running since 1982 and have also toured shows to Edinburgh Festival Fringe. The Artistic Director is Ivan Cutting.

== History ==
Eastern Angles was established in 1982 by Ivan Cutting, Pat Whymark, David Caddick, Lawrence Werber and Jan Farmery. The theatre company's work focuses on new writing and themes of place and heritage. Ivan Cutting is the Artistic Director of the company.

Eastern Angles toured its first show, Marsh Fever, in April to June 1982 in Suffolk. Since then, the company have been running for over 30 years and extended its work to venues in Norfolk, Essex and Cambridgeshire. Some of Eastern Angles' work has toured to London venues including I Caught Crabs in Walberswick at the Bush Theatre in 2008, I Heart Peterborough played at the Soho Theatre in 2012 and The Long Life & Good Fortune of John Clare at The Pleasance in Islington. They tour work to Edinburgh Festival Fringe, most recently with Chicken in 2015 at Summerhall in Paines Plough's Roundabout venue.

As well as performing at established theatres, the company is known for transforming non-conventional places into performance spaces including fire stations, garden centres, airfields, aircraft hangars and farmyard barns.

Since the 1980s, Eastern Angles have based themselves at the Sir John Mills Theatre in Ipswich. In 2008, the company set up a second base in Peterborough and are currently based at Chauffeur's Cottage in the centre of the city. Eastern Angles also own a theatre space in Peterborough known as The Undercroft at Serpentine Green Shopping Centre.

In September 2023, Eastern Angles formed a Youth Theatre club for children aged 7-13. In September 2024, they formed a Young Company for older children aged 14-18. Since January 2025, the groups have performed three plays as part of the 2025 and 2026 National Theatre Connections Festival.

Eastern Angles is funded by Arts Council England. The company is a National Portfolio Organisation and has secured funding until 2022.

Notable actors and creatives that have worked with the company include Alistair McGowen in Goodbye America in 1990, Arthur Darvill as composer for I Heart Peterborough in 2012 and writer Molly Davies for Chicken in 2015, the first female winner of the Pinter Commission at the Royal Court Theatre. Eastern Angles' patron is Monty Python collaborator, Neil Innes.

== Productions ==
1980s:

- Marsh Fever
- Vital Statistics
- When the Boats Came In
- No Song No Supper
- Barters Green
- Marsh Fever (revised)
- The Reapers Year
- Natural Causes
- Devil on the Heath
- On the Home Front
- Medieval Miracle
- Tale of the Turf
- John Barleycorn
- Moll Flanders
- Mr Pickwick's Victorian Christmas
- Waterland
- Shout!
- Mr Pickwick Goes to Town

1990s:

- Peddars Way
- Goodbye America
- Sherlock Holmes & The Missing Carol
- The Way We Live Now
- Waterland
- Phileas Fogg's Great Eastern Gallivant
- Peculiar People
- Song of Provence
- When The Boats Came In (Revival)
- Father Brown
- Hereward: The First English Rebel
- Beneath the Waves
- Inheritance
- Lord Peter Wimsey & The Bergholt Bells
- A Bad Case of Love
- The Sutton Hoo Mob
- Kid
- Sherlock Holmes & The Mummy's Tomb
- David Copperfield
- The Reapers Year (Revival)
- Sexton Blake & The Orford Oysters
- Blending In
- Fields
- Pirates of Pin Mill
- No Name
- The Wuffings
- The Ghost of the Old Rep
- A Warning to the Curious
- The Bluethroat
- Ferry Across The Waveney
- Message from Neptune
- Days of Plenty
- Joans Quick and the Temple of Time

2000s:

- Margaret Catchpole
- In the Bleak Midwinter
- Timelords of Tacket Street
- Tithe War!
- Crossroad Blues
- Parson Combs & The Ballad of Mad Dog Creek
- The Walsingham Organ
- Boudicca's Babes
- East Anglian Psychos
- Bats Over Bleedham Market
- The Last Laugh
- Bone Harvest
- David Copperfield (National Revival)
- Doubloon!
- Edge of the Land
- Margaret Down Under
- Another Three Sisters
- Masters of Mayhem
- A Dulditch Angel
- Beyond the Breakers
- The Day the Earth Wobbled a Bit!
- The Anatomist
- The Sutton Hoo Mob (Revival)
- Birds Without Wings
- East Anglian Psychos (Revival)
- Blood Beast Horror
- Truckstop
- Peapickers
- Crampons of Fear!
- I Caught Crabs in Walberswick
- Cuckoo Teapot
- Tiata Delights
- We Didn't Mean to Go to Sea
- The Haunted Commode
- Egusi Soup
- Return to Akenfield
- The Lion & Unicorn
- Lincoln Road
- Getting Here
- Masnfield Park & Ride

2010s:

- Palm Wine & Stout
- The Long Way Home
- Tales from the Middle of Town
- Bentwater Roads
- Our Nobby
- Gills Around The Green
- Up Out O'The Sea
- Crossed Keys
- Round the Twist!
- Private Resistance
- Margaret Catchpole
- I Heart Peterborough
- The Long Life & Great Good Fortune of John Clare
- Dial M for Murgatroyd
- Dark Earth
- Parkway Dreams
- The Brontes of Dunwich Heath (& Cliff)
- Once Upon A Lifetime
- Palm Wine & Stout (Revival Tour)
- Ragnarök
- River Lane
- The Mystery of St Finnigan's Elbow
- Oysters
- Sid & Hettie
- Mary and the Midwives
- Chicken
- Parkway Dreams (Revival Tour)
- Nativity Blues
- Holy Mackerel!
- Somewhere in England
- Red Skies
- We Didn't Mean To Go To Sea (Revival Tour)
- Future Floodlands
- Ground
- The (Fletton) Railway Children
- Stoat Hall
- The Strange Undoing of Prudencia Hart
- The Trials of Mary
- The Ladykillers of Humber Doucy Lane
- POLSTEAD
- Everything Must Go!
- The Fenland Screamers
- The Tide Jetty

2020s:

- Famous Four and a Half
- The Ballad of Maria Marten
- Patient Light
- Little Red
- Medieval Miracles
- Stones in His Pockets
- The Deep
- A Christmas Carol
- Sophia
- Treasure Island
