= Marilyn Wright =

Marilyn Wright may refer to:

- Marilyn Wright, who, with her husband Ralph Wright, operates the Rock N Roll McDonald's in Chicago
- Marilyn Wright, co-founder of British retailer Kiddicare
