= Marjorie Pollard =

British field hockey player and writer (1899-1982)

Personal information
- Born: 3 August 1899 Rugby, Warwickshire, England
- Died: 21 March 1982 (aged 82) Bampton, Oxfordshire, England
- Height: 5 ft 7 in (170 cm)

Sport
- Country: United Kingdom
- Sport: Hockey

Marjorie Anne Pollard OBE (3 August 1899 – 21 March 1982) was an English field hockey and cricket player, film maker and writer. She was the first woman to commentate on sport for the BBC.

== Early life ==
Marjorie Pollard was born in Rugby, Warwickshire. She was educated at Peterborough County Grammar School for Girls, and St Peter's College, Saltley.

== Sports career ==
Pollard played for Northamptonshire county hockey association. She played hockey nearly every year for England from 1921 to 1937, playing 37 times and winning 41 caps.

In October 1926, Pollard joined with several other women – all leading hockey players – help found the Women's Cricket Association. In July 1929, the WCA organised their first public match: London and District v Rest of England. The game was held in Beckenham, with Pollard playing for the latter team.

She edited and wrote the weekly Hockey Field for 24 years, and founded and then edited for 19 years from 1930, Women's Cricket. She also wrote for the newspapers The Observer, The Morning Post and The Evening News. Pollard was the first woman to commentate on sport for the BBC, for a men's cricket match in 1935.

Pollard narrowly missed the selection for the first England Women cricket tour of Australia in 1934-35. She was considered past her best when Australia returned the trip three years later.

In 1965, she was awarded an OBE.

She was a keen film maker and although she did not play in the 1938 hockey match between England and Wales, she filmed it. She filmed it at the same time as the BBC, but her film was in colour. Her films have recently been digitised.

== Death and tribute ==
In March 1982, suffering ill-health and the death of her long-term household companion May Morton, Pollard committed suicide with a shotgun.

In 2020, a blue plaque was unveiled in her memory on the site of her former school, the County Grammar School in Peterborough, by the local Civic Society.
