= Stanground =

Residential area of Peterborough, Cambridgeshire, England

Coordinates: 52°33′11″N 0°13′05″W

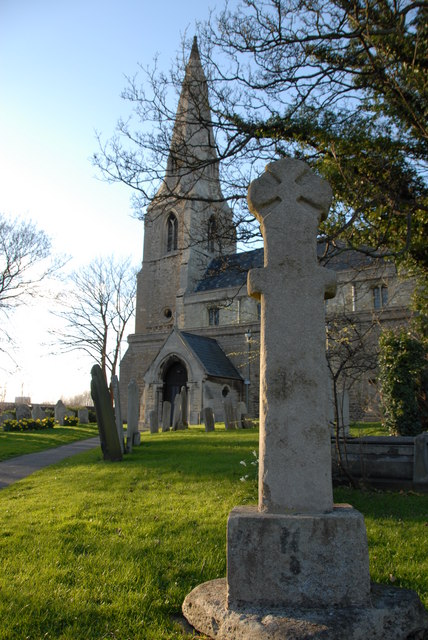
- 12th century Lampass Cross in the churchyard of St John the Baptist & St Michael & All Angels, Stanground

- Location within Cambridgeshire
- OS grid reference: TL207966
- Unitary authority: Peterborough
- Shire county: Cambridgeshire
- Region: East
- Country: England
- Sovereign state: United Kingdom
- Post town: PETERBOROUGH
- Postcode district: PE2
- Dialling code: 01733

Stanground is a residential area of Peterborough, in the ceremonial county of Cambridgeshire, England. For electoral purposes, it comprises the Stanground South and Fletton & Stanground wards in the North West Cambridgeshire constituency.

== Overview ==
Situated south of the River Nene, on relatively high ground overlooking The Fens, the area was historically part of the Isle of Ely in Cambridgeshire and of Huntingdonshire, rather than the Soke of Peterborough in Northamptonshire. By 1901 Stanground was the only civil parish in England contained partly in two administrative counties. In 1901 the parish had a population of 1461. On 1 April 1905 the part in the county of Huntingdon was designated a separate parish, Stanground South, within Old Fletton Urban District and the anomaly removed; the remainder, in Thorney Rural District, becoming Stanground North. In 1965 Huntingdonshire and the Soke amalgamated as Huntingdon and Peterborough and the Isle of Ely and historic Cambridgeshire (excluding Thorney Rural District which transferred to Huntingdon and Peterborough) amalgamated as Cambridgeshire and the Isle of Ely. In 1974 Thorney Rural District and Old Fletton Urban District became part of the current district in the new non-metropolitan county. As part of a rural district prior to the passing of the Act, Stanground North remained parished. This redundant parish which contained no dwellings or residents was finally abolished on 1 April 2004.

The ecclesiastical parish of Saint John the Baptist in the Diocese of Ely covers the whole area. However, it has now been placed under the pastoral care of the Bishop of Peterborough, acting as Assistant Bishop in the Diocese of Ely. Lampass Cross, a 12th-century scheduled monument, stands in the churchyard. The parish, along with its church, appears as Stoneground in the ghost stories of E. G. Swain, who was vicar there from 1905–1916. Situated adjacent to the fire station, Stanground cemetery, which opened in 1890, has limited grave availability for those residents who have family already buried there.

Stanground St. Johns Church of England (Voluntary Controlled) Primary School, Oakdale Primary School, Southfields Infant and Junior schools, Heritage Park Primary School and St. Michael's Church of England (Voluntary Aided) School are located in the area; secondary pupils attend Stanground Academy.

Cambridgeshire Fire and Rescue Service maintain a fire station, crewed day and night and equipped with Water Tender and Multistar (aerial platform), off Whittlesey Road.

== Notable people ==
- Raymond Smythies (1824–1861), cricketer

== See also ==
- Counties (Detached Parts) Act 1844
- Stanground Newt Ponds
- Stanground Wash
