= Raymond Smythies =

English cricketer, clergyman, and educator

Personal information
- Full name: Raymond Brewster Smythies
- Born: 18 June 1824; Stanground, Huntingdonshire, England
- Died: 19 January 1861 (aged 36); Brighton, Sussex, England
- Batting: Unknown

Domestic team information
- Years: Team
- 1854: Marylebone Cricket Club

Career statistics
| Competition | First-class |
|---|---|
| Matches | 3 |
| Runs scored | 14 |
| Batting average | 3.50 |
| 100s/50s | –/– |
| Top score | 7* |
| Catches/stumpings | 2/– |
- Source: Cricinfo, 12 September 2019

Raymond Brewster Smythies (18 June 1824 – 19 January 1861) was an English first-class cricketer, clergyman and educator.

Descended from an old Essex family, Smythies was born to the Reverend Henry Yeats Smythies in June 1824 at Stanground, Huntingdonshire. He studied at Emmanuel College, Cambridge. He graduated from Cambridge in 1847 and was ordained as a deacon at Worcester in the same year. He completed his master's at Cambridge in 1850, the same year that he made his debut in first-class cricket, when he played for the North in the North v South fixture at Lord's. He made two additional first-class appearances in the 1850s. The first came for the Gentlemen of the North against the Gentlemen of the South at Lord's in 1852, while the second came for the Marylebone Cricket Club against Oxford University in 1854. He worked as an assistant master at Rugby School between 1847 and his death at Brighton in January 1861. He had married in 1859 and had issue.
