= Adderley (disambiguation) =

Adderley is a village in England.

Adderley may also refer to:

- Adderley (surname)
- Adderley Head, a headland on Banks Peninsula
- Adderley Street, road in Cape Town, South Africa
- Adderley Park, park in Birmingham, England
- Adderley Green, village in Staffordshire, England

== See also ==
- Adderly, 1980s Canadian TV drama
- Atterley, village in Shropshire, England
