= Dunelm Group =

British home furnishings retailer

Dunelm Group plc
- Type: Public
- Traded as: LSE: DNLM; FTSE 250 Component
- Industry: Soft furnishing retailing and manufacturing (Homewares)
- Founded: 1979; 47 years ago in Leicester, England
- Founders: Bill Adderley; Jean Adderley
- Headquarters: Syston, England, UK
- Area served: United Kingdom; Jersey Ireland
- Key people: Alison Brittain; (Chair); Clodagh Moriarty; (Chief Executive Officer)
- Products: Homewares – dining; cookshop; crafts; pictures and mirrors; lighting; storage; flowers and decor; rugs and doormats; duvets and pillows; bathroom; fabrics and custom curtains; blinds; bedlinen; furniture; pets; cushions; throws and beanbags; curtain tracks and poles; Pausa coffee shop
- Revenue: ▲£1,825.5 million (2026)
- Operating income: ▲£224.9 million (2026)
- Net income: ▼£155.5 million (2026)
- Number of employees: 12,281 (2026)
- Website: www.dunelm.com

Dunelm Group plc, trading as Dunelm, is a British home furnishings retailer operating in Great Britain, Ireland and Jersey. One of the largest homeware retailers in the UK, the company headquarters are in Syston, England. It is listed on the London Stock Exchange and is a constituent of the FTSE 250 Index. Until 2013 the company traded as Dunelm Mill.

== History ==
Dunelm was founded in 1979 by Bill Adderley and Jean Adderley, trading in home textiles from a market stall in Leicester. The first Dunelm store opened in Churchgate Leicester in 1984 with the first superstore opening in Rotherham in 1991. In 1996, Will Adderley took over responsibility for the day-to-day running of the company from his father, Bill Adderley. The expansion of Dunelm continued with a new head office and warehouse being established in 1999 in Syston, Leicestershire.

In 2001, the company ventured into manufacturing, acquiring Bellbird producing custom-made curtains, blinds, and accessories, with the facility now being known as Dunelm's Manufacturing Centre. On reaching their 50th store (Walsall) Dunelm opened a new warehouse in Burton. Key appointments were made in 2003 with David Stead being brought in as Finance Director; this also coinciding with Dunelm's 60th store (Ilkeston) and the roll-out of EPOS. 2004 saw the company appointing Geoff Cooper as Non-Executive chairman and Marion Sears as a non-executive director. It also saw the opening of their 70th store (Trafford). Two years later Dunelm opened its 80th store (Bradford), a new distribution centre in Stoke, and launched their online shopping facility, offering 13,000 homewares products and floated on the London Stock Exchange.

2007 saw the appointment of Simon Emney as non-executive director followed in 2008 with their 90th store (Plymouth) and the acquisition of the worldwide rights to the 'Dorma' bed linen brand, for £5 million in July. In 2009 Dunelm appointed Nick Wharton as a non-executive director and re-launched their online shopping website. In September 2009, the company announced that Nick Wharton would be taking over from Will Adderley as Chief Executive in March 2011 with Adderley remaining at Dunelm as Executive Deputy chairman.

In September 2014, Dunelm Group plc announced that Nick Wharton had resigned his position as Chief Executive and was stepping down from the Board. Will Adderley, previously Executive Deputy chairman, resumed the role of Chief Executive with immediate effect. On 28 November 2016, the company purchased WorldStores and its subsidiary Kiddicare for £8.5 million.

On 30 August 2017 Dunelm Group plc announced that John Browett was stepping down with immediate effect as Chief Executive after two years in the role. Nick Wilkinson was appointed to replace him.

In September 2020, the company reported a large rise in sales for the months of July and August. The increased sales were a result of the increase in remote work due to the COVID-19 pandemic and investing in their living spaces.

In November 2020, the company was criticised by shareholders for renominating Paula Vennells to its board, despite her responsibility for the British Post Office scandal, during which her leadership was accused of having been "both cruel and incompetent" by a Conservative peer and various MPs. Her resignation from the board was announced on the morning of 26 April 2021 after all the remaining convictions of subpostmasters had been quashed.

In November 2024, Dunelm announced an acquisition of soft furnishing brand Home Focus, which had 13 stores in the Republic of Ireland.

In July 2025 Clodagh Moriarty was appointed as the new CEO.

== Operations ==
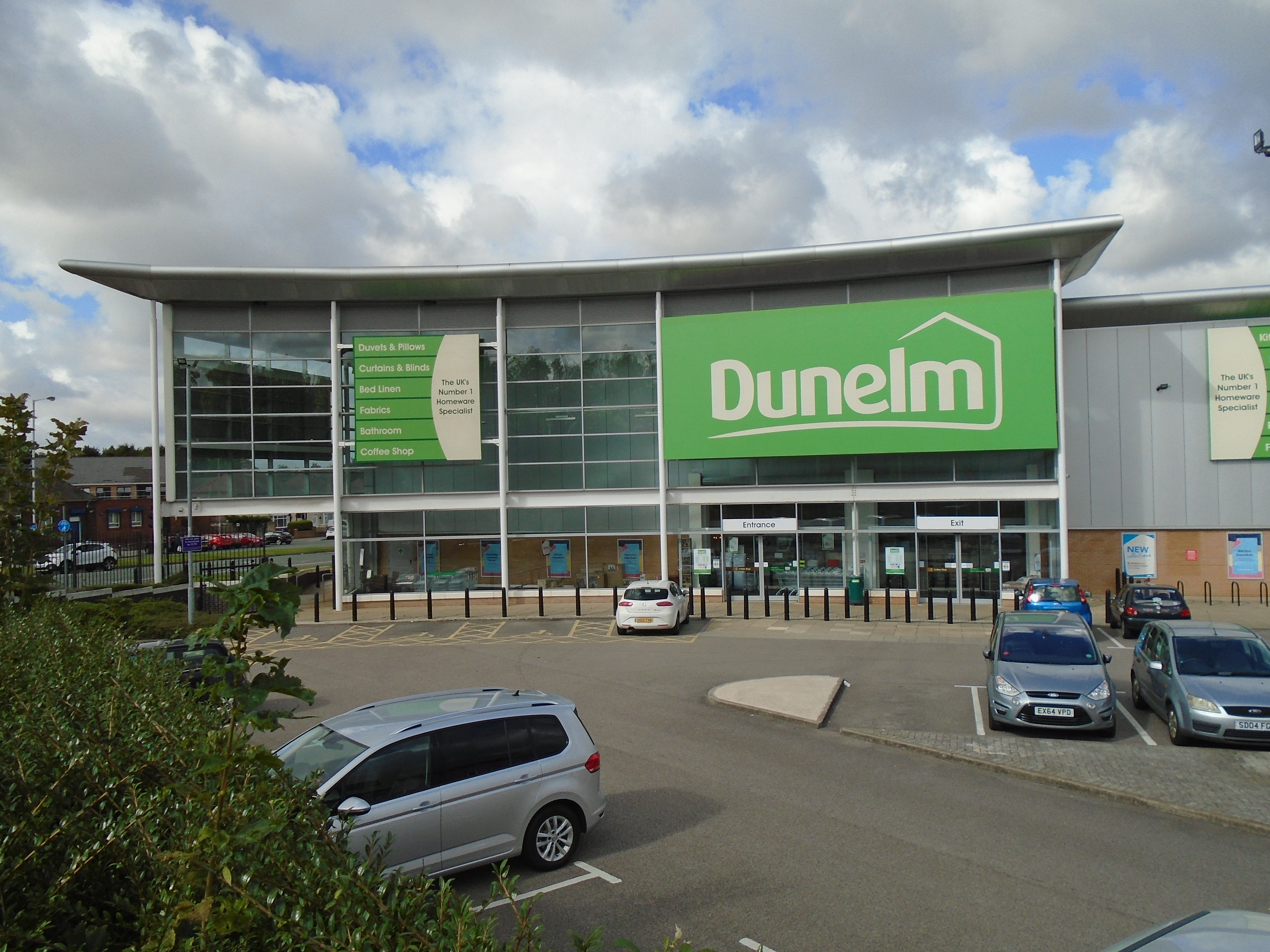
Dunelm store in Liverpool

As of 18 March 2025 Dunelm operated 200 stores, spread across the UK, and a webstore. The company operates a factory for curtains, blinds and accessories in Leicester, England.

In November 2024, Dunelm entered the Irish market with the acquisition of soft furnishings chain Home Focus at Hickeys, which had 13 shops throughout Ireland.
