= Orton, Peterborough =

Suburb of Peterborough, England

Coordinates: 52.55°N 0.29°W

Orton
- Orton Hall Hotel

- Location within Cambridgeshire
- Unitary authority: Peterborough
- Ceremonial county: Cambridgeshire
- Region: East
- Country: England
- Sovereign state: United Kingdom
- Post town: Peterborough
- Postcode district: PE2
- Dialling code: 01733
- Police: Cambridgeshire
- Fire: Cambridgeshire
- Ambulance: East of England
- UK Parliament: North West Cambridgeshire

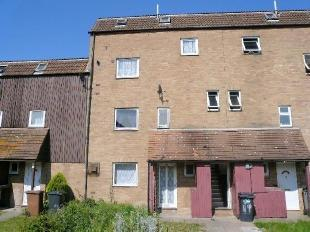
New Town architecture in the Ortons

Orton is a suburb of the City of Peterborough, in Cambridgeshire, England, about 3 miles (4.8 km) south west of Peterborough city centre to the south of the River Nene. It is located on the route of the A1.

It expanded from the villages of Orton Waterville and Orton Longueville when Peterborough was designated as a new town. It lies in the historic county of Huntingdonshire.

Today, the suburb comprises several areas whose names each begin with Orton, such as Orton Malborne. For electoral purposes it comprises Orton Longueville, Orton Waterville and Orton with Hampton wards in North West Cambridgeshire. It is served by two parish councils.

== History ==
Orton was designated the second township in the new town expansion of Peterborough in 1967. It is composed of the ancient villages of Orton Waterville and Orton Longueville, together with the newer developments of Orton Brimbles, Orton Goldhay, Orton Malborne, Orton Southgate, Orton Winyates, Orton Wistow and most recently Orton Northgate. All lie south of the River Nene and are thus historically in Huntingdonshire, but are not in the current local government district of that name.

In common with many New Towns the Ortons are characterised by extensive landscaping and tree planting. The A605 Oundle Road runs through the Ortons, connecting Peterborough to the A1(M) which runs from London to Edinburgh. There is no church in Orton Wistow or Orton Northgate: these both fall within the parish of St Andrew's, Alwalton.

As the Ortons were established, health centres were constructed, initially in Herlington and then at the Orton Centre. For a short time there was also a small branch surgery in Orton Wistow. Due to the expansion of the area and decay of the premises at Herlington, it and the Orton Wistow surgery were replaced by a new surgery at Clayton, Orton Goldhay. The former surgery at Herlington was converted into a child and family centre.

Orton has its own printed community newsletter, Orton Oracle, edited in magazine format and distributed by volunteers in the Ortons, Alwalton and Chesterton, appearing 10 times per year. Its printing is funded by advertisers. It started out in 1974 as Contact and for many years was supported by the Community Education department above the public library in the old Bushfield Community College, a secondary school at Orton Centre. In the days before desktop publishing, volunteers met to paste up the typed copy on to boards which were then sent to Westcombe Print Services. When Contact closed in 2003, its production was immediately invested in the Orton Oracle team with many of the same volunteers, but with a single editor. This was possible due to initiatives amongst supporters of Churches Together in the Ortons. Oracle remains a community newsletter with a circulation of around 7,000.

In 2001 Anglia Regional Co-operative Society closed its Rainbow supermarket at Orton Centre, the only major supermarket serving the Ortons. This was widely assumed to be due to competition from the Tesco Extra which had opened at nearby Serpentine Green in Hampton and the ongoing degeneration of the centre. In October 2008 the Co-operative returned to the Ortons with a new store in the regenerated Orton Centre, now renamed Ortongate.

== Orton Brimbles ==
This is an area of mixed public and private sector housing dating almost entirely from the 1980s. Orton Brimbles contains the Ortons' first and only purpose-built solar powered houses at Gostwick. There is also Ormiston Meadows Academy, formerly Matley Primary School, a mainstream primary school with Enhanced Resources provision for children with physical disabilities.

There is a row of shops, including a post office, at Matley which also has a community centre where the Salvation Army hold Sunday services. Orton Brimbles falls within Orton Waterville Parish Council area.

== Orton Goldhay ==
Orton Goldhay was laid out from the mid-1970s by Peterborough Development Corporation as part of the city's second township. The area is largely residential but contains the district shopping centre known as Orton Centre, and local shops at Paynels. There are three primary schools - Winyates, Braybrook, and St. John's - and one of the Ortons' two secondary schools, Ormiston Bushfield Academy. Much of the housing here was built for the public sector and originally housed overspill population from London.

The PDC also converted the old Lady Lodge Farm into an arts centre. It had resident artists. There were performance and exhibition areas, a cafe, a bar, and artists workshops. Several business operated there over the years. The centre closed, and there was vandalism and a fire, so buildings were demolished and the site disposed of by the City Council. In 2015 The Maples care home was built on the site.

== Orton Longueville ==
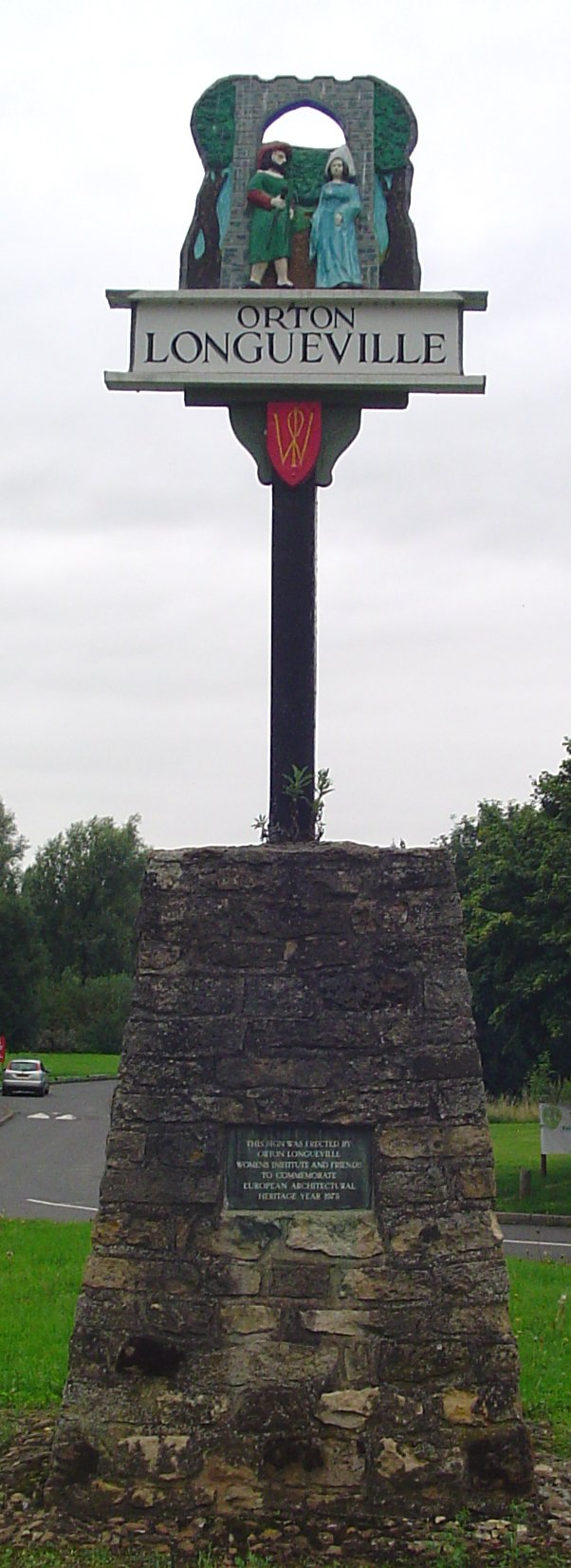
Signpost in Orton Longueville

Until the 1960s, Orton Longueville was a village separated from Peterborough by open farmland. Orton Longueville is home to Nene Park Academy, formerly Orton Longueville School. The 'village' contains many pre-20th-century buildings including Orton Hall, used as a prisoner of war camp during the Second World War and girls' special school (closed in 1990 and now a hotel), several thatched cottages, a cricket field and the 13th-century church of Holy Trinity. The church contains many historic monuments to the families who owned property in the village, including the Huntlys and Copes, and has a rare wall painting of St Christopher. There is still a village green and close by is a half-mile long plantation of giant redwood wellingtonia trees known as the 'Long Walk'.

Orton Longueville saw many homes built after the Second World War. It is cut through north–south by the Nene Parkway (A1260) constructed in the 1970s. To the west of this road lies the original 'village', and to the east is a housing estate and some light warehousing laid out on former farmland in the latter half of the 20th century. This estate also included the Gloucester Centre, an NHS residential and treatment unit for patients with learning and intellectual disabilities which was opened in October 1977 by Richard, Duke of Gloucester. It was closed to residents in 2014 and the buildings used for other NHS services until 2018 when the site was sold for housing.

To the north east is a newer housing area known as Botolph Green. Nearby is The Botolph Arms pub, opened in 1981 having been converted from a house initially built in 1749 but extended to the East in later years in a similar style, accessible from the A605 Oundle Road. The pub closed in 2025. There was a separate parish called Botolphbridge until it was combined with Longueville in 1702.

The parish includes part of Nene Park and the Nene Valley Railway line passes through with a station called Orton Mere. There is another pub, the Gordon Arms, on the Oundle Road, that was originally a 17th-century coaching inn.

== Orton Malborne ==
Similar in character to Orton Goldhay, this area was also created from the mid-1970s and lies along the dedicated bus route leading to the city centre. There are local shops at Herlington and Eldern, both of which had pubs, The Dragonfly and The Eldern (formerly The Shire Horse). Only the former remains open, the latter having been sold and converted to homes.

There is a purpose-built community centre at Herlington. A second community centre that looks like a 3-storey end of terrace house with attached hall at 156 Leighton was closed by the City Council and sold for private housing in 2009.

In the period since October 1976, five church congregations have met in the area. Christian Presence was first, established as an Anglican and later Methodist plant in a community house and later at Leighton Community Centre before moving to Herlington Community Centre in 2009. The latter has also been home to the Life Tabernacle Apostolic Church, and the building was also used by another Christian Fellowship in the 1980s. Nearby is the purpose-built St.Luke's Roman Catholic church. The Orton Gospel Hall is at the east end of Malborne Way.

There is a primary school at Leighton and one at nearby Winyates also serves the Malborne area. Herlington has a pre-school. The Lime Academy educational trust has a campus hub for children on Malborne Way built on the site of The Tunnel Adventure Playground.

== Orton Northgate ==
The latest addition to 'the Ortons' and the fastest growing, Orton Northgate previously formed part of the East of England Showground site.

Orton Northgate's local Anglican church is St Andrew's, Alwalton.

== Orton Southgate ==
This is mainly a business area containing offices and factories, including Compare the Market, NCR, Amazon, XL Displays, Yodal and others. It also contains a housing area centred on Dunblane Drive, which was partly built by Persimmon Homes around 1995, and added to by a small group of David Wilson Homes in around 1997.

The East of England Showground sold off some of its land to developers to expand the housing towards Alwalton, linking Dunblane Drive with Loch Lomond Way. However, there was a moratorium on building in October 2008, and as of February 2010 the site remained dormant.

== Orton Waterville ==
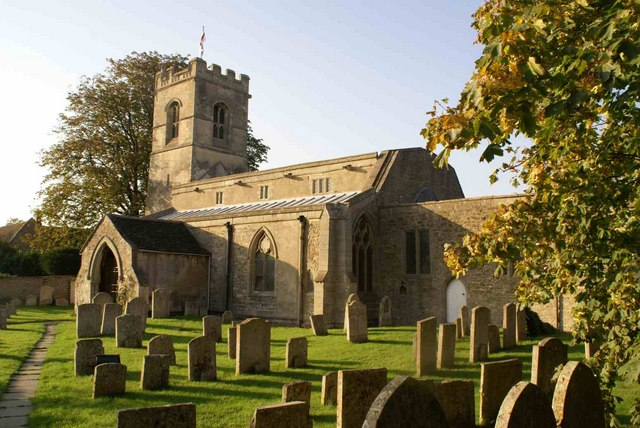
Orton Waterville St Mary's Church

One of the original 'Ortons', Orton Waterville also retains a village atmosphere and contains many thatched and stone built cottages and the 13th-century parish church of St Mary's. It once had its own Orton Waterville railway station, but both the station and the British Railways line it stood on were closed. The Overton station on the preservation Nene Valley Railway, occupy the same site.

== Orton Wistow ==
Orton Wistow was laid out during the 1980s by private developers, with the last developments being completed around 1992. This development lies adjacent to the Country Park known as Ferry Meadows and the Nene Valley Railway. There is a primary school called Orton Wistow Primary School.

== Transport ==
Three bus services serve the Ortons. Firstly, the Citi 1 runs every 10–12 minutes during the day, changing to hourly in late evening, between Orton Wistow via Orton Centre (and sometimes to and from Orton Southgate) to the city centre and continues to Werrington. Route 60 links Orton Northgate and Orton Centre with Serpentine Green, Stanground and the City Centre infrequently. Secondly, Stagecoach Midlands operate Service X4 between Northampton and the city centre, via Orton Waterville. Thirdly, Central Connect operate the 23/24/25 services between Orton Waterville and Peterborough Queensgate bus station, also connecting with Alwalton Hill or Lynch Wood.

== See also ==
- Pearl Assurance War Memorial
