= Fletton railway station =

Former railway station in Cambridgeshire, England

Coordinates: 52.5541°N 0.2442°W

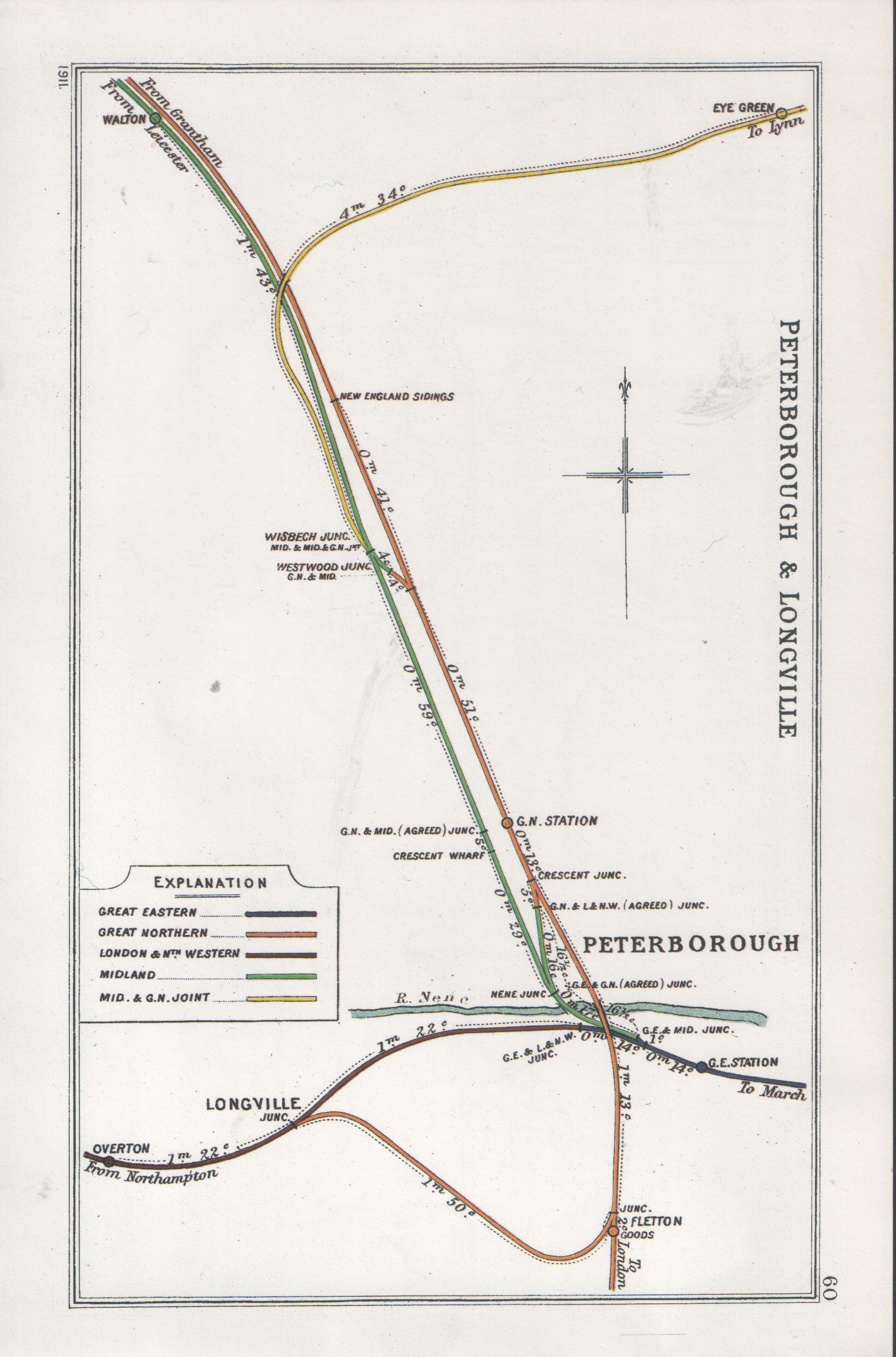
Railway Clearing House diagram of lines near Peterborough in 1911

Fletton railway station was a railway station in Fletton, Cambridgeshire just south of Peterborough. It was once home to an extensive goods yard.

Former Services

Preceding station	Disused railways	Following station
Yaxley and Farcet	Great Northern Railway	Peterborough North
