= Iqra (given name) =

Iqra is a feminine given name of Arabic origin. Notable people with the name include:

== Given name ==
- Iqra Aziz (born 1997), Pakistani actress
- Iqra Khalid (born 1985), Canadian politician
- Iqra Rasool (born 2000), Indian cricketer
- Iqra Ahmed, fictional character from EastEnders

== See also ==
- Iqra (disambiguation)
