= E. G. Swain =

English cleric and author

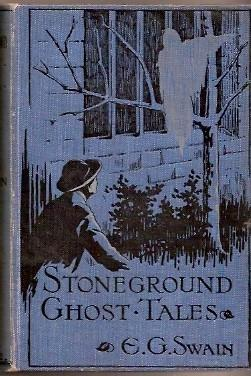
1912 original cover of The Stoneground Ghost Tales.

Edmund Gill Swain (19 February 1861 – 29 January 1938) was an English cleric and author. As a chaplain of King's College, Cambridge, he was a colleague and contemporary of the scholar and author M. R. James, and a regular member of the select group to whom James delivered his famous annual Christmas Eve reading of a ghost story composed specially for the occasion. Swain collaborated with James on topical skits for amateur performance in Cambridge, but he is known best for the collection of ghost stories he published in 1912, entitled The Stoneground Ghost Tales. He also wrote a history of Peterborough Cathedral.

== Biography ==
Swain was born in Stockport, Cheshire, and educated at Manchester Grammar School and Emmanuel College, Cambridge, where he studied Natural Sciences. He was ordained deacon in 1885 and priest in 1886 at Rochester. After six years as a curate in Camberwell, he was appointed chaplain of King's College, where M. R. James was already the Dean and a renowned scholar. Swain, like James, lived in rooms in the college during his time there, and his duties included teaching younger boys at the college's choir school.

A number of James' acquaintances later published ghost stories in the Jamesian style, notably E. F. Benson and his brother A. C. Benson, and R. H. Malden, whose first such story was written in 1909. Swain himself lived and worked in Cambridge until 1905, when he accepted the benefice of Stanground, near Peterborough, which was in the gift of his old college, Emmanuel. As "Stoneground", the parish and Swain's own church of St. John the Baptist became the setting for his volume of ghostly stories published in 1912. He and Malden have been described as the first two important imitators of James. Swain was vicar of Stanground from 1905 to 1916, followed by a seven-year ministry in the rural parish of Greenford, Middlesex, and ended his church career at Peterborough Cathedral, where he served in a variety of roles including Honorary Canon, Librarian and Precentor. He died in Peterborough on 29 January 1938. A door in Peterborough Cathedral and awards for cathedral choristers are named in his honour.

== The Stoneground Ghost Tales ==
The Stoneground Ghost Tales (W. Heffer & Sons Ltd, Cambridge, 1912) is a collection of nine short stories set in and around a church and parish on the edge of The Fens in eastern England. The protagonist, the Rector of Stoneground, the Reverend Roland Batchel, is a kindly, humane bachelor and amateur antiquarian, not unlike Swain himself. The stories' style emulates that of James, although they have been described as lacking "the unsettling, anarchic malevolence" of James' own supernatural stories, and the book itself was dedicated to James. Some of the stories have been published frequently in anthologies since their first publication, but the whole collection was republished in 1989 as Bone to His Bone: The Stoneground Ghost Tales of E.G.Swain by Equation, with an additional six stories about Stoneground and Mr. Batchel by the author David G. Rowlands, and again in 1996 by Ash-Tree Press.

== Other writing ==
- The Story of Peterborough Cathedral (R. Tuck & Sons, London, 1932)
