= Ormiston Bushfield Academy =

Secondary school in Cambridgeshire, England

Location
- Ormiston Bushfield Academy; Peterborough, Cambridgeshire, PE2 5RQ; United Kingdom

Information
- Type: Academy
- Established: 1978 (as Bushfield Community College); 2009 (as Ormiston Bushfield Academy)
- Department for Education URN: 135980 Tables
- Ofsted: Reports
- Principal: Dennis Kirwan
- Gender: Mixed
- Age: 11 to 19
- Houses: Challenger, Discovery, Endeavour, Enterprise (Red, Yellow, Blue, Green)
- Website: https://www.bushfield.co.uk

Ormiston Bushfield Academy, formerly known as Bushfield Community College, is located in the Orton area of Peterborough.

The college was first opened in 1978. The college was converted to academy status in 2009, and became Ormiston Bushfield Academy. In September 2012 students moved into a £20 million, purpose-built Academy building. The old Community College buildings were demolished in 2012/2013. An extension to the building was opened in September 2018.
