= Hampton Nature Reserve =

Nature reserve in Cambridgeshire, England

Coordinates: 52.5281°N 0.2913°W

Hampton Nature Reserve, to the south of Peterborough, England is home to Europe's largest population of great crested newts.

The site is a Special Area of Conservation as well as being a Site of Special Scientific Interest. The site is private land with no public access.

== Description ==
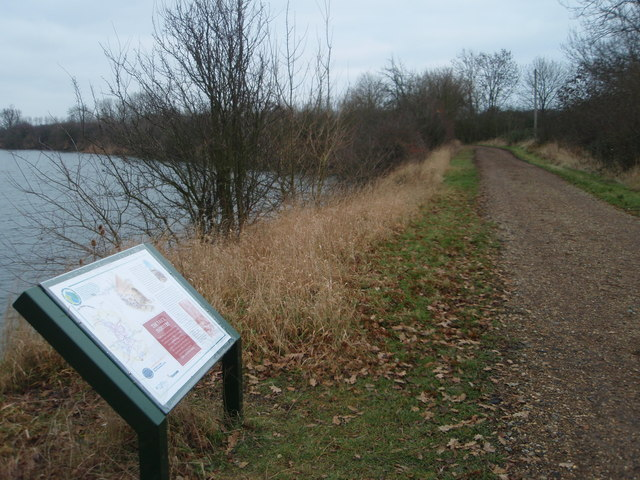
Cycle Route Next To Haddon Lake

Hampton Nature Reserve is a 300-acre site that is home to the largest population of great crested newts in Europe. The site is owned be O&H Hampton and managed by Froglife. The reserve is diverse and includes 200-year-old woodland, 340 ponds, and areas of grassland. Volunteers help Froglife with the active management of the reserve which includes building hibernacula for newts (shelters in which they can safely hibernate), tree felling to allow light onto the woodland floor, and constructing piles of rotting vegetation for grass snakes to lay their eggs in.

Adjacent to the reserve is Haddon Lake, one of many former brick pits in the Hampton area. This site provides an additional ideal habitat for newts, and a tranquil haven for other wildlife. The margins of the lake have well established reed beds that have attracted many species including the elusive bittern.

== History ==
The site was previously a working brick pit, with extraction continuing as late as the 1990s. The extraction of bricks and dumping of unwanted material is responsible for the undulating 'lunar' landscape visible on part of the reserve. Once the pit had ceased to operate, nature took over and now a large variety of wildlife has made its home at the reserve.

== Wildlife ==
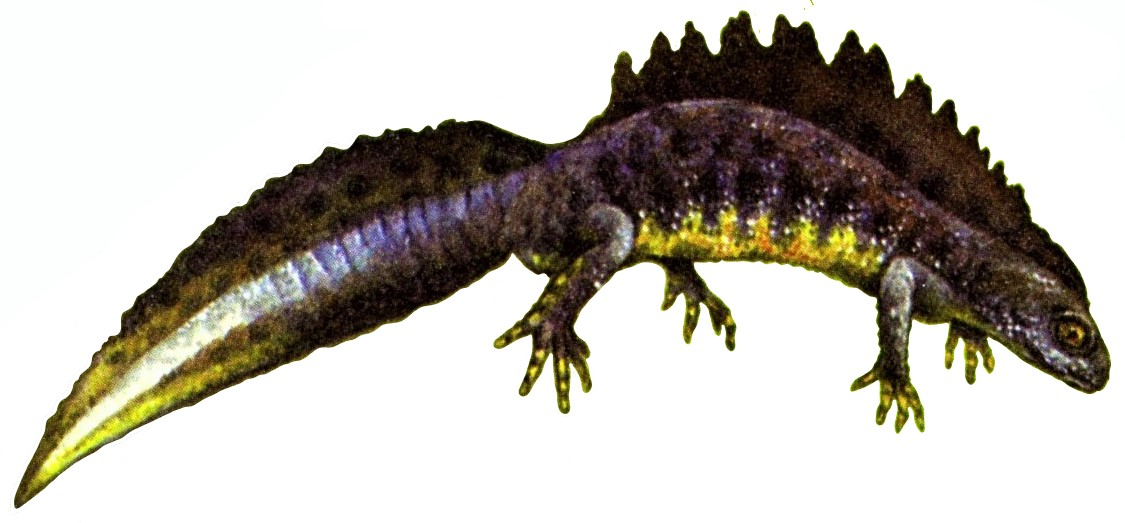
Great crested newt

Europe's largest population of great crested newts can be found at the Hampton Nature Reserve. In addition to this the site is also important for stoneworts, water voles, and is home to the only known colony of the grizzled skipper butterfly in Peterborough. Many species of tree, wildflowers such as the bee orchid, and a wide range of fauna such as green woodpeckers, bats, kestrels, grass snakes, dragonflies and damselflies can all be found at the Hampton Nature Reserve.

After the Brexit referendum, Froglife, who manages the park, warned that the wildlife in the park could be under threat if the reserve's Special Areas of Conservation was not preserved after leaving the EU.
