= Rockford Iqra School =

Location
- 5925 Darlene Drive; Rockford, Illinois; United States; 42.2355°N 89.0008°W

Information
- Type: Private
- Established: 1998
- Principal: Sister Mona Nizamuddin
- Grades: PreK–9
- Enrollment: 167(2017-2018)
- Color: Navy And light blue
- Mascot: Iqra Panthers
- Newspaper: "Iqra Roar"
- Website: Rockford Iqra School

Rockford Iqra School is an Islamic private school in Rockford, Illinois. It has students from grades Pre-K3 to 8.

== History ==
Rockford Iqra School was established in 1998 as an elementary school. The first high school class graduated in June 2010.

Students from Rockford Iqra School's first high school graduating class (2010-2017) were all accepted to college.

== Extracurriculars and clubs ==
- Knitting Club
- Nasheed Club* Math Club
