= Patrick Adderley =

Current dean of Nassau

Patrick Livingstone Adderley (born 1948) is the current dean of Nassau.

Adderley was born in Nassau in 1948. He was educated at the University of Nottingham and the House of Sacred Mission, Kelham. He was ordained deacon in 1974 and priest in 1975. After curacies in Abaco he served incumbencies in Grand Bahama. In 1983 he became principal of St. Anne's School. A decade later he was appointed deputy director for Anglican Schools in the Diocese of Nassau.
