= Daphne Jackson =

British nuclear physicist

- Born: Daphne Jackson; 23 September 1936; Peterborough, Cambridgeshire, England, United Kingdom
- Died: 8 February 1991 (aged 54); Guildford, Surrey, England, United Kingdom
- Education: Peterborough Country Grammar School; Imperial College London; University of Surrey
- Known for: First female professor of physics in the UK
- Scientific career
- Fields: Physics
- Website: daphnejackson.org

Daphne Frances Jackson OBE (23 September 1936 – 8 February 1991) was an English nuclear physicist. In 1971 she became the first female physics professor in the UK. A legacy after her death in 1991 enabled the foundation of the Daphne Jackson Trust.

== Biography ==
Daphne Frances Jackson was born in Peterborough; her father was a machine tool operator and her mother had been a textile designer before she married. Jackson went to the local grammar school, Peterborough County Grammar School for Girls, from where she was able to apply to take physics at Imperial College in London. She was one of only two female students on the course alongside 88 males.

Jackson moved to what is now called the University of Surrey at the invitation of Lewis Elton to study nuclear physics when he became head of the physics department at Battersea College of Advanced Technology. She became a lecturer and she was awarded a doctorate in 1962.

In 1971, Jackson became Britain's first female professor of physics when she was appointed by University of Surrey at the age of 34. She eventually rose to be the dean of the university as well as sitting on a range of bodies; she held a senior position at the Meteorological Office. Jackson was president of the Women's Engineering Society between 1983 and 1985, succeeding Rosemary West and succeeded by Linda Maynard. She was vice-president of the Institute of Physics, after being its youngest ever fellow.

=== Illness and death ===
Professor Jackson was diagnosed with cancer - a disease she was helping to fight through her work with the Institute for Cancer Research and the Royal Marsden Hospital. She had published 55 articles on the use of nuclear physics in medicine. She was appointed an OBE in 1987. Jackson died in Guildford in 1991 of cancer.

== Advocacy ==
Jackson campaigned for women's rights and she was disappointed to see that talented women were lost in lowly jobs because they could not re-enter their career after a break. In 1985 Jackson devised a plan to help these women by allowing them to work for two years where they could readjust to their discipline after taking a break to have a child, becoming a carer or just because they followed their husband's career rather than their own. Jackson is reported as saying, "Imagine a society that would allow Marie Curie to stack shelves in a supermarket simply because she took a career break for family reasons."

Qualified women who are unemployed or under-employed following a career break for family commitments represent an appalling waste of talent and of investment in their initial education. Many such women are eager to return to their original careers or to a new field of activity for which their initial education is relevant, provided that retraining can be given and that they can, at least initially, work on a part-time basis.

== Legacy ==
The Daphne Jackson Medal and Prize, established in 2016 and named in Jackson's honour, are awarded by the Institute of Physics "for exceptional early career contributions to physics education and to widening participation within it".

The Daphne Jackson Trust was founded in 1992, under her legacy, in order to aid many talented individuals return to their chosen careers after having a family or inevitably pausing their career. The Trust had enabled over 370 STEM researchers to go back to their chosen careers/fields by 2019 and awarded their 500th fellowship in 2024.

In 2020, a blue plaque was unveiled in her memory on the site of her former school, the County Grammar School in Peterborough, by the local Civic Society at the suggestion of her brother Ron.
