= Hampton, Peterborough =

Township south of Peterborough, England

Coordinates: 52.540°N 0.264°W

Hampton
- Location within Cambridgeshire
- Unitary authority: Peterborough
- Ceremonial county: Cambridgeshire
- Region: East
- Country: England
- Sovereign state: United Kingdom
- Post town: Peterborough
- Postcode district: PE7
- Dialling code: 01733
- UK Parliament: North West Cambridgeshire

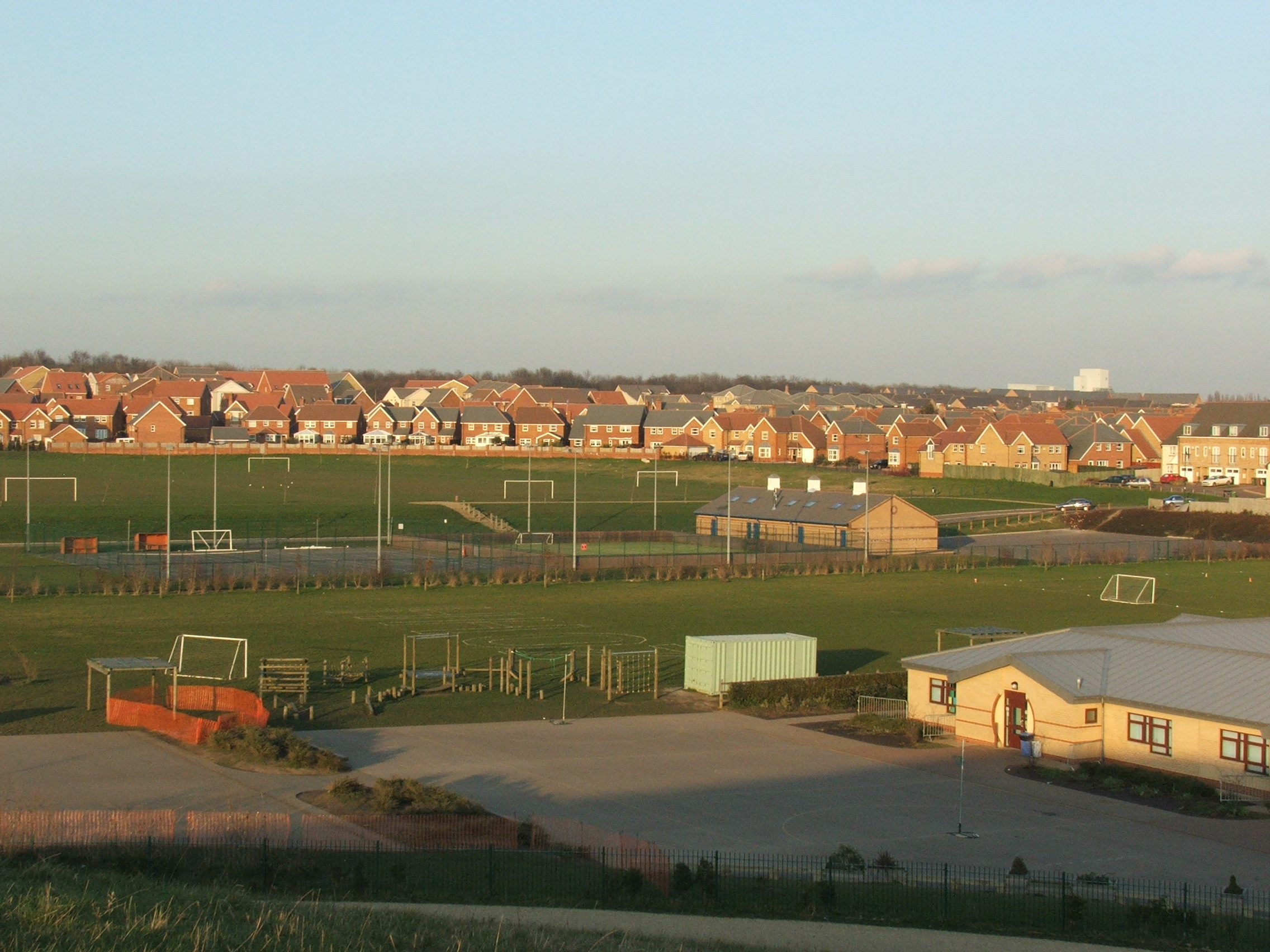
Hampton Hargate and part of primary school building in foreground.

Hampton is a suburb of the City of Peterborough in the eremonial county of Cambridgeshire, England. It is one of Peterborough's four townships. It lies south of the main built-up area of Peterborough.

== Development ==
The first two neighbourhoods to be complete are Hampton Hargate, which is home to a community of around 1,700 homes, and Hampton Vale, with approximately 1,900 homes. Each neighbourhood is based around its own local centre with community facilities, shops and primary school. Work is continuing on building a third neighbourhood at Hempsted, while planning is now underway on a fourth neighbourhood, the Hamptons, which, like other parts of Hampton, will have its own distinct character.

Adjoining these is Hampton's central and commercial area where the Serpentine Green shopping centre, Hampton College secondary and primary schools, and two business parks - Cygnet Park and Kingston Park, are located.

Eventually Hampton will have up to 8,500 new homes spread over its four local areas, with additional schools, local centres and leisure facilities, as well as commercial and retail areas providing more than 12,000 jobs. Construction started in 1996 and is scheduled to continue until at least 2023.

== Homes ==
Since the first arrivals to Holly Walk, Hampton Hargate, in 1997, more than 5000 new homes have been built at a rate of up to 500 a year. More than 30 home builders and housing associations have built schemes, including around 900 units of affordable housing.

Innovative homes schemes include a zero carbon house built in association with Morris Homes. Two self-build schemes have been included, allowing people to design and build their own homes.

== Schools ==
The success of Hampton's schools has led to rapid expansion. Hampton Hargate Primary School was built in 2000 with one entry form (FE), extended in 2002 to two FE, and further extended in 2012 to three FE. Hampton Vale Primary was built in 2004 as a one FE school, expanded to a two FE in 2002, and further extended in 2012 to three FE. A third primary school opened in 2013 on the Hampton College campus. Hampton Gardens Secondary School opened in 2017 followed by Hampton Lakes Primary School in 2020.

=== Hampton College ===
Hampton College, a secondary school built to serve Hampton, opened to years 7 and 8 in September 2005. By 2008 the school accepted students in years 7 through to 11. Further expansion, including a sixth form, was initially due for completion by 2010. Although the school will begin AS Level courses in September 2009, the date for the new buildings is currently under review. The school currently boasts an outdoor amphitheatre and is built around a courtyard setting. In the evenings, the school is used for a variety of groups and adult education classes and it is hoped that the school will eventually form the heart of the community within Hampton. The college was recently found to be 'outstanding' by Ofsted, and was rated as outstanding in 6 out of a possible 7 categories. This puts it in the top 2% of schools nationally.

== Economy ==
Hampton has a jobs-to-homes ratio of 1.25. Total rateable value of Hampton businesses now exceeds £20m.

Companies with distribution centres at Kingston Park, Hampton, include IKEA, Debenhams and Prologis. Other well-known names include News International, Kiddicare, GKL Northern and Volvo. Deafblind UK and Mencap have headquarters operations in Hampton.

The 2011 UK census showed Orton with Hampton ward has the highest proportion of employed people in Peterborough. 76.6% of 16- to 74-year-olds are working.

== Local services ==
Hampton is served by a large shopping centre - Serpentine Green - which opened in 1999 and includes a Tesco Extra hypermarket, Boots, Costa Coffee, CEX, and many other High St names. It is located off the A15 road and has free parking.

== Community ==
There are currently two community centres on Hampton. The first is alongside Hargate Primary School, the second opened at Hampton Vale local centre in 2011. Other community facilities include Active Hampton, used by Hampton Football Club which has grown to have 23 separate squads for girls and boys.

== Environment ==
Hampton has been cited by Natural England as an exemplar of how to integrate new development into the surrounding landscape. Its master developers, O&H Properties, have maintained their pledge to provide at least 50% open space, and have planted around 110,000 trees.

Charities Froglife, The Wildlife Trust and Buglife, are involved in the design of the open space, including Hampton Nature Reserve which is designated a Site of Special Scientific Interest. The reserve is home to Europe's largest population of Great Crested Newts and is managed by the charity Froglife. It is notable not only for its amphibian population but at least 27 butterfly species, 18 species of dragonfly and 120 of water beetles.

The three miles of cycleway through the southern section of Hampton are part of Peterborough's 50-mile Green Wheel route encircling the city.

== Arts ==
A £50,000 sculpture competition resulted in David Nash (artist) OBE RA being commissioned to create a five-piece work, The Noon Vessel, for the courtyard of Hampton College, creating shadows as the sun moves around.

== History ==
The township is being developed on the site of former brick fields. The Ancient Romans were the first to work the Oxford clay in this area, and by the twentieth century the town was one of the UK's most important producers of bricks. Bricks from this area were known as "flettons" after the town; the term later became a little more generic.
