= Serpentine Green =

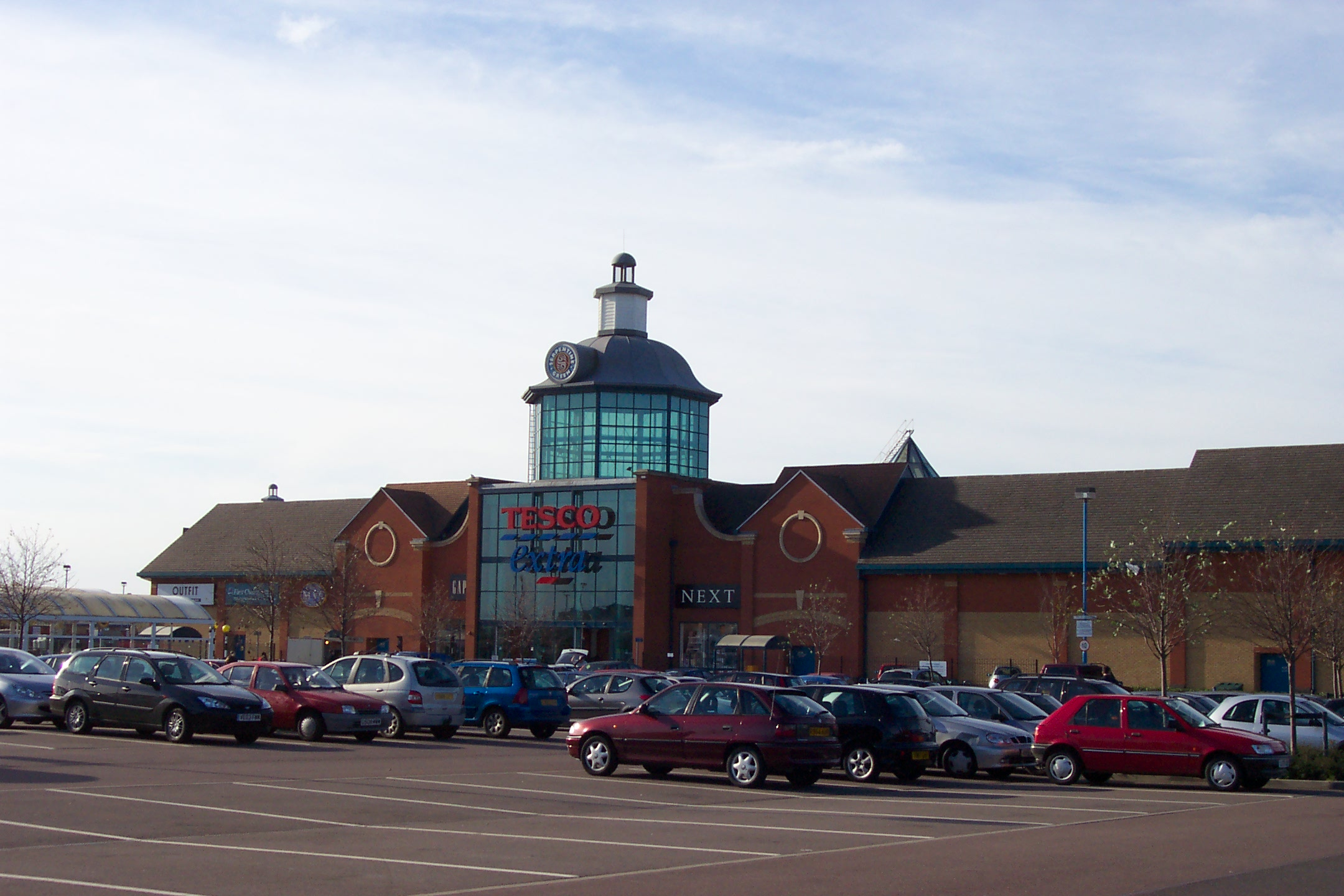
- Serpentine Green shopping centre's south entrance
- Location: Hampton, Peterborough, England
- Coordinates: 52.540213°N 0.263090°W
- Opened: 1998; 28 years ago
- Manager: Broadgate Estates LTD.
- Owner: British Land
- Num. of stores: 34
- Floor area: 208,000 square feet (19,300 m^{2})
- Floors: 1
- Website: serpentine-green.com

Serpentine Green is a shopping centre that opened 8 February 1999 in the Hampton Hargate district of Southern Peterborough in England.

It is named after the nearby Serpentine Lake and the adjoining dual-carrigeway outside the centre "The Serpentine".

When it was built the Tesco outlet was a flagship branch, and the largest store in the UK, with a floor space of 130,000 square feet (12,000 m^{2}), though larger stores have since been built. The centre comprises 34 shop units including branches of Next, M&S Food, Boots as well as many branches of other national retailers.

The centre also houses a food court and health centre/library in the Rotunda. A 2,100 space car park is provided for the large numbers of visitors the centre receives, especially in the run-up to Christmas.

The centre is situated off the A15 road from the A1139, Fletton Parkway, that skirts the south of Peterborough and runs between the centre and the Orton district of the city to the North.

On 5 May 2011, the centre saw the opening of a new Mothercare store.

In November 2016, Serpentine Green commenced its first major redevelopment of the centre adding 2,300 m^{2} (25,000 sq. ft.) of space including a new mezzanine floor and outdoor seating area. Work is expected to finish in Summer 2017. In 2019, Mothercare and WHSmith were closed and new shops will be coming soon.

== Management ==
The shopping centre is owned by British Land.

== History ==
The building is constructed on disused brick workings, from which the bricks known as flettons were made. The land was reclaimed, commencing in the 1960s, by building bunds of discarded and borrow clay, and infilling with a pulverised fuel ash slurry.

Following redevelopment in 2018, there were reports that the shopping centre smelt strongly of sewage.
