= Robert Adderley =

Dean of Ardfert

Robert Archibald Adderley (1870–1946) was Dean of Ardfert from 1938 until his death.

Adderley was educated at Trinity College, Dublin and ordained in 1903. After a curacy at St Mary's Cathedral, Tuam he was the vicar choral at St Mary's Cathedral, Limerick. during World War I he was a chaplain to the Forces. He was Rector of Listowel from 1918; of Killehenny from 1922; and Brosna from 1928.
