= Kiddicare =

- Company type: In-name Subsidiary
- Industry: Retail
- Founded: 1974
- Defunct: 2019
- Headquarters: Club Way, Cygnet Park, Hampton, Peterborough
- Key people: Marilyn and Neville Wright (Founders); Chris Yates (CEO)
- Owner: Dunelm Group
- Parent: WorldStores
- Website: www.kiddicare.com [Closed]

Kiddicare was a British multichannel retailer, selling nursery supplies and merchandise for children and young families. Founded and owned by Marilyn and Neville Wright, it was the largest privately owned online retailer of its kind, until its acquisition by Morrisons in 2011. On 14 July 2014, it was sold to Endless LLP for £2 million.

In 2016, Kiddicare and its parent Worldstores were purchased by the British homeware retailer Dunelm Group.

In 2018, after suffering millions of pounds of losses while attempting to integrate the Kiddicare business into Dunelm's legacy supply chain operation, the brand was closed.

March 2019 saw the closure of the final store in Peterborough heralding the end of an era for the Kiddicare brand started by Neville and Marilyn Wright back in 1974.

== History ==
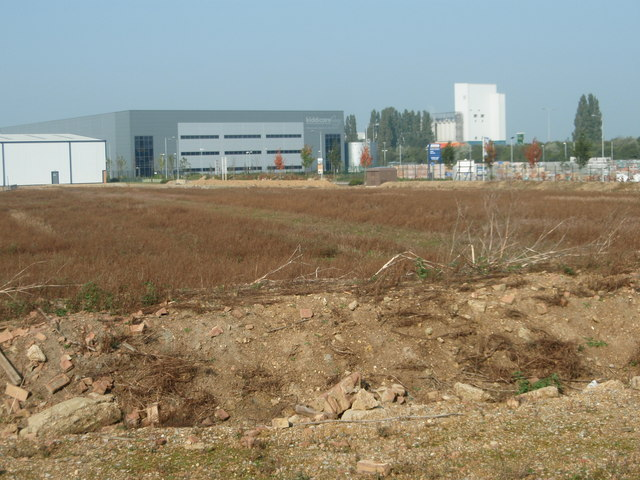
Kiddicare warehouse in Hampton, Peterborough

Kiddicare was founded in 1974 by Neville and Marilyn Wright in Bourges Bvd, New England, Peterborough. The couple then moved their business to a shop in the Orton Centre, Peterborough in the mid 1980s by which time the couple were joined by daughter Elaine Wright. The business expansion continued with the acquisition of a former Co-op supermarket in Werrington Village where second daughter Joanne Wright joined the fast expanding family business which was growing from strength to strength to the point where a much larger premises was needed for the continued expansion of their very successful business and in 2001 a further retail & distribution centre was opened in Lincoln Rd, Peterborough

The first website was developed by Barrie Ainsworth who had been hired by Neville & Marilyn to help with receiving of goods into the warehouse, it soon became apparent Barrie was computer savvy and he went about bringing together Neville's vision that the future lay in selling on the internet. An early adopter of technology, Kiddicare was one of the first UK Ecommerce websites and continued to develop the website with award-winning technology.

The website Kiddicare has been cited as "one of the biggest online retailers of kids products", having invested heavily in their online presence.

In 2007, Kiddicare moved to its current location in Parkway, Hampton, increasing the size and scale of its operations and opening their flagship store.

In 2011 the company was acquired by Morrisons for £70 million. This decision was primarily made to support the launch of Morrisons.com using the award-winning Kiddicare.com technology platform. Morrisons would also support Kiddicare with its growth as a multichannel business.

In 2011 Neville & Marilyn made the decision to sell their Kiddicare business for £70 million to Wm Morrison & family member Scott Weavers-Wright was appointed MD of Morrisons.com General Merchandise alongside his role as CEO of Kiddicare. Weavers-Wright led the creation of Morrisons first Ecommerce Website, Morrisons Cellar. The site was created from concept to launch in 12 weeks using the Kiddicare.com technology platform.up

Before 2012, Kiddicare mainly operated online, which accounted for approximately 80% of the company's business, with the rest coming through the store in Peterborough. Morrisons invested £15 million after the acquisition in converting 10 former Best Buy stores into new Kiddicare locations across the country.

On 1 April 2013, Scott Weavers-Wright left the business to launch Haatch. Morrisons Non Executive Director Nigel Robertson replaced Weavers-Wright as CEO.

On 13 March 2014, Morrisons announced plans to sell non-core activities, including Kiddicare.

On 14 July 2014, Kiddicare was sold to Endless LLP for £2m and Chris Yates was announced as Nigel Robertsons replacement as CEO.

On 28 November 2016, the company and its parent WorldStores was bought for £8.5 million by Dunelm Group.

In July 2018 Dunelm Group took the decision to close the Kiddicare website and transfer the existing 20,000 product lines from Kiddicare and Worldstores to the Dunelm website which should be completed over the course of the 2019 financial year.

March 2019 saw the closure of the final store in Peterborough.

== Awards ==
Revolution Technology award – Best UK Search

Retail Systems Award – Best UK Kiosks

Retail Week Technology Award – Best UK Kiosk Initiative

Retail Week Technology Award – Best UK Multichannel Business

Retail Systems Award – Best UK Multichannel Business

Retail Systems Award – Company Of The year

IMRG Awards for Excellence – Best Customer Experience

European Call Centre – Best European Customer Service

Online Retail Awards – Retail Mobile Website of the year

Snow Valley Golden Chariot Awards – Best UK Delivery Service

Which – 7th Best Online Shop
