= Iqra Institute for Higher Education =

- اقرأ للتعليم العالي
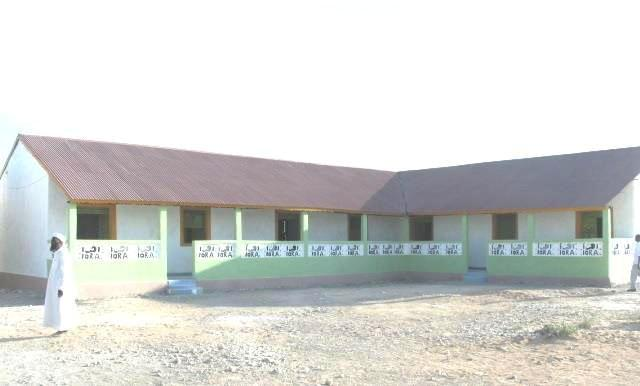
- Motto in English: Baro saad u noolaatid
- Established: 2008
- Endowment: $ 21,230
- Chancellor: Prof Abdurashid Sheikh Salah
- Administrative staff: 17
- Location: Badhan, Somaliland
- Campus: Urban and suburban

Iqra Institute for Higher Education is a Somali institute for higher education situated in the town of Badhan, in the Sanaag region of Somaliland. The institute was established in 2008 on the basis of providing opportunities for destitute youth in the region of Sanaag, focusing on vocational courses and other short courses in Management and languages, for its students to reduce poverty, and develop educated individuals who, in return, will help the community with their struggle against poverty.

== Overview ==
The Sanaag (Maakhir) region has been subjected to a prolonged lack of any higher educational entity, possibly as a result of the long and devastating Somali civil war, which have had multiple impacts on the local youth, and devastating effects on career developments and the possibility of youth receiving sustainable income.

Youths have become destitute in high numbers. Harsh socio-economic conditions and lack of higher education have, in turn, escalated their poverty and increased the likelihood of the youths immigrating to other regions of Somaliland to seek further education. The area is huge and lacks basic community institutions in surrounding towns or cities.

The institute offers different types of courses and vocational skill lessons on its main campus in Badhan. The institute has joined the Union of Somali institutes, a consortium of Somalia's institutes.

== Gallery ==
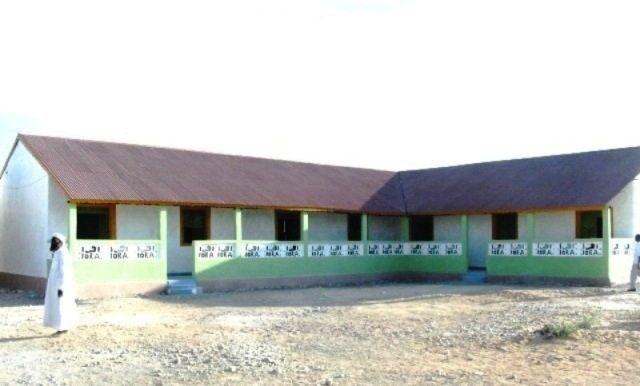

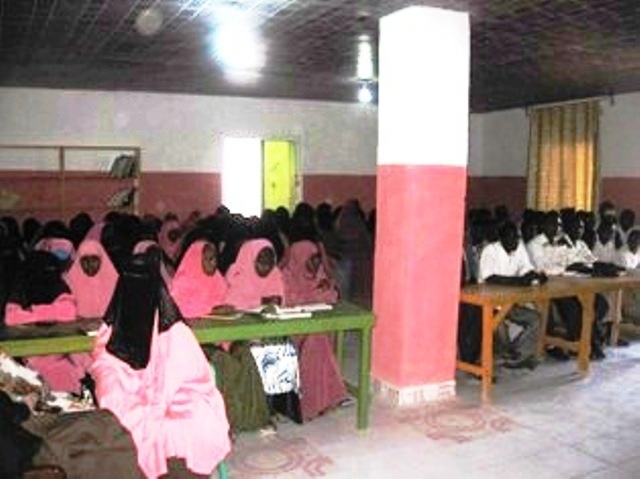

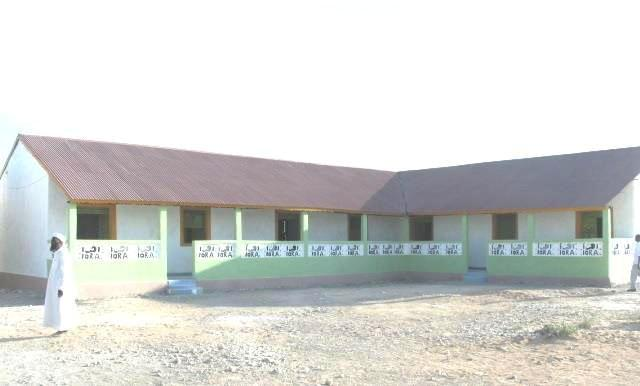

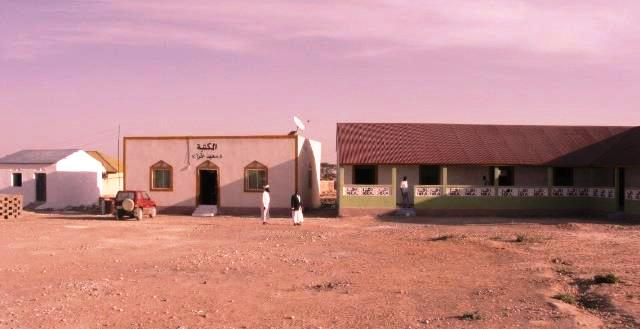
