= Janet Gulland =

Aeronautical engineer, first female graduate apprentice at Vickers Armstrongs

Janet Gulland FRAeS MA CEng
- Born: 18 July 1934; Berkhamsted, UK
- Died: September 2017 (aged 83)
- Education: Lady Margaret Hall, Oxford; Brown University
- Engineering career
- Discipline: aeronautical engineering
- Employer: Vickers-Armstrongs
- Projects: BAC TSR-2

Janet Mary Gulland FRAeS MA CEng (18 July 1934 – 23 September 2017) was a British aeronautical engineer and the first female graduate engineering apprentice at Vickers-Armstrongs.

== Education ==
Gulland attended Berkhamsted Girls School and then went to Lady Margaret Hall at the University of Oxford in 1953. There she intended to study mathematics but changed to engineering science, being the only woman in her year.

In 1956, while at Oxford University, she won a Fulbright Scholarship as a research assistant in engineering at Brown University, Rhode Island, US. In 1958 she became the first woman to join Vickers-Armstrongs as a graduate engineering apprentice and completed her apprenticeship in 1960.

== Career ==
Gulland then took up a position in Vickers-Armstrongs' Aerodynamics Department, where she was involved in wind tunnel studies. During the 1960s she was also an Operational Researcher monitoring the performance of the TSR-2, a strike and reconnaissance aircraft developed by the British Aircraft Corporation (BAC) for the Royal Air Force, and provided technical support and marketing intelligence to the sales team. In her early career she flew on several test flights including for the Vickers VC10 and Valiant V-bomber aircraft.

By 1976 she had become a Research Engineer in the Group Research Department at the headquarters of BAC headquarters in Weybridge, Surrey. She was later involved, eventually at management level, in coordinating and monitoring research and was responsible for overall market research and forecasts. At the end of her career she was Director - Market Research for British Aerospace Defence Marketing, where her work involved market research on military derivatives of commercial aircraft, and where she oversaw a team of analysts, intelligence officers and forecasters.

She was Chairman of the Weybridge branch of the Royal Aeronautical Society from 1989 to 2006, and was elected a Fellow of the Society in October 1994.

== Personal life and interests ==
Gulland had many interests outside her career, including sailing, skiing and Scottish dancing. She also enjoyed opera, concerts, theatre and exhibitions and travelled extensively with Sue, her partner for nearly 50 years.

== Archive ==
Her extensive collection of documents and photographs, recording her own career and evidencing her support for encouraging more women into engineering, was donated by Sue to Brooklands Museum.
