= Werrington, Peterborough =

Area of Peterborough, England

Coordinates: 52.6239°N 0.2789°W

Werrington
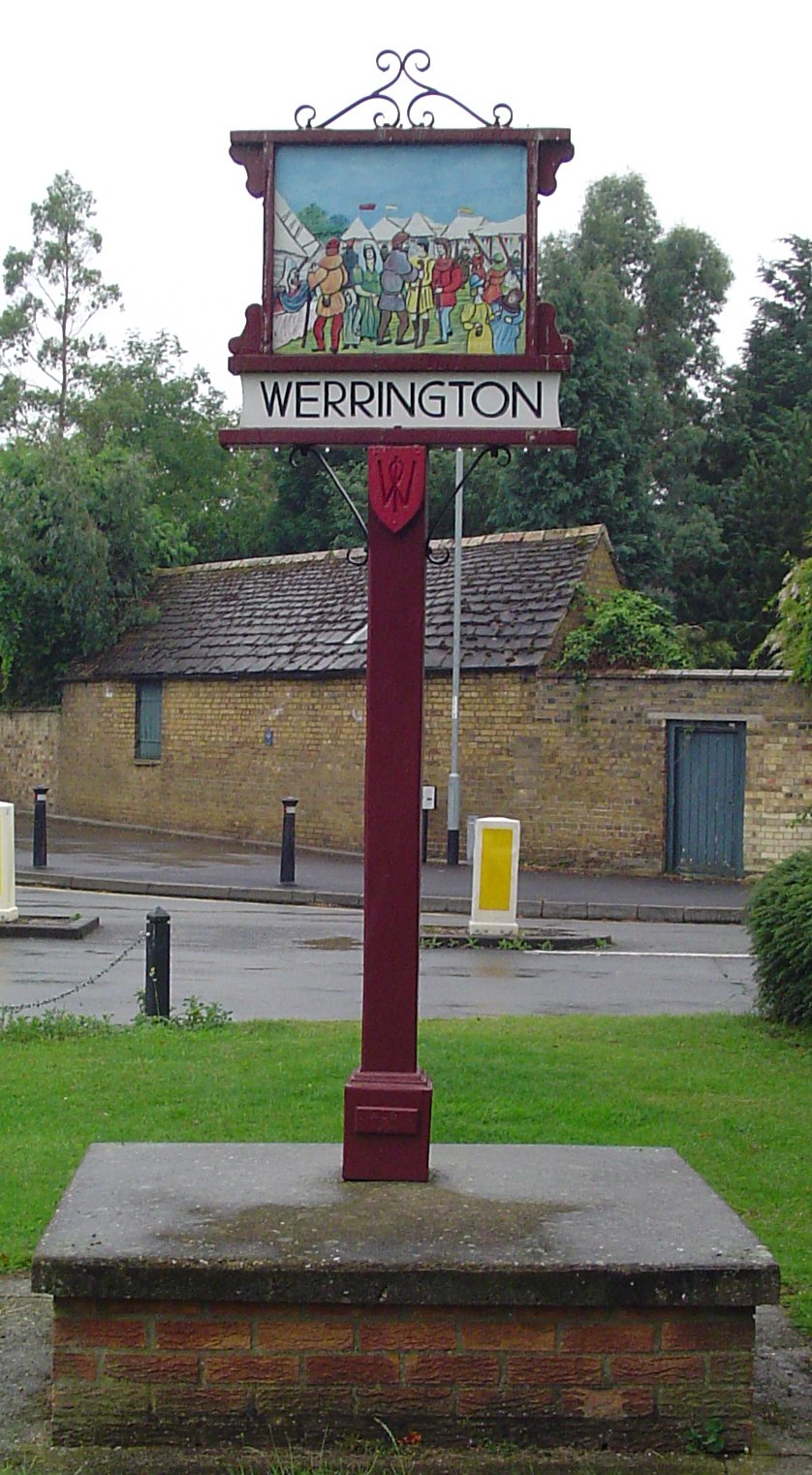
- Village sign in Werrington

- Location within Cambridgeshire
- Unitary authority: Peterborough
- Shire county: Cambridgeshire
- Region: East
- Country: England
- Sovereign state: United Kingdom
- Post town: PETERBOROUGH
- Postcode district: PE4
- Dialling code: 01733

Werrington is a residential area of the city of Peterborough, in the ceremonial county of Cambridgeshire, England. For electoral purposes it comprises North Werrington and South Werrington wards. Werrington spans an area of two and a half square miles (6 km^{2}) and has a population of 14,800.

Originally a village, Werrington was engulfed by Peterborough in the mid 20th century, as the city expanded. The area is on the northern edge of the conurbation, approximately four miles (6.4 km) from the city centre. There are two distinct areas of Werrington, the village and new Werrington. The village dates from older periods and focuses on the village green. The new Werrington area focuses on the Werrington Centre, a small shopping complex featuring stores for basic needs.

== Civil parish ==
Werrington became a parish in 1866. In 1921 the parish had a population of 807. Werrington parish was abolished and merged with Peterborough on 1 April 1929.

== Shopping ==
Werrington Centre shops include Tesco, Age Concern and other small shops. These shops have undergone change since 2004 as a result of bigger companies buying out the locally owned shops.

The development of Werrington continues, with new residential accommodation in the northernmost part of the area. The shopping centre redevelopment has now been abandoned by Tesco with many small units available for rent or are boarded up.

== Activities ==
Werrington has held a summer carnival and bonfire and fireworks display every year since the 1970s. At the bonfire, two people made out of clay are set on fire, made by volunteers from the local Scout and Guide Association in conjunction with Werrington Primary School.

Werrington Village Cricket Club plays in the local Huntingdonshire leagues throughout the summer and plays its home games at nearby Campbell Drive sports fields. Werrington Badminton Club has 100 members ranging from beginners up to county level who play in tournaments around the city and county. They also run two men's and a mixed team in the Hunts league.

== Local schools ==
New Werrington contains three schools. William Law and Welbourne are both primary schools. Ken Stimpson Academy is the only secondary school in the area.

Ken Stimpson Academy is a public secondary school which opened in 1982. The school has about 1,100 pupils from years 7 to post-16 (Years 12/13). The school acquired Business and Enterprise College Specialist school status in late 2004.

Werrington Primary School is the only school in the original village. It is in the top five for most rankings for primary schools in Peterborough. The school was founded at the end of the 19th century on the site of what is now the village centre as a Church of England school. The junior school moved to its current site in 1961, followed by the infant school in 1966. The junior and infant schools have merged and share a common administration. William Law C of E Primary School and Welbourne Primary School are the two primary schools that are not in Werrington village.
