= Hampton College, Peterborough =

Hampton College

Location
- Eagle Way; Hampton Vale; Peterborough, Cambridgeshire, PE7 8BF; England; 52.5347°N 0.2649°W

Information
- Type: Academy
- Established: 2005
- Local authority: Peterborough
- Department for Education URN: 141300 Tables
- Ofsted: Reports
- Head Teacher: Alex Ford
- Gender: Coeducational
- Age: 4 to 18
- Website: hamptoncollege.org.uk

Hampton College is an all-through school for children aged 4 to 18, in Hampton, Peterborough, England.

The school opened to years 7 and 8 in September 2005. By 2008 the school accepted students in years 7 through to 11. Further expansion, including a sixth form, was initially due for completion by 2010. Although the school began AS Level courses in September 2009, the date for the new buildings was reviewed. Phase 2 of the school building programme started 2011. In 2016 the sister school Hampton Gardens was built along with a 3G Astro turf football field. The Hampton Academies Trust was also set up, led by Hampton College's former headteacher, Helen Price.

Hampton College and Hampton Gardens operate under a joint Sixth Form community with students learning in both schools. Hampton Gardens teaches performing arts and dance classes whilst Hampton College teaches humanities. A third school, Hampton Lakes, is planned to be built in 2021 to complete the Hampton Academies Trust.

The school has an outdoor amphitheatre and is built around a courtyard setting. In the evenings, the school is used for a variety of groups and adult education classes.

The college was found to be 'outstanding' by Ofsted in 2007, and was rated as 'outstanding' in 6 out of a possible 7 categories, putting it in the top 2% of schools nationally. A further Ofsted inspection in July 2010 again judged the school to be 'outstanding'; however, since 2017, Ofsted have lowered the school's rating to 'good'.

== Primary school provision ==
In 2010, Peterborough City Council approached the college to run a new primary school in Hampton, as it was the Council's preference for the operation of the primary school to come under the control of Hampton College. At the time the college was facing a change in headteacher and there were uncertainties over the phase 2 extension. Both of these issues were resolved and in April 2012(?) Hampton College governing body agreed to take on the running of the primary school from 2013; the Council formally announced the expansion in July 2012.

The new primary school will be built on the community playing field land (due to transfer to the city council) adjacent to the site of Hampton College which is leased by the city council. Playing fields will be retained and enhanced with changing rooms, storage and other sports and library facilities. Planning permission was granted for the development by the planning committee on 22 November 2011.

The school opened its primary provision in September 2012 at nearby Hampton Hargate Primary School. The primary phase relocated to the new Hampton College school buildings in September 2013.
