= Iqra Academy =

Location
- Enterprise Way; Peterborough, Cambridgeshire, PE3 8YQ; England; 52.60045°N 0.27311°W

Information
- Type: Private school
- Religious affiliation: Islam
- Established: 2009
- Local authority: Peterborough City Council
- Department for Education URN: 136023 Tables
- Ofsted: Reports
- Principal: Michael Wright
- Gender: Girls
- Age: 11 to 16
- Enrolment: 93
- Website: http://www.iqraacademy.org.uk/

The Iqra Academy is a girls-only independent school opened in 2009 in Peterborough, England. It is based around Islamic principles, however accepts both Muslim and non-Muslim students.
