= Stanground Academy =

Academy in Peterborough, Cambridgeshire, England

Location
- Peterborough Road, Peterborough,, Cambridgeshire,, PE7 3BY; United Kingdom; 52.548843°N 0.226688°W

Information
- Type: Academy
- Motto: "Be Inspired"
- Established: 1966
- Local authority: Peterborough
- Trust: Greenwood Academy Trust
- Department for Education URN: 137880 Tables
- Gender: Mixed
- Age: 11 to 19
- Enrolment: 1322

Stanground Academy is a co-educational academy school and specialist college for sport, in the city of Peterborough in the United Kingdom. As of 20 October 2023, the academy has a capacity of around 1,430 students, with more people joining.

The school was established in 1966 as Stanground Secondary Modern School, becoming comprehensive when education in the county was reorganised in 1976. It was officially opened by Alderman Dr. Jack Hunt, chairman of the Education Committee of the then Huntingdon and Peterborough County Council, after whom another local school is named.

It has had specialist status as a sports college since 2001 and in 2012, it became an academy when it was handed over by Peterborough City Council to the Greenwood Dale Foundation Trust in order to improve the school as it was remarkably behind the national average in most aspects of education and learning.

Stanground Academy was finally rebuilt in September 2013 with the original school making way for demolition. This was beneficial in terms of the facilities available to students at the school, and has also solved the many maintenance issues with the former building which had led to the school being closed to students on several occasions in the past due to dangerous conditions for a communal building.

Facilities at the school include a pool open for public swimming and a fitness suite/gym which is also open to the public during term time as well as in the half term breaks.

Most students are of British or Italian heritage and the majority have English as their first language. However, an increasing number of students are joining the academy having recently arrived in the United Kingdom. Over 15% of students are now from Eastern Europe and many speak little or no English. The proportion of students with learning difficulties or disabilities is above the national average and the economic backgrounds of students are broadly in line with the national average.

In conjunction to this, the last Ofsted report filed the school as "good". It has recently claimed to be one of the most improved schools in the United Kingdom. According to multiple reports, it is said that since the new principal, Mr Van Lier, the schools has all around improved.
