= Charles Adderley (cricketer) =

English cricketer

Cricket information
- Batting: Right-handed
- Bowling: Right-arm medium-pace

Career statistics
Competition	First-class
Matches	5
Runs scored	27
Batting average	4.50
100s/50s	0/0
Top score	12
Balls bowled	499
Wickets	4
Bowling average	63.75
5 wickets in innings	0
10 wickets in match	0
Best bowling	1/19
Catches/stumpings	1/–
- Source: , 6 January 2013

Charles Henry Adderley (16 September 1912 – 28 February 1985) was an English first-class cricketer. He was a right-handed batsman and a right-arm medium-pace bowler who played for Warwickshire. He was born in King's Heath, Birmingham and died in Moseley.

Adderley represented Warwickshire during the 1946 season, though he failed to impress with either bat or ball, scoring just 27 runs in five first-class matches.

Adderley had played for the National Fire Service in 1944 and 1945.
