= William Adderley (MP) =

English politician

William Adderley (fl. 1369–1403) was an English politician. He sat as MP for Derbyshire in April 1384, 1385, February 1388, and November 1390.

He also served as commissioner to suppress the insurgents of 1381 in Derbyshire in December 1381 and March 1382, commissioner of inquiry in Nottinghamshire concerning disorder at Trowell, commissioner to make arrests in Nottinghamshire and Derbyshire in February 1384, commissioner of array at Derbyshire in March 1392, December 1399 and September 1403, justice of the peace of Derbyshire from 14 April 1386 till December 1387 and 24 December 1390 till November 1399.

By December 1400, he was married to a woman called Elizabeth.
