= Bill Adderley =

British billionaire businessman

Sir Bill Adderley
- Born: William Adderley; February 1948 (age 78); Leeds, Yorkshire, England
- Occupation: Businessman
- Known for: Founder of the Dunelm Group home furnishings retailer
- Spouse: Jean Adderley
- Children: 2

William Adderley (born February 1948) is a British businessman and founder of the FTSE 250-listed Dunelm Group home furnishings retailer.

== Early life ==
Adderley was born on a council estate in February 1948 in Leeds, Yorkshire. Adderley left school at 16, with a basic education level. He was a boyhood fan of Leeds United.

== Career ==
Adderley was a manager at a Woolworths store in Coalville, but left in 1979 after the company wanted him to relocate to its Skegness store.

In 1979, while looking for a new job, Adderley and his wife, Jean, sold curtains which had been rejected by Marks and Spencer from a stall on Leicester market. In 1984, they opened their first home furnishings store, calling it Dunelm Mill. He retired from Dunelm at the age of 58 in 2006 and left the growth of the company in the hands of his son, Sir William (“Will”) Adderley, and it was at this time the company floated.

In October 2013, The Guardian commented that Adderley had become the largest private shareholder in Marks & Spencer, having built a stake valued at £250 million.

Adderley sold most of his stake in Marks & Spencer and bought a stake in Morrisons in 2017.

Currently, Dunelm operates in 180 stores across the UK and runs an ecommerce business. The Adderley family still owns approximately 43% of the shares.

== Wealth ==
In 2022, the Sunday Times Rich List estimated his net worth at £1.78 billion.

== Personal life ==
He and his wife Jean have two children: Will is a director and deputy chairman of Dunelm Group plc, while Jonathan, is not actively involved in the business.

In February 2026, Bill was listed on the Sunday Times Tax list with an estimated £51.5 million.
