= Stanground Newt Ponds =

Nature reserve in the United Kingdom

Coordinates: 52.549°N 0.229°W

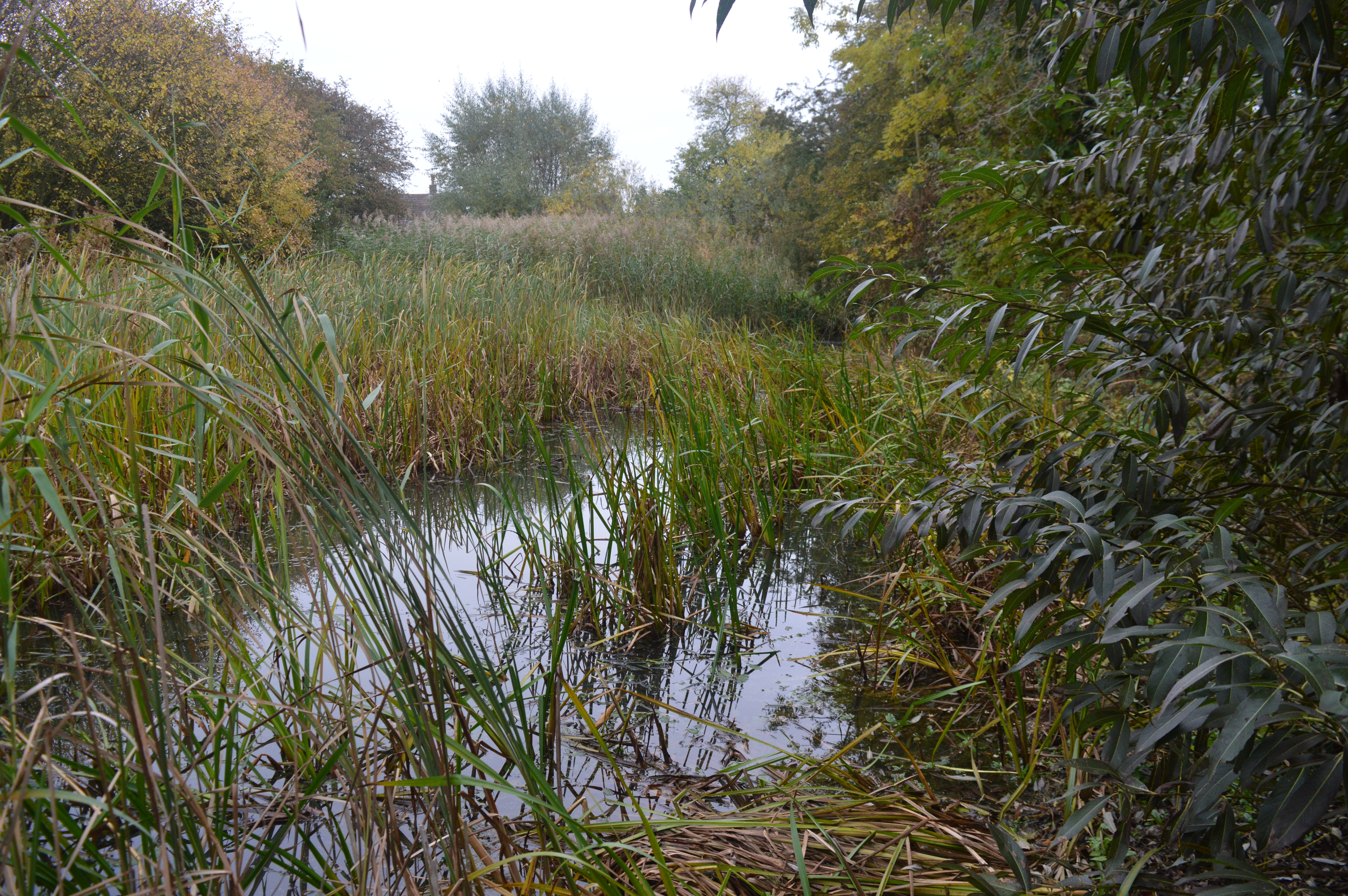
- Interactive map of Stanground Newt Ponds
- Type: Nature reserve
- Location: Peterborough, Cambridgeshire
- OS grid: TL 202 961
- Area: 1 hectare (2.5 acres)
- Manager: Wildlife Trust for Bedfordshire, Cambridgeshire and Northamptonshire

Stanground Newt Ponds is a 1-hectare (2.5-acre) nature reserve in Peterborough in Cambridgeshire. It is managed by the Wildlife Trust for Bedfordshire, Cambridgeshire and Northamptonshire. The land was originally set aside during the building process of housing, while the ponds themselves have existed for decades.

This site has ponds and a wet meadow, with smooth and great crested newts. Other fauna include common frogs, damselflies and dragonflies. The area is bordered by a meadow. It has been a location for research on local newts, their reproduction, and their larvae.

There is access from Hoylake Drive, which bisects the site.
