= Daphne Jackson Trust =

Independent UK charity

- Founded: 1992
- Founder: Daphne Jackson
- Location: University of Surrey Guildford, Surrey, England
- Region served: UK
- Key people: Katie Perry (Chief Executive) Professor Tom Welton OBE FRSC FCGI (Chair of Trustees)
- Website: daphnejackson.org

The Daphne Jackson Trust is an independent UK charity based in the Maths & Physics Department at the University of Surrey.

It was established in 1992 to help people restart their careers in research. The Daphne Jackson Trust supports funded, part-time Fellowships, usually held over two-three years, to be hosted at UK Universities or research institutions. Fellowships are unique and tailored to undertake a supervised research project with a retraining programme. The Trust's work is highly praised by Government and the charity is acknowledged as the only charity in the UK that works with returners across all areas of research and technical professions. The Trust's Fellowship scheme has been recognised as an exemplar model for research returner Fellowships.

Daphne Jackson Fellowships have saved 2,412 years of training and experience securing more than £87 million in research funding and producing over 2,200 peer-reviewed publications. The Trust has supported over 500 researchers back to their careers and saved over 2,400 years and almost £80 million of research training, experience and talent from being lost from the sector. https://daphnejackson.org/fellows/impact-and-outcomes/

== History ==
The Fellowship scheme was started by Daphne Jackson, the first female professor of physics in the UK. Over the course of her career she met many clever and highly qualified scientists who were reduced to taking low-level jobs because they had taken a career break. Drawing attention to this frustrating situation, Jackson observed, "Imagine a society that would allow Marie Curie to stack shelves in a supermarket simply because she took a career break for family reasons." Deciding that this was a waste of talent and investment, in 1985 she began a pilot scheme that enabled women to return to their careers.

The pilot scheme enabled talented women to return to their careers in science, engineering and technology (SET) after a break by offering Fellowships composed of a retraining programme linked to a challenging research or development project, with the overall focus put firmly on improving future employment potential of the individual. The key objective was that the Fellowship should help re-establish professional expertise as well as personal confidence, within an appropriately supportive environment, with significantly improved job prospects at the end. A total of 27 fellows successfully completed fellowships during the pilot scheme, which ran during the late 1980s.

Jackson left a legacy after her death in 1991 which enabled the Daphne Jackson Trust to be established in 1992. The physicist Elizabeth (Betty) Johnson was a major force in the establishment of the Daphne Jackson Trust. Johnson had been one of the first Daphne Jackson Fellows in 1986 at Imperial College London. Betty Johnson was appointed a MBE in the Queen's Birthday Honours list of 2002 in recognition of this work.

The Trust named its 100th fellow in 2002 and has gone on to work with many more returners. The Trust took its first male fellow in 2003, and now works with both men and women. In 2016 the Trust celebrated thirty years of Daphne Jackson Fellowships.

In 2020, the Trust expanded remit into Art & Humanities research, making fellowship available to all researchers in all disciplines. In 2021 a New Research Technical Professional Fellowships piloted for professionals returning to careers with more technical and skills specialisms. In 2024 the Trust held its biggest conference yet: "Your Research, Your way" and its 500th Fellowship was awarded.

== Governance and administration ==
The charity's Chief Executive is Katie Perry.

A board of Trustees governs the Daphne Jackson Trust.

The Daphne Jackson Trust holds a Research Conference every two years, and since 2023 a Fellow's Day every other year.

The Patrons of the Daphne Jackson Trust are: Dame Athene Donald DBE, Vivienne Parry OBE, Maggie Philbin OBE and Professor Jim Al-Khalili CBE FRS.

The Daphne Jackson Trust was established as a Charity in 1992, Charity Number 1009605. The Trust was incorporated as a Company Limited by Guarantee in 2008. The Charity Number was changed and its new status became effective from 1 December 2008.

Registered by the Charity Commission as the Daphne Jackson Memorial Fellowships Trust with Charity Number 1125867.

== Funders ==
The Daphne Jackson Trust's funders and hosts include universities, research councils, learned societies/professional institutions, industry and charities. In March 2026, announced by the Science Secretary, Department for Science, Innovation & Technology in the current spending review period from 2026 onwards. The Government will more than double support for the Daphne Jackson Trust from £1.7m to £4m per year, which will help to unlock the talent of many more researchers whose careers have been paused.
