= Ken Stimpson Academy =

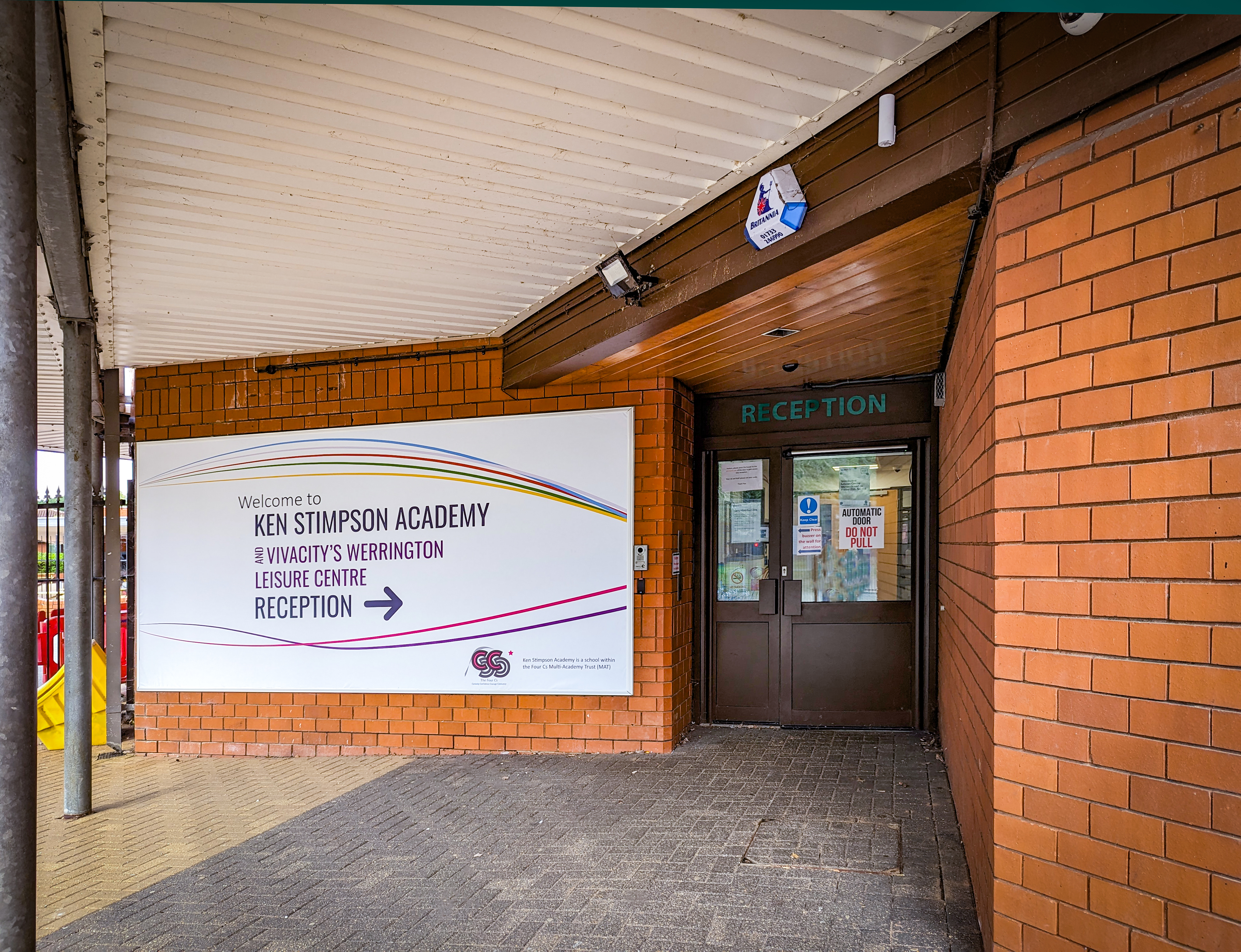

Location
- Staniland Way; Peterborough, Cambridgeshire, PE4 6JT; England; 52.619525°N 0.275982586°W

Information
- Type: Academy
- Motto: Ready. Responsible. Respectful. Resilient.
- Established: 1982 (As Ken Stimpson Community School) 2023 (As Ken Stimpson Academy)
- Local authority: Peterborough
- Trust: Four Cs MAT
- Department for Education URN: 149236 Tables
- Ofsted: Reports
- Chair of Governors: Angus Brown
- HeadTeacher: Damien Whales
- Gender: Mixed
- Age: 11 to 19
- Enrolment: 1080
- Houses: Aspire, Excellence, Integrity, Success,
- Colours: Red, Yellow, Blue, Green
- Website: www.kenstimpson.org.uk

Ken Stimpson Academy is a co-educational secondary school and sixth form in Peterborough in the English county of Cambridgeshire.

== History ==
Ken Stimpson Academy was founded as Ken Stimpson Community School in 1982, it was a tribute to Kenneth. W. Stimpson who was the Senior Area Education Officer between 1974 and 1979.

The school closed as a Community School in August 2023 and reopened as Ken Stimpson Academy as part of the Four Cs multi-academy trust in September 2023.

== Community ==
Ken Stimpson Academy shares its site with a sports centre (which has a gym and a sports hall) and is home to the Werrington Library.

== Subjects ==
The subjects that are taught at Ken Stimpson are:

- Art
- Business Studies
- Careers
- Computing
- Design And Technology
- English
- Humanities
- Modern Foreign Languages
- Mathematics
- Physical Education
- Performing Arts
- Science
- Social Sciences (Child Development, Health and Social Care, Psychology)

== E-Safety Mark ==
In June 2015, Ken Stimpson received the 360 Degree Safe E-Safety mark by the South West Grid for Learning and was the first school in Peterborough to get this certification. According to the Accreditation 360 Degree Safe website, this demonstrates that the school shows good practice in their e-safety policies and procedures.

== Ofsted Inspection ==
The school has not been inspected since it became an academy in 2023.

The final inspection of the academy's forerunner, the Ken Stimpson Community School, was in October 2022 and rated the school as Requires Improvement.
