= Nene Park Academy =

Nene Park Academy (NPA)

Location
- Oundle Road; Peterborough, Cambridgeshire, PE2 7EA; England

Information
- Former names: Orton Longeville School; Orton Longeville Grammar
- Type: Academy
- Motto: Here to achieve
- Established: 1959 (as a grammar school) 1961 (as a comprehensive school) 2011 (as an academy)
- Local authority: Peterborough
- Specialist: Business & Enterprise
- Department for Education URN: 137082 Tables
- Ofsted: Reports
- Headteacher: Rob Grover
- Gender: Coeducational
- Age: 11 to 19
- Enrolment: 1077
- Colours: Black and Blue/Green/Red/Yellow/Orange
- Website: www.neneparkacademy.org

Nene Park Academy (formerly Orton Longueville School) is a secondary academy school in Peterborough. The school was renamed in September 2011 when it converted to an academy upon joining Cambridge Meridian Academies Trust (CMAT). A new £15 million academy building was opened by Robert Winston in February 2014. The academy's sponsorship by CMAT means it is partnered with Swavesey Village College. Nene Park Academy is also home to Peterborough United Football Club's Youth Training Academy, and a partnership has been developed with the club.

== Admissions ==
The academy provides for pupils aged 11–19 and the academy's population was just over 960 in the 2013–14 year. The academy has an admission limit of 180 for Year 7 students starting the 2014/15 academic year.

== History ==
=== Grammar school ===
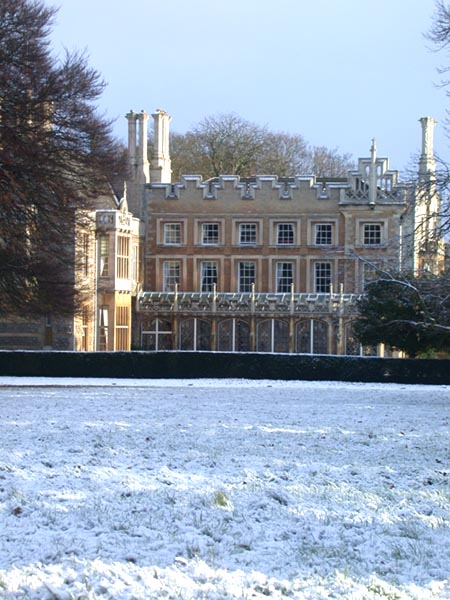
The school was built in the grounds of Orton Hall

The academy began as Orton Longueville Grammar School in 1959. This was originally Fletton Grammar School in Old Fletton (also in Huntingdonshire), which opened in 1910, and moved to the new site. It kept Fletton's motto of Onward and Upward. The former Fletton school became a primary school on London Road. The 1959 Orton school was built by Huntingdonshire County Council (not the Soke of Peterborough which then contained most of Peterborough) on the grounds of Orton Hall, owned by the Marquess of Huntly. The hall is now a Best Western hotel. The grammar school had a catchment area as far south as the Alconburys and Sawtry. It was one of three grammar schools in the former Huntingdonshire (broadly coextensive with the current district of that name).

=== Comprehensive ===
Next door to the grammar school, the Orton Longueville Secondary Modern School opened in 1961, which merged with the grammar school in September 1970. This school was originally situated in Woodston. It was administered by Huntingdon and Peterborough from 1965, Cambridgeshire County Council from April 1974, and the City of Peterborough from 1998.

=== 1989 arson attack ===
There was a fire in the early hours of Wednesday 25 October 1989, in the half-term holiday. 40 firemen, from nine fire stations, took water from the school swimming pool. The fire destroyed ten classrooms, in the art and craft block. Damage was estimated at £858,000. The headteacher was Peter Frogley. A 16 year old male was charged in May 1990.

=== Business and Enterprise college ===
In 2003 the school was selected by the Department for Education as a designated Specialist Business and Enterprise College.

=== Academy ===
On 31 August 2011 Orton Longueville School closed and reopened on 1 September 2011 as Nene Park Academy. The academy's new £15m building officially opened in February 2014, and has science laboratories, IT and digital media studios, and parkland in front of the academy, including a grass amphitheatre.

== Academic performance ==
Nene Park Academy was inspected by Ofsted in November 2013 and rated as "good" in all areas. The report stated, "Achievement is good and rapidly rising. Significant numbers of students from different ethnic backgrounds make outstanding progress", and, "Working together effectively, senior staff, governors, the Cambridge Meridian Academies' Trust and the local election authority have developed a good school in wonderful, new buildings."

== Houses ==
Nene Park Academy Houses
House	Colour	Named After
Brunel	Green	Isambard Kingdom Brunel
King	Yellow	Martin Luther King Jr.
Lennon	Blue	John Lennon
Nightingale	Purple	Florence Nightingale
Winston	Red	Robert Winston
Rowling	Orange	J. K. Rowling

== Alumni ==
=== Orton Longueville Grammar School ===
- Judy MacArthur Clark CBE, vet and Chief Inspector of the Animals (Scientific Procedures) Inspectorate since 2007, President of the Royal College of Veterinary Surgeons (RCVS) from 1992 to 1993, and Chair of the Farm Animal Welfare Council from 1999 to 2004.

=== Fletton Grammar School ===
- George Alcock MBE, astronomer
- Geoffrey Dear, Baron Dear, Chief Constable from 1985 to 1990 of West Midlands Police

=== Nene Park Academy ===
- Jaanai Gordon, footballer for Oxford City
- Leonardo Lopes, footballer for Gent
- Ricky-Jade Jones, footballer for St. Pauli
