= Lockington =

Lockington may refer to:

== Placenames ==
- Lockington, East Riding of Yorkshire, England
  - Lockington rail crash, 1986 derailment in the East Riding of Yorkshire
  - Lockington railway station, former station in the East Riding of Yorkshire
- Lockington-Hemington, Leicestershire, England
  - Lockington, Leicestershire, a village in the parish of Lockington-Hemington
- Lockington, Ohio
- Lockington, Victoria

== Surname ==
- Andrew Lockington (born 1974), Canadian film score composer
- David Lockington (born 1956), music director of the Grand Rapids Symphony
- William Neale Lockington (1840-1902), English zoologist
