= Uffington and Barnack railway station =

Former railway station in England

Coordinates: 52.6466°N 0.4171°W

Uffington and Barnack
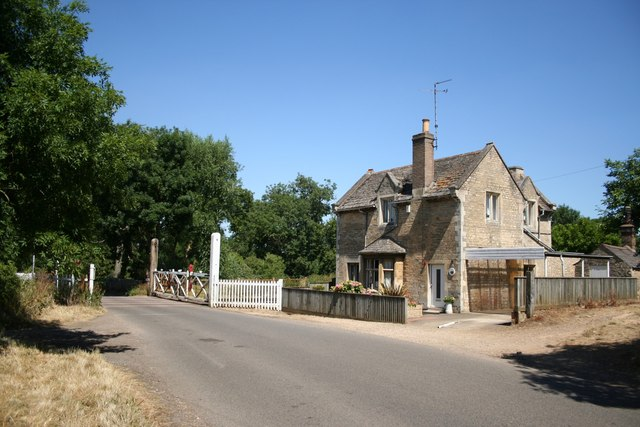
- The station house and level crossing in 2006

General information
- Location: Uffington and Pilsgate, Peterborough; England
- Grid reference: TF072065
- Platforms: 2

Other information
- Status: Disused

History
- Pre-grouping: Midland Railway
- Post-grouping: London, Midland and Scottish Railway; London Midland Region of British Railways

Key dates
- 2 October 1846: Opened as Uffington
- 1 February 1858: Renamed as Uffington and Barnack
- 1 September 1952: Closed for passengers
- 17 August 1964: closed for freight
Location

Uffington and Barnack was a railway station in the Soke of Peterborough (now Cambridgeshire) serving the villages of Uffington, Barnack and Bainton.

== History ==
The station was on the Midland Railway's Syston and Peterborough Railway from Peterborough to Leicester and was situated to the east of a level crossing on the road between Uffington and Barnack. It opened in 1846 and closed to passengers in 1952 and to goods in 1964.

To the west of the level crossing was a signal box and a single goods siding. The goods yard is now used as a car park by the signalman and sometimes by track maintenance crews. The signal box is still in use and is a block post with the adjacent signal boxes being Peterborough and Ketton, Stamford signal box having been abolished in 1983. Unusually, the level crossing gates are still opened and closed manually by the signalman.

Between 1867 and 1929, Barnack was also served by the Barnack station on the Great Northern Railway line between Stamford East and Wansford. The station was more conveniently sited, but Uffington & Barnack provided the more useful services.

There was also at one time a station on the Midland line at Bainton, called Bainton Gate, but this closed in 1856.

The station house has survived and is now a private house.

== Summary of former services ==
Preceding station	Historical railways	Following station
Stamford	Midland Railway; Leicester to Peterborough	Bainton Gate

== Sample train timetable for July 1922 ==
The table below shows the train departures from Uffington & Barnack station on weekdays in July 1922.

Departure	Going to	Calling at	Arrival	Operator
08.12	Leicester	Stamford, Ketton, Luffenham, Manton, Oakham, Ashwell, Whissendine, Saxby, Melton Mowbray, Asfordby, Frisby, Brooksby, Rearsby, Syston	19.13	MR
09.01	Peterborough East	Helpston, Walton, Peterborough North	09.33	MR
10.51	Peterborough East	Helpston, Peterborough North	11.20	MR
12.25	Leicester	Stamford, Ketton, Luffenham, Manton, Oakham, Ashwell, Whissendine, Saxby, Melton Mowbray	14.00	MR
14.38	Peterborough East	Helpston, Walton, Peterborough North	15.08	MR
15.55	Leicester	Stamford, Ketton, Luffenham, Manton, Oakham, Ashwell, Whissendine, Saxby, Melton Mowbray, Syston	17.32	MR
17.09	Peterborough East	Helpston, Walton, Peterborough North	17.37	MR
17.30	Leicester	Stamford, Ketton, Luffenham, Manton, Oakham, Saxby, Melton Mowbray, Asfordby, Frisby, Brooksby, Rearsby, Syston	19.13	MR
