= Hixon rail crash =

Fatal collision at a level crossing in 1968

- Aerial photo of crash scene from accident inquiry; south is at the top. The transporter was crossing from west to east, the train approached from the north.

Details
- Date: 6 January 1968; 12:26
- Location: Hixon, Staffordshire
- Coordinates: 52°49′48.42″N 2°0′46.55″W
- Country: England
- Line: West Coast Main Line
- Operator: British Rail
- Cause: Road vehicle obstruction

Statistics
- Trains: 1
- Vehicles: 1 (low loader transporter)
- Passengers: ~300
- Deaths: 11
- Injured: 45
- Damage: 1 locomotive, 5 carriages destroyed

On 6 January 1968, a low-loader transporter carrying a 120-ton electrical transformer was struck by a British Rail express train on a recently installed automatic level crossing at Hixon, Staffordshire, England.

The collision resulted in 11 deaths and 45 people injured, and led to improvements in signage around automatic level crossings.

== Background ==
In the 1950s, British Railways found that the cost of manning 2,400 level crossings had risen past £1 million per annum, with some locations seeing a tenfold increase. In the post-war labour market it was often difficult to recruit crossing keepers, the job itself being a responsible but rather dull occupation. In addition, manually operated crossings often caused long delays to road traffic because of the need to close the gates and clear the distant signal before the approaching train reached it.

In October 1956, senior members of Her Majesty's Railway Inspectorate (HMRI) embarked on a fact-finding trip to the Netherlands, Belgium and France to investigate the practice of automating level crossings. Their subsequent report recommended the introduction of automatically operated crossings with half-barriers, known as AHBs. This was projected to give considerable cost savings through the withdrawal of crossing keepers and would also speed up the flow of road traffic; the crossing being closed for less than a minute as opposed to 3 or 4 minutes at staffed crossings.

We consider that some of the Continental methods of operating level crossings will prove suitable for adoption in Great Britain without prejudice to safety ... also, automatic and remote operation might be adopted at selected crossings after satisfactory trials.

Safety requirements were drawn up in 1957, but it was not until 1961 that the first automatic crossing in Britain was installed at Spath, near Uttoxeter. The crossing was designed to give a minimum of 24 seconds warning for the fastest train on that line.

By January 1968 there were 207 automatic crossings in Britain including the one at Hixon, which had been converted to automatic half-barrier operation in July 1967. Incidentally, Hixon was only eight miles (13 km) from the pioneering installation at Spath.

== Low-loader movements ==
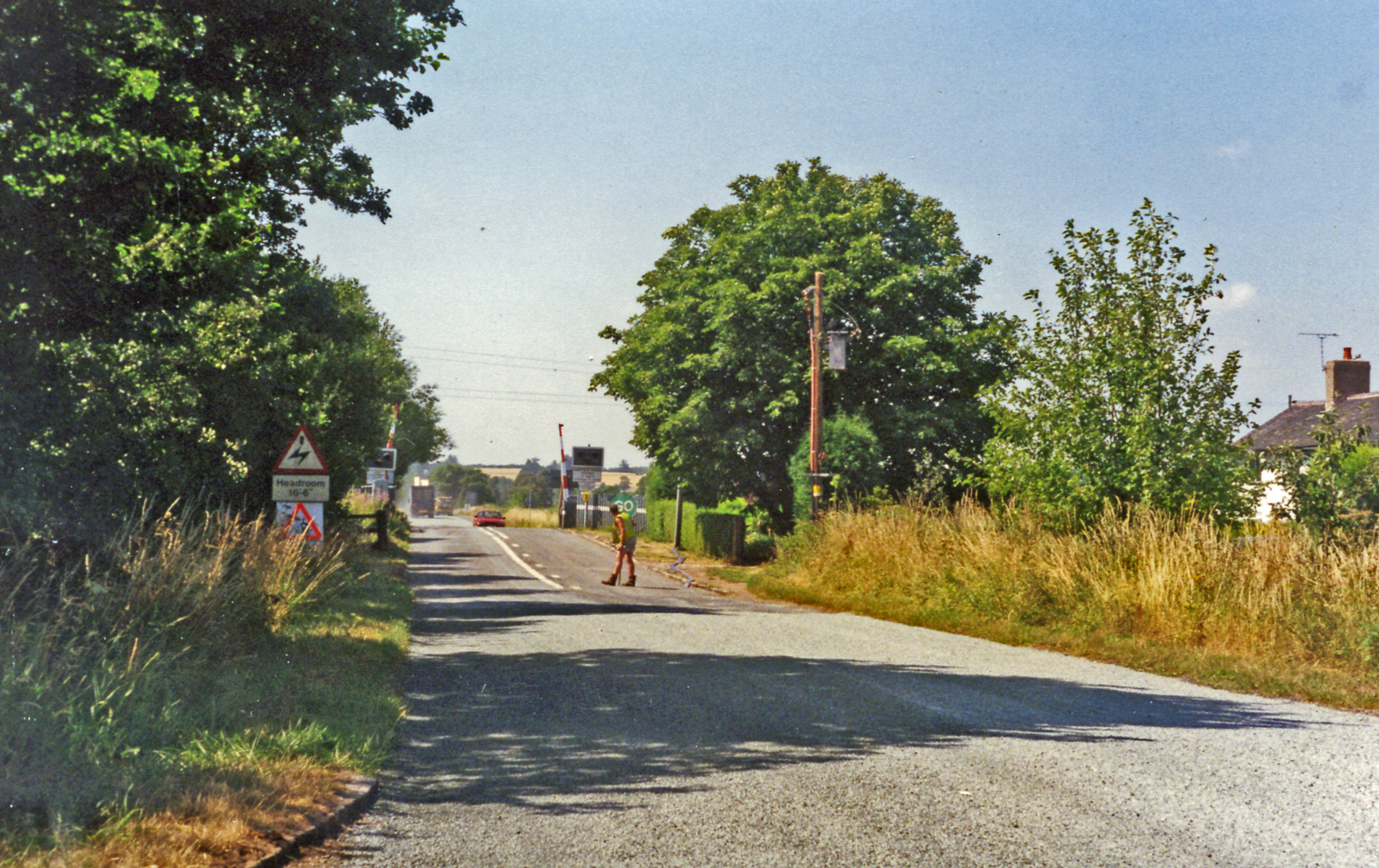
The site of the accident in 1995. The level crossing has now been replaced with a bridge with the sections of road either side of the railway kept as cul-de-sacs.

On 6 January 1968, a 120-ton electrical transformer was to be moved from the English Electric works at Stafford to a storage depot at the disused RAF Hixon airfield. The airfield was on Station Road, adjacent to the Manchester branch of the West Coast Main Line and approximately three miles (4.8 km) north of Colwich Junction.

To carry out this move a huge transporter vehicle, 148 feet (45 m) long and with a 32-wheeled trailer, was chartered. It had a gross weight of 162 tons, was impelled by a tractor unit at each end, and had a crew of five. In charge of the vehicle was B. H. Groves, who occupied the leading cab. The journey was not an unusual procedure as six other abnormal loads belonging to the English Electric Company had passed over the automatic crossing in the preceding months.

The transporter and its police escort left Stafford at approximately 09:30 on the morning of Saturday 6 January. Although Hixon was only six miles (9.7 km) from Stafford, the nature of the load meant that it needed to travel south out of the town and then along a somewhat laborious route north via the M6 motorway, the A34 to Stone and finally the A51 to Hixon. This route had been approved by the Ministry of Transport, but the map of the route made no mention of the level crossing at Hixon; the description of the route in the Order merely ended with "Weston to junc class III road approx 2 miles (3.2 km) past Hixon turn left class III road turn left access road to English Electric Works and destination". J. H. Preston, Chief of Heavy Transport at English Electric, had mentioned the level crossing to Groves – but only as a landmark.

At around 12:20 the transporter turned off the A51 into Station Road and slowed to walking pace as it approached the crossing. It stopped for a moment while the police car went over the crossing to check where the entrance to the airfield was; on its return, one of the police officers told Groves that "this is the place" and proceeded back over the level crossing.

The trailer needed to be raised by the crew to negotiate the track, but, in addition, it needed to be low enough to clear the overhead lines. While this was taking place the transporter slowed to around 2 mph (3.2 km/h). At this speed, it would take approximately one minute to traverse the crossing.

== Crash ==
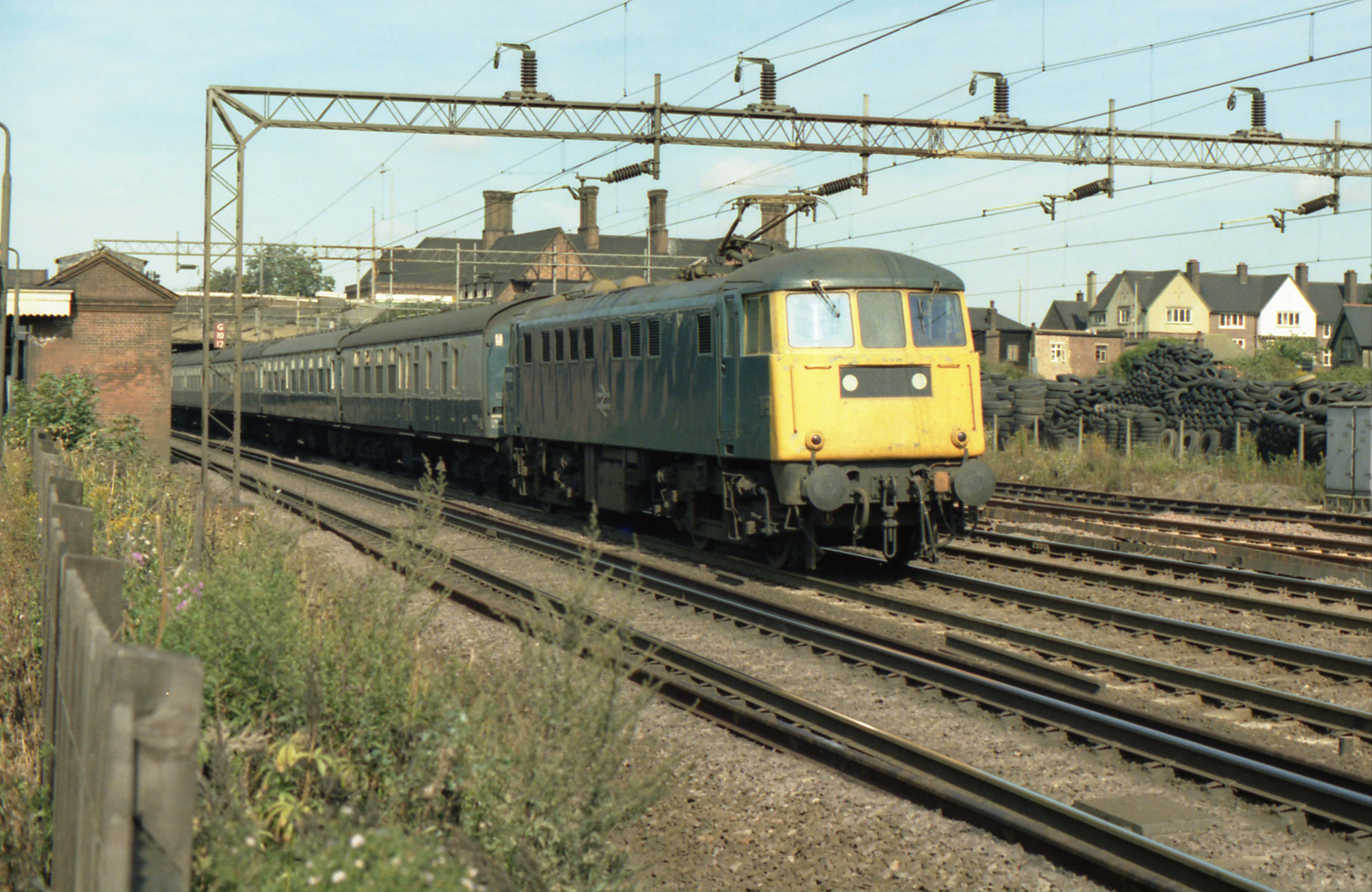
A Class AL1 locomotive similar to the one involved in the accident, 1979

At 12:26, the leading tractor had traversed the two railway tracks and the main bulk of the transporter was astride them when the 11:30 express train from Manchester to London Euston activated the crossing sequence by operating a treadle 1,000 yards (910 m) away. The warning lights began to flash and the bells began to ring, with the barrier descending onto the forward part of the transformer. At about the same time Groves, who had not heard the bells and could not see the lights, saw the train approaching from his left and, realising that it would not stop, shouted a warning to his crew. He then accelerated and so did the driver of the tractor at the rear, A. L. Illsley, although this meant that Illsley was deliberately bringing himself into the direct path of the train.

As a result of these actions, the train hit only the rear seven or eight feet (2.1 to 2.4 m) of the transformer at approximately 75 mph (121 km/h), sheared through the trailer and threw the transformer forward and to the left of the line. The train consisted of a Class AL1 electric locomotive No. E3009 and twelve Mark 1 and Mark 2 coaches. The locomotive and the first five coaches of the train were destroyed, and the following three coaches were derailed. Both railway lines were destroyed for a length of 120 yards (110 m) and the overhead lines were brought down.

Eleven people (eight passengers and three railwaymen) were killed, with 45 being injured, six of them seriously. The relatively small number of casualties was due to the sturdy steel construction of the coaches and the first class carriages at the front being only lightly occupied. The three railwaymen were all in the cab of the locomotive but the second class coaches were filled to capacity, with standing room only, after a large number of sixth form students boarded after a conference at Keele University.

== Investigation ==
A leaflet distributed to police stations shortly before the automatic crossing was commissioned in July 1967. It had not been seen by either of the officers who escorted the load.

The circumstances of the accident, and the subsequent public reaction, led to an Order being made on 16 January for a judicial inquiry under Section 7 of the Railways Act 1871; this was required because HMRI, which would normally hold an accident inquiry, was involved in the programme of automating level crossings. The findings of this inquiry would be presented to Parliament by the Minister for Transport. This was the first Section 7 inquiry since the Tay Bridge disaster of 1879. It was chaired by Mr E.B. Gibbens QC.

=== The haulage company ===
The inquiry identified the directors of the haulage company, Robert Wynn and Sons Ltd, as being chiefly to blame. It transpired that, on 8 November 1966, one of their transporters had narrowly avoided disaster when it became grounded on an automatic crossing at Leominster. A catastrophe was only avoided after its driver violently revved the engine and let the clutch in.

Wynn's had pointed out their concern at the short warning time given in a letter to British Railways, but received a terse reply from the assistant general manager of the Western Region, and therefore did not press the matter further. BR's reply to them said, "I must emphasise ... that the hazard was of your firm's making and it is fortunate that it was not more than a hazard". This was described as being "remarkable for its arrogance and lack of insight".

Despite this incident, no instructions regarding automatic crossings had ever been given to Wynn's drivers (or the police escort), and at Hixon the driver assumed that it was safe to cross because the police car had already done so.

=== The role of the police ===
Neither of the police officers who were escorting the load had been to Hixon before. They had both been posted to traffic duties in the Stone Division five days earlier and they were unaware of the presence of a main railway line. Although both officers knew about the existence of automatic crossings in Staffordshire, they were not aware of the comparatively short warning time that the crossing gave, one of them later telling the inquiry, "I was absolutely astounded by the speed of the whole process."

Leaflets had been distributed to local police stations when the crossing was automated the previous July, although they were only on display for the public to pick up. The inquiry described them as "mere flotsam".

=== British Rail ===
Both British Rail and the Ministry of Transport also received criticism for their lack of foresight and failure to adequately point out that drivers of slow or heavy loads were required to use the telephone provided before crossing the line. There was a warning notice at Hixon crossing to this effect, but it was almost impossible to read from a passing vehicle. The telephones at some crossings were installed by BR despite HMRI being opposed to their provision.

== Aftermath ==
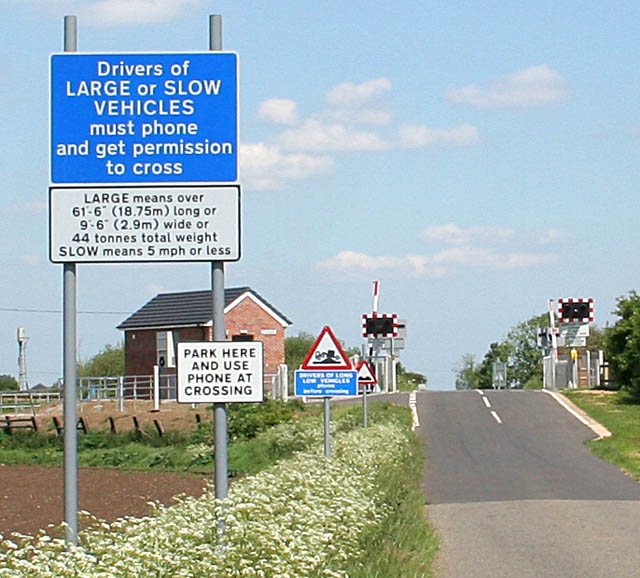
A level crossing in Lincolnshire, showing the improved signage introduced from 1969. This crossing also has an additional warning sign regarding the risk of long vehicles being grounded.

From 1969, improved warning signs were introduced, informing drivers of large or slow vehicles that they should telephone the signalman for permission to cross the line, and telephones were provided at most crossings. The crossing equipment was also modified so that an amber light was exhibited before the red flashing lights operated. Even so, the automation of level crossings ground almost to a halt; from 207 in 1968, to 234 in 1978.

In 1977, the Railway Inspectorate again examined the question of automating level crossings and once again a working party visited mainland Europe. This time, as well as relaxing the requirements, they recommended the introduction of an automatic crossing with only the warning lights, known as an Automatic Open Crossing (AOCR). However, history repeated itself in the Lockington rail accident of 1986, which involved a newly installed AOCR.

The level crossing at Hixon was replaced in 2002 by a bridge costing £2 million.

Two carriages involved in the collision (Mark 1 Tourist Second Opens 4963 and 4973) are now preserved. Marshalled behind the Restaurant Kitchen Buffet car, they derailed, coming to rest alongside the wrecked transformer, receiving light damage. The undamaged Mark 2 TSO 5191 is also preserved.

In 2017, a book The Hixon Railway Disaster was published by Richard Westwood, whose father Jack Westwood was a BR signal technician at Leominster who phoned the signalman to set the distant and home signals to danger thus avoiding an earlier (1966) accident with a slow Wynn's transporter. He highlighted friction between railway managers and HMRI on fears expressed by the former regarding potential safety hazards, and lack of anticipation of the potential hazard from slow-moving heavy vehicles even after the Leominster near-miss. Likewise, Fraser Pithie has criticised the role of the HMRI which was 'in the driving seat' with the installation of AHB (automatic half barriers), not BR. Colonel McMullen had stated in 1957 that if they were adopted "the principle must be recognised that it is the responsibility of the individual to protect himself from the hazards of the railway in the same way as from the hazards of the road". Colonel Reed of the HMRI was put in charge of AHB introduction in 1961, and he opposed the provision of telephones or signal protection. But some BR managers still ensured that a telephone was provided at AHB crossings, and Hixon had a telephone.

As of 2018, the former airfield continues to be the site of various industrial units, known as the Hixon Airfield Industrial Estate.

=== Commemorations ===
On 6 January 2018, on the fiftieth anniversary of the disaster, a memorial stone in Hixon village churchyard was dedicated to those who died in the crash. Another memorial stone is by the railway bridge close to the site of the accident.

On 19 August 2021, CrossCountry train 220009 was named Hixon at Stafford railway station in memory of the accident.

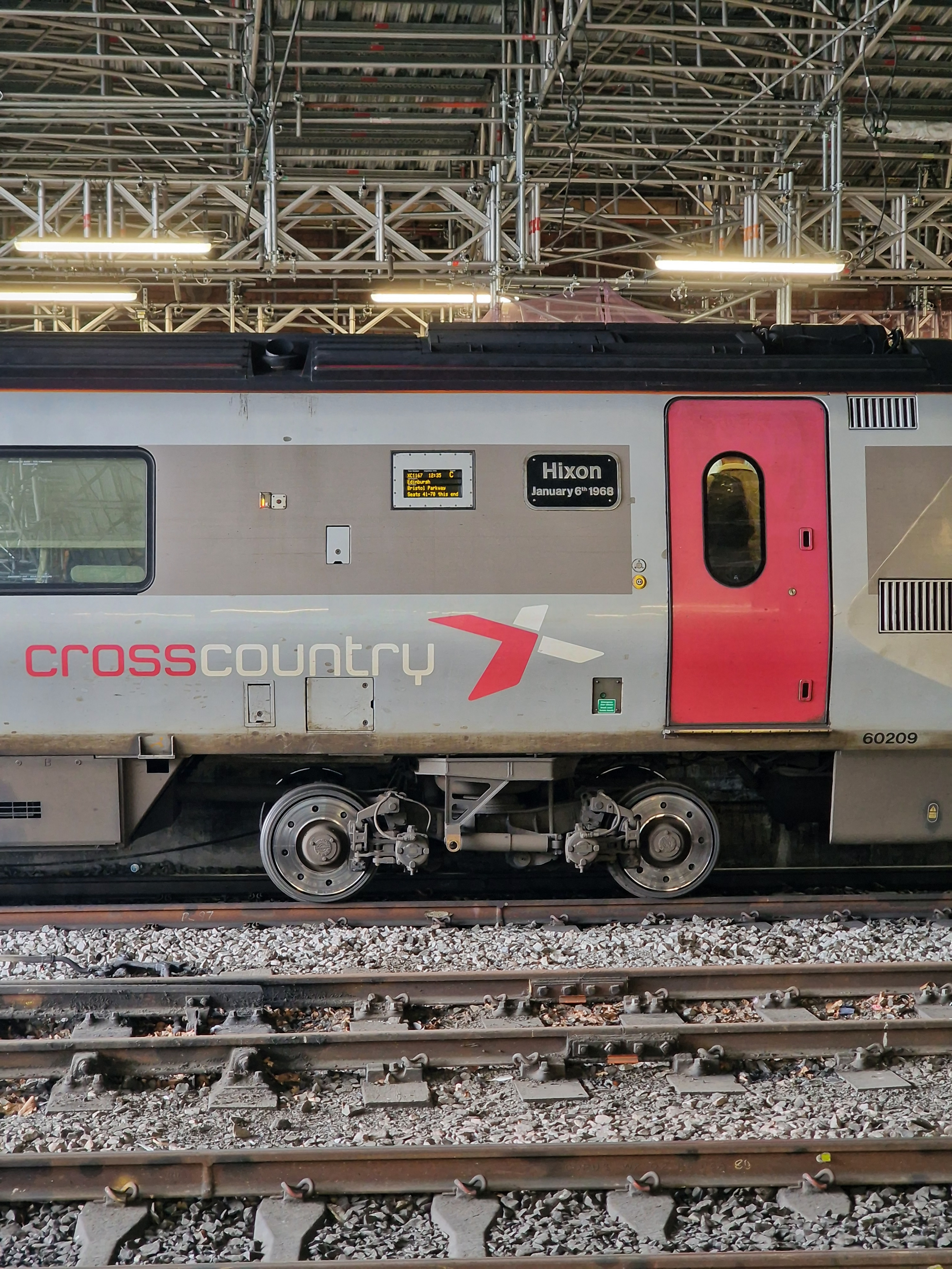
220009 Hixon at Bristol Temple Meads

== See also ==
- Level crossings in the United Kingdom
- 2015 Halifax train crash
- Dalfsen train crash
