= Listed buildings in Lockington, East Riding of Yorkshire =

Lockington is a civil parish in the county of the East Riding of Yorkshire, England. It contains eleven listed buildings that are recorded in the National Heritage List for England. Of these, one is listed at Grade I, the highest of the three grades, and the others are at Grade II, the lowest grade. The parish contains the village of Lockington, the hamlet of Aike, and the surrounding countryside. Most of the listed buildings are houses, and the others include a church, a former rectory, a farmhouse and farm building, a former public house, and a former railway station.

== Key ==
Grade	Criteria
I	Buildings of exceptional interest, sometimes considered to be internationally important
II	Buildings of national importance and special interest

== Buildings ==
Name and location	Photograph	Date	Notes	Grade
St Mary's Church; 53.90827°N 0.48360°W		12th century	The church has been altered and extended through the centuries, including a restoration by Temple Moore in 1893–94. It is built in stone and some brick, particularly on the top part of the tower, and has roofs of tiled and lead. The church consists of a nave, a south chapel, a chancel and a west tower. The tower has three stages, a blocked west doorway with a chamfered surround and a pointed head, lancet windows, a moulded string course, lancet bell openings and an embattled parapet. The chapel also has an embattled parapet incorporating a coat of arms. The south doorway is Norman, with three orders, primitive capitals and zigzag decoration. On the west side of the door head is an ogee-headed niche under a gablet.	I
Hall Garth; 53.90621°N 0.48244°W		1685	The manor house, which was later extended, is in red brick, and has a tile roof with coped gables on kneelers, and finials. There are two storeys, three bays, and a later rear wing. On the front is a projecting porch with a round-headed opening under a gauged brick arch, and above it is a datestone containing a coat of arms. Most of the windows are sashes, there is one two-light mullioned window, and all have wedge lintels.	II
Sunnyside; 53.89799°N 0.40481°W	—	18th century	The house is in colourwashed brick, with a dentiled brick eaves cornice and a pantile roof. There is one storey and attics, and three bays. The doorway and the windows, which are horizontally sliding sashes, are under segmental arches.	II
54 Front Street; 53.91251°N 0.48418°W		Late 18th century	The house is in brown brick, with a dentilled brick eaves cornice, and a pantile roof. There are two storeys, three bays, and a continuous rear outshut. The central doorway has pilasters and a fanlight. The windows are sashes, those on the ground floor under cambered brick arches.	II
82 Front Street; 53.91378°N 0.48710°W		Late 18th century	The house is in colourwashed brick, with a dentilled brick eaves cornice, and a pantile roof with tumbled-in brick to the raised gables. There are two storeys and five bays. The central doorway has a divided fanlight, and the windows are sashes, those on the ground floor with segmental brick arches.	II
Ivy House; 53.91081°N 0.48593°W	—	Late 18th century	The house is in brick, with a dentilled brick eaves cornice, and a pantile roof with tumbled-in brick to the raised gables. There are two storeys, three bays, a continuous rear outshut, and a single-storey single-bay extension to the right. The doorway has pilasters, the windows are sashes, those on the upper floor horizontally sliding, and all have cambered brick arches. On the extension is a low coped parapet ramped up to the house.	II
Former Rockingham Arms; 53.91244°N 0.48398°W		Late 18th century	The house, at one time a public house, is in colourwashed brick and has a pantile roof with tumbled-in brick to the raised gables. There are two storeys and four bays. The doorway is approached by steps, and has an oblong fanlight, and the windows are sashes. The ground floor openings have cambered brick arches, and the window above the doorway is a dummy.	II
Lockington House; 53.90870°N 0.48402°W	—	Late 18th to early 19th century	Originally the rectory, the house is in colourwashed red brick, with a moulded stone cornice, and hipped slate roofs. There are two storeys, an L-shaped plan, and fronts of six and five bays. On the front is a two-storey canted bay window, and a Tuscan porch and a doorway with a fanlight with radial glazing. The windows are sashes with cambered channelled wedge lintels and raised feathered keystones.	II
Rectory Farmhouse and walls 53.90976°N 0.47270°W		c. 1820–30	The farmhouse is in brown brick with a hipped slate roof. There are two storeys and three bays. The central doorway has pilasters, a fanlight with intersecting cusped glazing bars, and a projecting hood. The windows are sashes, those on the ground floor with flat gauged brick arches. The house is flanked by wing walls with brick coping, ramped up to the house.	II
Cart shed, Rectory Farm; 53.90984°N 0.47316°W		1826	The cart shed is in red brick with a pantile roof. There are two storeys and six bays. The ground floor contains six segmental-headed arches on cylindrical piers flanked by boarded doors in round-headed arches, and on the upper floor the date is formed by the decorated ends of four wrought iron ties.	II
Former Lockington railway station 53.90827°N 0.43933°W		1846	The railway station, later converted for residential use, was designed by G. T. Andrews for the York and North Midland Railway. It is in colourwashed brick, with stone dressings, a moulded floor band, oversailing eaves and a slate roof. There are two storeys and four bays. On the front is a tetrastyle Tuscan portico, an entablature and a blocking course. The doorway has a divided fanlight, and the windows are sashes in shallow segmental-headed recesses. On the extreme right is a posting box, and on the right return is a shallow canted bay window.	II
