= St Mary's Church, Lockington =

Church in Lockington, East Riding of Yorkshire, England

Coordinates: 53°54′30″N 0°29′01″W

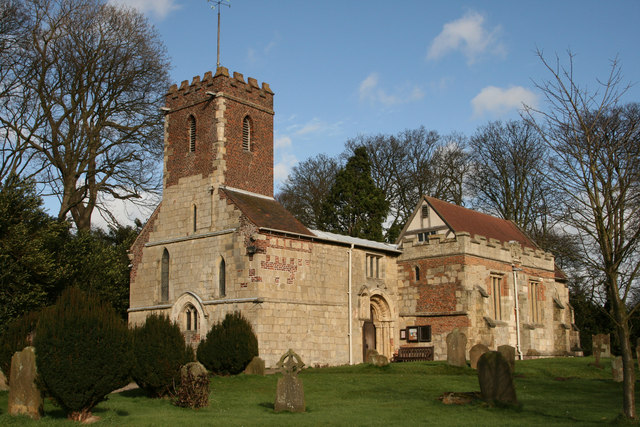
The church, in 2008

St Mary's Church is the parish church of Lockington, East Riding of Yorkshire, a village in England.

The church may lie on an Anglo-Saxon burial site. It was built in the mid-12th century, probably by William Fossard. Early in the 13th century, a tower was added, followed in the early 14th century by the chancel, and later that century by a south chapel. The chapel was rebuilt in 1635 and the tower at a similar date. The chapel was restored by Charles Constable in 1851, and the remainder of the building was restored between 1893 and 1894 by Temple Moore. The building was grade I listed in 1968.

The chancel

The church is built of stone and some brick, particularly on the top part of the tower, and has roofs of tiles and lead. The church consists of a nave, a south chapel, a chancel and a west tower. The tower has three stages, a blocked west doorway with a chamfered surround and a pointed head, lancet windows, a moulded string course, lancet bell openings and an embattled parapet. The chapel also has an embattled parapet incorporating a coat of arms. The south doorway is Norman, with three orders, primitive capitals and zigzag decoration. On the west side of the door head is an ogee-headed niche under a gablet. Inside, the west end has a screen designed by Temple Moore, which reuses 17th- and 18th-century woodwork. The pulpit is 18th century, while the font may date from the 12th century, on a modern base. The chancel has a piscina, while the chapel has the tomb of Mary Moyser, who died in 1633, with effigies of her and her children.

== See also ==
- Grade I listed buildings in the East Riding of Yorkshire
- Listed buildings in Lockington, East Riding of Yorkshire
