= Ashton, Cambridgeshire =

Hamlet in Cambridgeshire, England

Coordinates: 52.631042°N 0.369128°W

Ashton
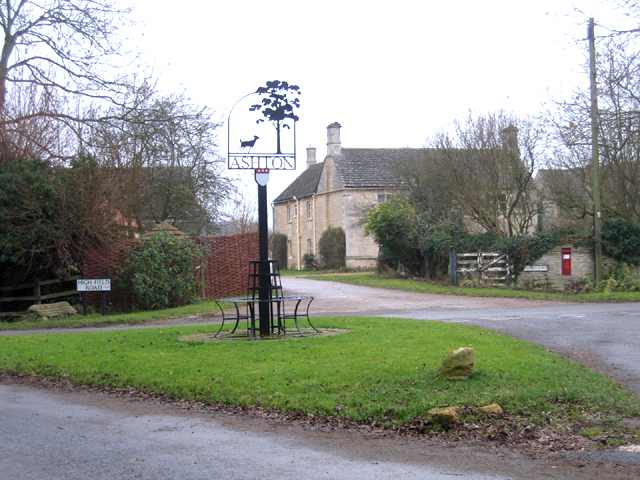
- Signpost in Ashton

- Location within Cambridgeshire
- OS grid reference: TF104049
- Civil parish: Bainton
- Unitary authority: Peterborough
- Ceremonial county: Cambridgeshire
- Region: East
- Country: England
- Sovereign state: United Kingdom
- Post town: STAMFORD
- Postcode district: PE9
- Police: Cambridgeshire
- Fire: Cambridgeshire
- Ambulance: East of England

Ashton is a hamlet and former civil parish, now in the parish of Bainton, in the Peterborough district, in the ceremonial county of Cambridgeshire, England. In 1881 the parish had a population of 106.

== History ==
Ashton was formerly in the parish of Ufford, from 1866 Ashton was a civil parish in its own right, on 24 March 1887 the parish was abolished and merged with Bainton.
