= Walton, Peterborough =

Area of Peterborough, England

Coordinates: 52°36′15″N 0°15′48″W

Walton
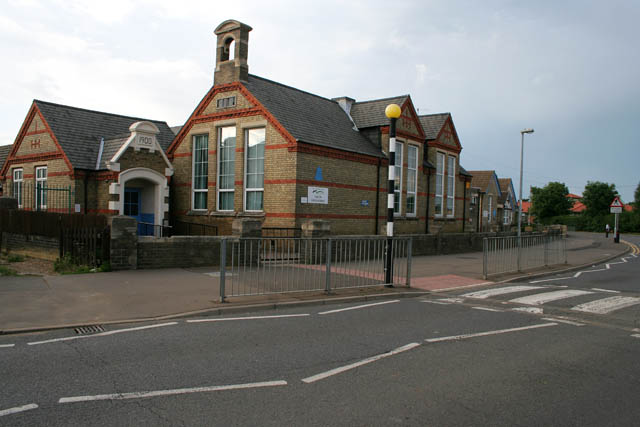
- Walton Infant School

- Location within Cambridgeshire
- OS grid reference: TF1702
- Unitary authority: Peterborough
- Shire county: Cambridgeshire
- Region: East
- Country: England
- Sovereign state: United Kingdom
- Post town: PETERBOROUGH
- Postcode district: PE4
- Dialling code: 01733

Walton is a residential area and electoral ward of the city of Peterborough in the ceremonial county of Cambridgeshire, England. Manufacturers of industrial machinery, Peter Brotherhood, relocated here from London in 1906.

Walton County Infant and Junior schools were amalgamated in September 2007 to form a single Primary School; following the closure of Walton Comprehensive School in July 2007, secondary pupils attend Queen Katharine Academy which opened in September 2007 as The Voyager School but later changed.

Walton is home to a semimajor retail hub which has a large Morrison's supermarket, two drive-thru restaurants and 5 large retailers in the main Brotherhoods retail park. Past this is a mediocre industrial estate with dealerships, gyms, logistic centres, supermarkets and a post-office.

== Civil parish ==
Walton became a parish in 1866, on 1 April 1929 it was abolished and merged with Peterborough. In 1921 the parish had a population of 1118.

== See also ==
- Walton railway station
