= Walton railway station (Cambridgeshire) =

Former railway station in England

Coordinates: 52.6045°N 0.2745°W

Walton
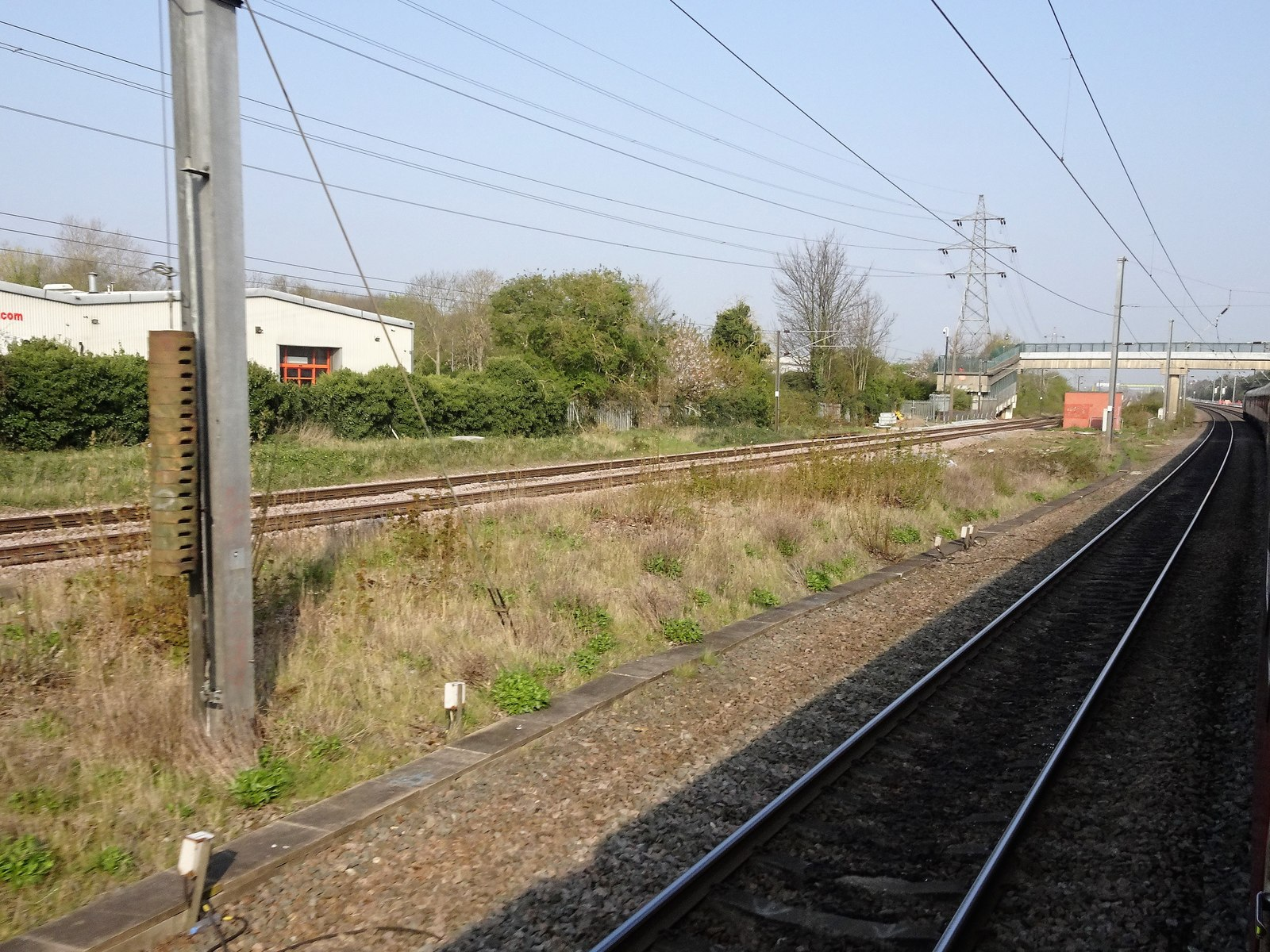
- The site of the station in 2019

General information
- Location: Walton, City of Peterborough; England
- Grid reference: TF169022
- Platforms: 2

Other information
- Status: Disused

History
- Pre-grouping: Midland Railway
- Post-grouping: London, Midland and Scottish Railway; Eastern Region of British Railways

Key dates
- 2 October 1846: Opened
- 7 December 1953: Closed
Location

Walton railway station was a station in Walton, Cambridgeshire. It was on the Midland Railway's Syston and Peterborough Railway line between Peterborough and Stamford. It was closed in 1953. The Great Northern Railway main line runs adjacent to the Midland Railway at this point, but the Great Northern never had a station in Walton. This was due to an agreement whereby the Midland carried materials to the site during construction of the Great Northern, and in return the Great Northern offered no competition for services on this section

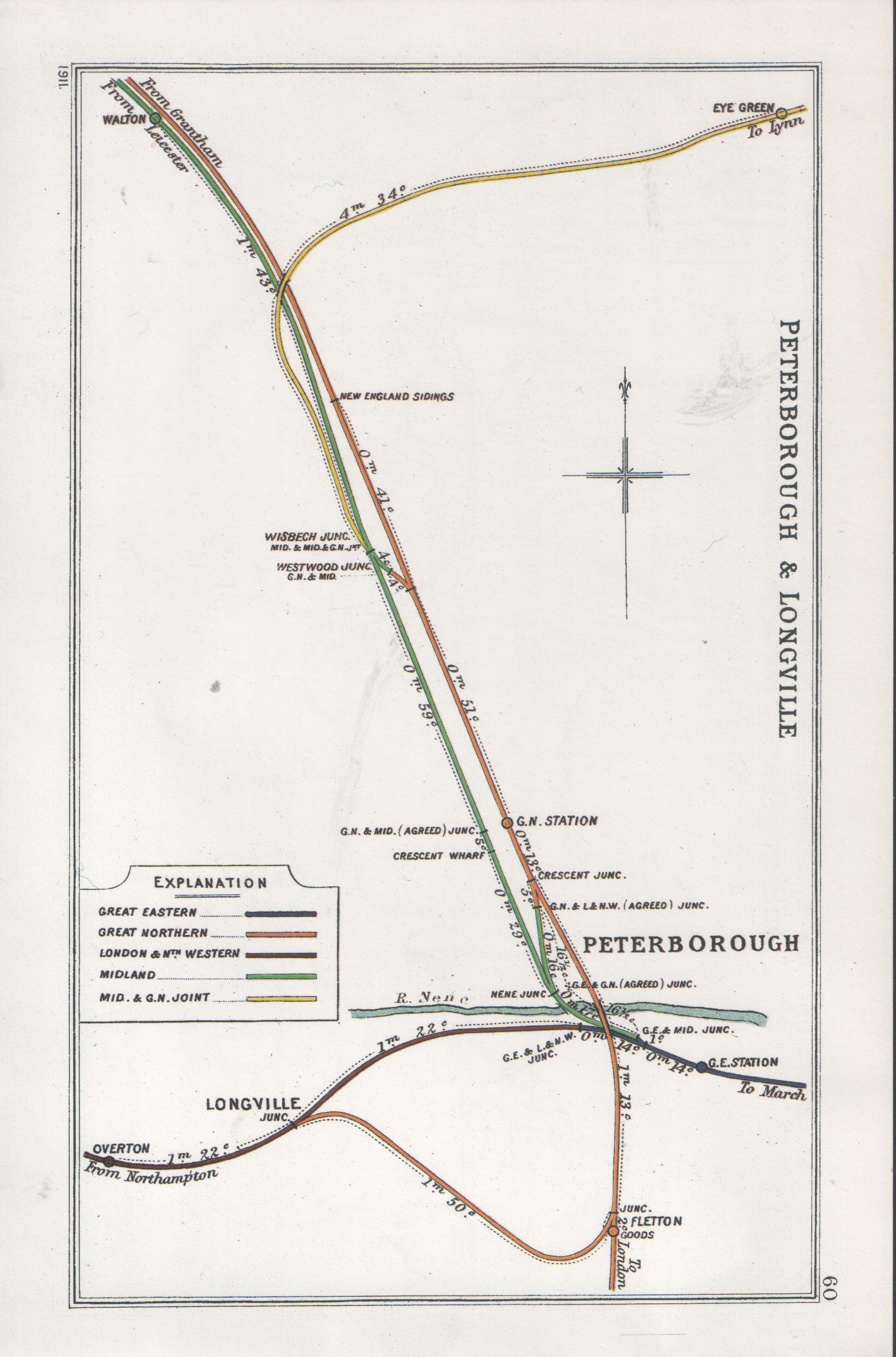
A 1911 Railway Clearing House Junction Diagram showing railways in the vicinity of Walton (top left)

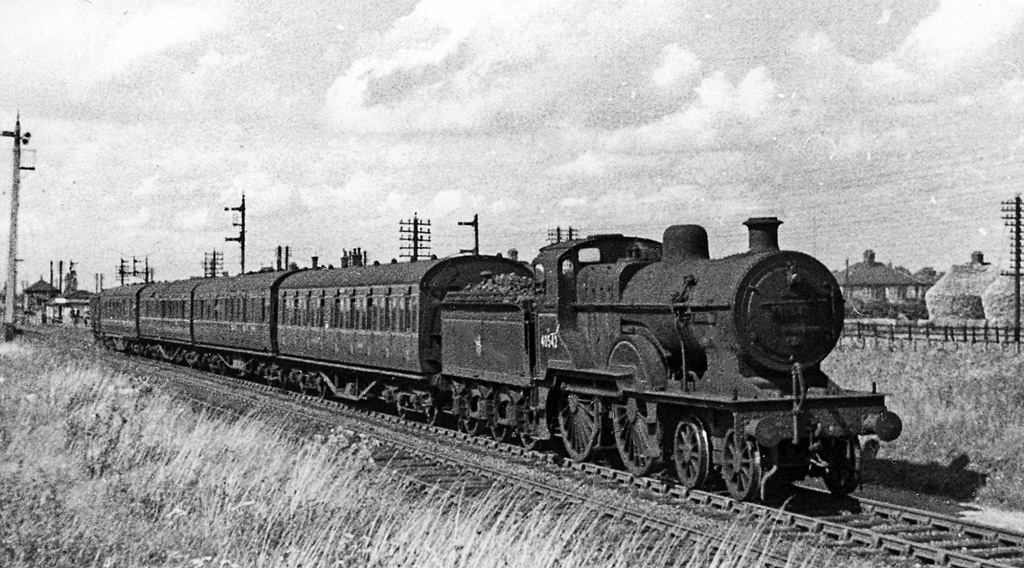
Midland line at Walton in 1950

Preceding station	Historical railways	Following station
Helpston	Midland Railway; Leicester to Peterborough	Peterborough North
