= Level crossings in the United Kingdom =

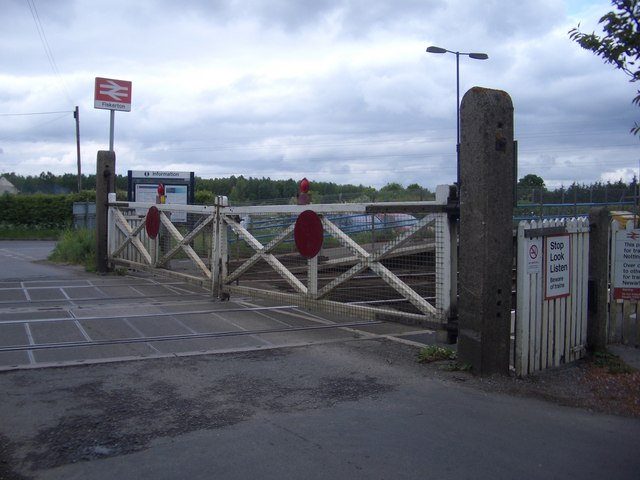
A gated crossing at Fiskerton, Nottinghamshire (now MCB-OD), that is manually operated by a signalman. These crossings are slowly becoming rarer as they are being replaced with modern automated crossings.

Level crossing warning signs and plates.

With barriers or gates

Open crossing

With warning lights (note the amber light, introduced after the 1968 Hixon rail crash)

There are around 6,000 railway level crossings in the United Kingdom, of which about 1,500 are public highway crossings. This number is gradually being reduced as the risk of accidents at level crossings is considered high. The director of the UK Railway Inspectorate commented in 2004 that "the use of level crossings contributes the greatest potential for catastrophic risk on the railways." The creation of new level crossings on the national network is now illegal (the exceptions being reopening unavoidable crossings on brand new lines or reopening closed railway lines, and on heritage railways), with grade separation by way of bridges and tunnels being the more popular options. The cost of making significant reductions, other than by simply closing the crossings, is substantial; some commentators argue that the money could be better spent. Some 5,000 crossings are user-worked crossings or footpaths with very low usage. The removal of crossings can improve train performance and reduce accident rates, as some crossings have low rail speed limits enforced on them to protect road users (e.g. AOCLs). In fact, between 1845 and 1933, there was a 4 miles per hour (6.4 km/h) speed limit on level crossings of turnpike roads adjacent to stations for lines whose authorising act of Parliament had been consolidated in the Railways Clauses Consolidation Act 1845 although this limit was at least sometimes (and possibly often) disregarded. (Note: The requirement that trains travel at 4 mph across some level crossings was abolished by schedule 3 of the Road and Rail Traffic Act 1933.)

== History ==
Gated level crossings were mandatory from 1839, but initial rules were for the gates to be ordinarily kept closed across the highway. The original form of road level crossing on British railways dates from 1842 onwards, it consisted of two or four wooden gates (one or two on each side of the railway). When open to road traffic, the gates were closed across the railway to prevent horses and livestock inadvertently escaping onto the railway. The gates were operated by railway staff usually by hand or later by capstan wheel from a signal box and they were generally interlocked with the signals protecting the crossing. Where a signal box was not nearby but road traffic still warranted a full gated crossing a dedicated crossing keeper would be employed, often living in a railway-owned cottage adjacent to the crossing and in communication with the signal boxes via the telegraph system.

Following trials in 1952, lifting barriers were permitted to be used instead of swinging gates by section 40 of the British Transport Commission Act 1954 (2 & 3 Eliz. 2. c. lv), although they still had to be manually controlled by a crossing keeper. This reduced the amount of time that road traffic was disrupted.

In 1955 various European countries were visited and automatic crossings examined by two inspecting officers from the Railways Inspectorate (HMRI), two road engineers from the Ministry of Transport, and two officers from the British Transport Commission (see Hixon rail crash). They visited 46 crossings in 10 days in three countries; Belgium, France and the Netherlands. The report was signed on 14 March 1957, with section 66 of the British Transport Commission Act 1957 (5 & 6 Eliz. 2. c. xxxiii) giving powers to prescribe "safety arrangements at public level crossings such as automatically or remotely operated barriers".

Work on automated crossings continued, with the first automatically operated level crossing commencing operation at Spath near Uttoxeter in Staffordshire in May 1961. Automatic half-barrier crossings later came into being after another enquiry abroad in 1963, consisting of a single-arm each side of the road, which block only oncoming traffic leaving the exits clear. Half barriers were originally considered to have an advantage as they had a short closure time and did not require to be interlocked with signals.

After the Hixon rail crash in 1968, it became clear that more warnings were needed for large vehicles at AHBCs (automatic half barrier crossings). The vehicle in question (a low-load transporter carrying a large electrical transformer), despite being escorted by police, was struck by a train whilst crossing the tracks at 2 miles per hour (3.2 km/h) on an AHBC installed a year before. The changes made to AHBCs were additional information signage, telephones to signal boxes and the addition of a preliminary amber light to the pair of red lights at all crossings (plus a now defunct 'Another train coming' illuminated box; now just a piece of signage is needed). The provision of telephones at these crossings had been opposed by Colonel Reed of the Railways Inspectorate (HMRI), although some BR managers still installed them. Colonel McMullen of HMRI had stated in 1957 that if automatic half barrier crossings were adopted "the principle must be recognised that it is the responsibility of the individual to protect himself from the hazards of the railway in the same way as from the hazards of the road". Wynns, the operator of the low-load transporter had received a terse reply from British Rail when they wrote about a near-disaster with a slow transporter in Leominster in 1966.

The automatic open crossing (now known as AOCL, with the 'L' standing for locally monitored) was introduced in 1963. These have no barriers, a St Andrew's Cross above each warning light, and have an indicator light to show correct working. The first to be installed was at Yafforth in North Yorkshire in 1963. These crossings were cheaper than installing AHBCs and were much suited to quiet country lanes, which is why many more were installed in the 1970s, albeit destined to be replaced by AOCRs (automatic open crossing remotely monitored) as they had a greater line speed potential and were even cheaper than AOCLs. The first of these AOCRs to be installed was at Naas crossing near Lydney, Gloucestershire in 1983. These continued to be installed until the Lockington rail crash occurred in 1986, which saw the demise of this type of crossing with nearly all AOCRs being upgraded to AHBCs. Only one remains in the UK at present; on the national network at Rosarie, near Keith, Moray.

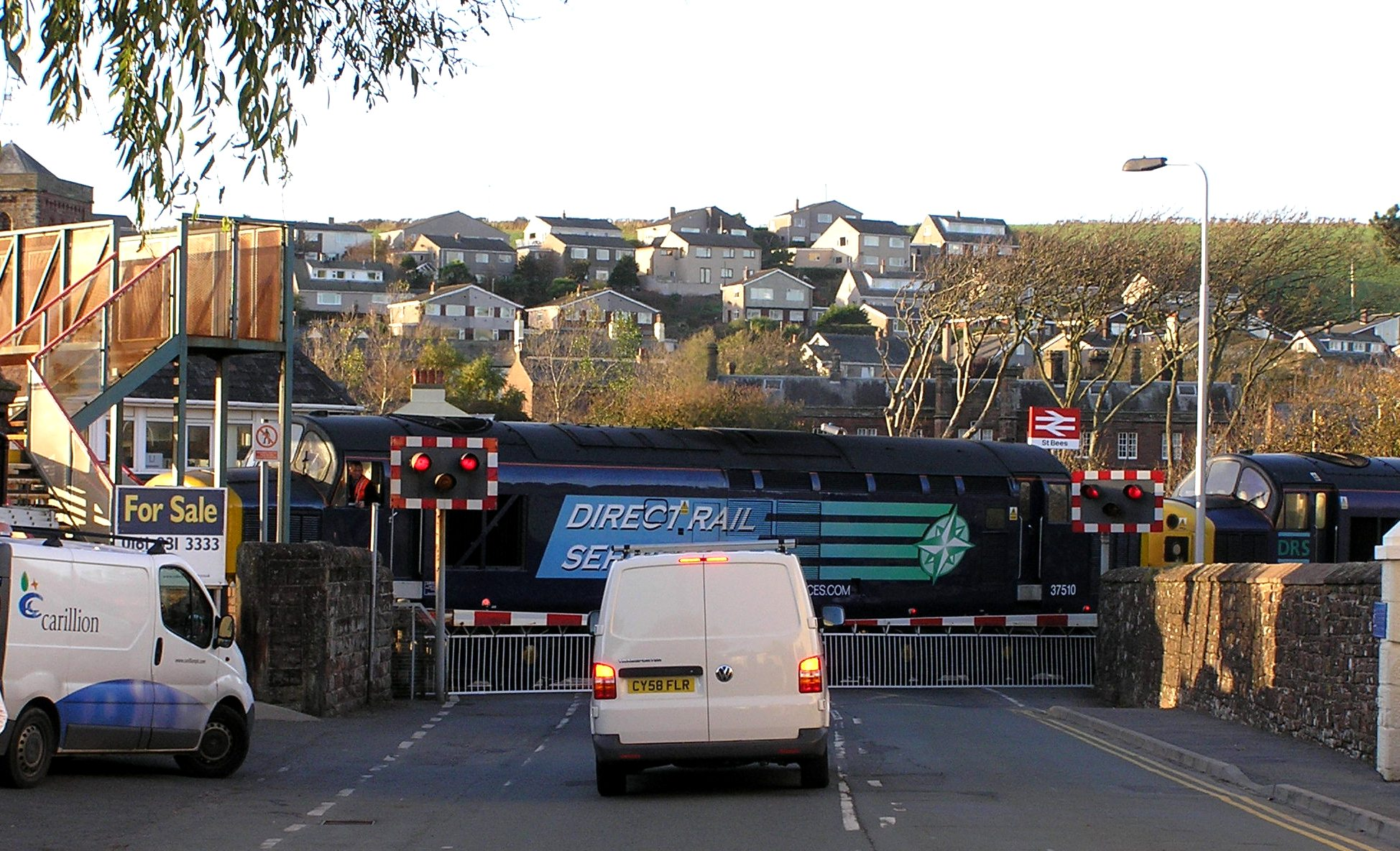
A full barrier level crossing in St Bees, Cumbria, that is controlled by the adjacent signal box

The Ufton Nervet rail crash in 2004 was an eye-opener for many people involved with level crossings and since then the highlight on crossing safety has increased, with crossings being closed or upgraded; most notably AOCLs being upgraded to automatic barrier crossing locally monitored (ABCL) status. In 2009 after the Halkirk crossing crash in Scotland, it was seen that the AOCLs on the network were the most dangerous crossing and a scheme to eradicate them was put forward. In order to do it quickly and cheaply, the full conversion to ABCL status was not done, and instead the simple addition of barriers to create an AOCL+B was the go-to option. Upgrades and closures still continue into the future, with newer systems (and trials of different equipment) such as the AFBCL (automatic full barrier crossing locally monitored) being installed in Ardrossan in 2018.

The level crossing at Helpston in Cambridgeshire is one of the largest crossings in the country, crossing six tracks (grouped as four tracks of the 125 mph East Coast Mainline, and two tracks of the Birmingham–Peterborough line). The nearby Maxey Level Crossing also has six tracks, as well as Exeter 'Red Cow' LC.

== Safety ==
After the Ufton Nervet rail crash, there have been increased efforts to review the placing of level crossings and to eliminate them where this is practicable. In the UK it has also been suggested that cameras similar to the type used to detect drivers who run traffic lights be deployed at level crossings, and that penalties for ignoring signals should be much more severe.

British Transport Police typically prosecute motorists who jump the barriers, for either trespass or failing to conform with a traffic signal. A particular problem has been that the responsibility for road safety at crossings is entirely outside the control of the railways. In 2006 there were legal proposals to permit Network Rail to be involved in the road side safety of crossings. This would allow the introduction of anti-slip surfaces and also barriers to prevent motorists driving around crossing arms and, it is hoped, reduce the number of crossing-related deaths.

Network Rail is pursuing a policy of closing level crossings at the rate of over 100 a year in the interests of safety, and replacing them with road bridges or footbridges. The number of level crossings on rail lines controlled by Network Rail went from 7,937 in 2003–04 to 6,322 in 2013–14, and 5,887 by 2016–17. The number of crossings rose to 5,939 in 2017–18. This was due to the increased number of footpath crossing with and without lights compared to the number reported in 2016–17. This is due to a change in the categorisation of level crossings when they are added to the All Level Crossing Risk Model (ALCRM) and doesn't represent a physical increase in the number of crossings on the network.

For the episode of British motoring television programme Top Gear on 25 February 2007, Network Rail staged an incident in which a locomotive was driven into a Renault Espace at around 80 miles per hour (130 km/h) at an AHBC level crossing at Hibaldstow, Lincolnshire to graphically illustrate the dangers of "running the risk" (see British Rail Class 31 in the media).

== Types of crossing ==
=== MG – manually controlled gates ===
These legacy gated crossings are locally operated by a signaller or other railway staff. They consist of wooden or metal gates that close against road traffic and may be operated by hand; operated by a wheel; driven by a motor; or more recently at Redcar, gates that are electrically telescopic. All motor-driven swing gates have been removed. When closed to road traffic, the gates are detected/locked and the protecting signal/s can be released. Some crossings are also provided with road lights that operate before the gates are closed. These crossings no longer meet current safety standards and are being renewed with more modern designs of barrier crossings. On some crossings, such as those between Hammerton and Poppleton on the Harrogate line, the gates are normally closed against road traffic, and are only opened to allow vehicles to pass.

=== MCB – manually controlled barriers ===
An MCB crossing is controlled by an adjacent signalbox where the signalman can view the road closure and determine that the crossing is clear before releasing the protecting signals. Normally an MCB crossing either has two full road width barriers or four half road width barriers that fully close the road. This type of crossing is typically provided with standard road-lights and alarms that operate when closing, though there are a couple of crossings without lights, one being at Arbroath. The first crossing of this type was tested at Warthill, North Yorkshire in 1952.

=== MCBR – manually controlled barriers remotely monitored ===
An MCBR is exactly the same as an MCB crossing except that the controlling signalbox is not directly next to the crossing, but can be within 1/4 mile (400 m) of the crossing. The signaller requires a clear view of the crossing to determine that the crossing is clear before releasing the protecting signals. In poor viewing conditions such as mist, fog or falling snow it may be necessary to appoint an additional person placed at the crossing to advise the signaller that the crossing is clear. An example of this type of crossing is at Driffield, East Riding of Yorkshire.

=== MCB-CCTV – manually controlled barriers monitored with closed-circuit television ===
An MCB-CCTV crossing is the same as an MCB crossing except that it may be many miles away from the controlling signal box. Two CCTV cameras mounted in close proximity to the crossing enables the signaller to monitor the road closure and to determine the crossing is clear, before releasing the protecting signals. The second camera is a backup for when the main camera fails for any reason. This type of crossing has caused many crossing signal boxes to become redundant on various lines across the country. The first crossing of this type was trialled at Funtham's Lane, near Peterborough, Cambridgeshire in 1970.

=== MCB-OD – manually controlled barriers monitored by obstacle detection ===
These crossings are MCBs except that instead of a signaller, the obstacle detection equipment monitors the closure of the crossing and determines that the crossing is clear before releasing the protecting signal. The crossing is initiated by approaching trains and has no direct signaller involvement when working normally, apart from monitoring the process. The obstacle detection uses LIDAR and RADAR systems to detect that the crossing is clear, if it is not the sequence is disrupted and any approaching train would come to a stand at the protecting signal. The signaller would then be required to initiate an alternative operating procedure. This type of crossing has become much more common on many lines throughout the country and these crossings are now considered the safest of the modern types. The first crossing of this type was developed and tested in 2010, at a level crossing at Filey, North Yorkshire however this crossing has now been converted to an MCB-CCTV with a small amount of equipment from the MCB-OD crossing remaining.

=== MCB-OC – manually controlled barrier crossing on call ===
These crossings are exactly the same as MCB-CCTV crossings except the barriers stay down and the lights stay off. When a user wants to cross, they have to press a button to notify the signaller, who will raise the barriers if there is no train. Then, after the signaller sees through the CCTV that the crossing is clear, the lowering sequence will begin with lights flashing, alarms sounding and the barriers lowering. Once all the barriers are down just like before the lights will go out and the alarm will shut off. There are only a handful of these in the UK, one being at Barnetby, Lincolnshire and Retford, Nottinghamshire.

=== AHBC – automatic half barrier crossing ===
The current post-Hixon AHBC/ABCL large vehicle information sign

Automatic half barrier crossings are initiated by approaching trains and are not interlocked with signals, although they are monitored by a signaller for correct operation. The maximum rail line speed over these crossings is 100 miles per hour (160 km/h) and only a maximum of two tracks can be crossed. The crossings have two half-barriers that only close the entrance lanes to the crossing, standard crossing road-lights and audible alarms. At the maximum rail line speed, the crossing warning time is typically about 27 seconds from the amber light first showing to the train arriving at the crossing. These crossings were originally designed for use on roads with infrequent traffic. No new crossings of this type are likely to be installed and many AHBCs are being renewed as MCB-OD or MCB-CCTV. In recent years, some audible alarms at AHBCs have been updated to include spoken warnings as a means to improve safety. The first crossing of this type in the UK was installed in the town of Spath, near Uttoxeter in Staffordshire, and began operating on 5 February 1961.

=== AOCL – automatic open crossing locally monitored ===
An open crossing, with "St Andrew's" crosses, conventional road-lights and audible alarms, but no barriers. On twin tracks an 'Another Train Coming' light is provided which flashes a red light with an 'another train coming' message when appropriate, plus an extension to the St Andrew's crosses. Designed for low traffic railway lines and low traffic roads, the maximum line speed over these crossings is 55 miles per hour (89 km/h). On the railway approach, a Drivers Crossing Indicator (DCI) shows a flashing red light when the crossing is open to road traffic. The crossing should initiate when a train passes a sign with a black St Andrew's Cross on a white background, on the approach to the crossing. If the crossing is operating correctly, the flashing red light changes to a flashing white light Some AOCLs don't have a red light if they're controlled by signals, such as at Thorpe crossing near Joan Croft Bridge in Doncaster, however it was upgraded to an ABCL in 2025. The driver of the train is responsible for monitoring that the flashing white light is showing and that the crossing is clear before proceeding at up-to line speed over the crossing, if not the train should be brought to a stand before the crossing and the relevant rules followed before proceeding. Sometimes, mostly when the crossing is next to a station, the driver has to stop and operate a plunger (button) to start the crossing sequence. This type of crossing was initially popular as many crossings were destaffed reducing costs. However, after the 1986 Lockington level crossing accident and the Stott independent review of automatic open level crossings, many AOCLs were renewed as ABCLs. Since that time, a disproportionate number of accidents have occurred on the remaining AOCLs, leading to many having barriers added and changing the designation to AOCL+Bs. The first AOCL was installed at Yafforth, North Yorkshire in 1963.

=== AOCR – automatic open crossing remotely monitored ===
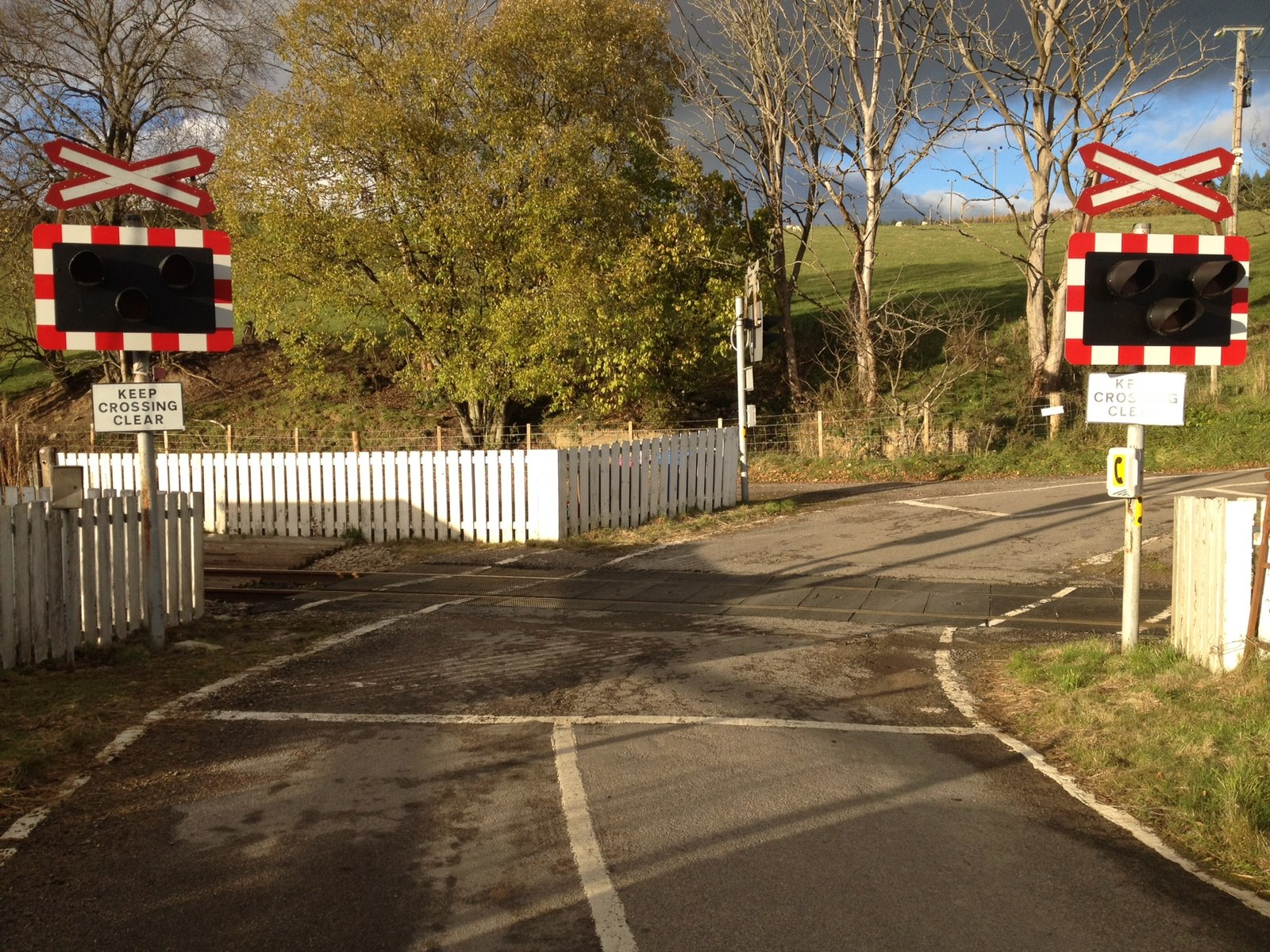
Rosarie AOCR level crossing, Speyside Glenlivet, Moray

These crossings were popularly installed when one was first trialled in 1983 (at Naas level crossing, near Lydney, Gloucestershire), because they lowered costs due to the lack of barriers, and they could be used on many country lanes. Acting in the same way as an AHBC, they do not interlock with signals, but they had a 75 miles per hour (121 km/h) line speed. After the Lockington rail crash in 1986, their demise began due to their safety issues, and now only one still exists on Network Rail at Rosarie in Scotland near Keith, Moray.

=== ABCL – automatic barrier crossing locally monitored ===
This type of crossings is a direct development of the AOCL which resulted after the Stott independent review of automatic open level crossing following the 1986 Lockington level crossing accident. They have a maximum line speed over the crossing of 55 miles per hour (89 km/h). Many AOCRs and AOCLs were subsequently renewed as ABCLs. The crossing initiation and operation of the Drivers Crossing Indicators is the same as the AOCL/AOCL+Bs. The first to be installed was on the A146 Beccles bypass, Suffolk, in 1988.

=== AOCL+B – automatic open crossing locally monitored plus barriers ===
These have existed since 2012, the first being at Ardrossan Harbour, North Ayrshire, and are the cheap version of the ABCL, brought about by RAIB suggesting Network Rail fit barriers to AOCLs after a crash at an AOCL in Halkirk, Highland. In an AOCL+B upgrade, the barriers are added into the AOCL's circuitry instead of replacing the whole system as at an ABCL upgrade. They can be recognised by the alarm switching off before the barriers rise once a train has passed, and by not having telephones as ABCLs do.

=== AFBCL – automatic full barrier crossing locally monitored ===
This is a recent type of crossing, the first being at Ardrossan Princes Street crossing in early 2018 and two more installed at Dingwall Middle and No.1 crossings in November 2018. These crossings are the enhanced version of the ABCL, with full barriers. This is intended for locally monitored crossings with a high level of misuse by pedestrians, or a risk of misuse. Obstacle detection equipment (LIDAR only) is provided since automatic full barrier crossings without them can trap a vehicle if not proven it's clear before lowering. The exit (offside) barriers will not descend unless the crossing is proved clear of vehicles and pedestrians by obstacle detection equipment. Unlike the standard full barrier type crossings, the alarms remain on when the barriers have completed their descent, just like any automatic half-barrier crossing, and will stay on until the red lights stop flashing.

=== TMOB – trainman operated crossing with barriers ===
On small branch lines (e.g. Cambrian Line), these crossings are common as they require no monitoring by any signallers, and simply have to be observed by the train driver as being closed. The guard will push a button close to the crossing that activates it, and once lowered the train can cross safely. These appear to be MCB-type crossings to the driver but have a much shorter closing time (with the drawback of the train having to stop completely to activate the crossing). Some crossings are provided with swinging gates instead of barriers. An example of these crossings is Eggesford Level Crossing near Eggesford Station, Devon

=== MWL/MSL – miniature warning light/miniature stop light crossing ===
These crossings are designed for use at foot crossings or private roads (where the user has to operate the barriers/gates themselves at the latter). A small set of red and green lights alert the user as to the state of the railway; green for safe to cross, red for stop – train approaching. These started to appear around 1964, and are still common today.

=== OC – open crossing ===
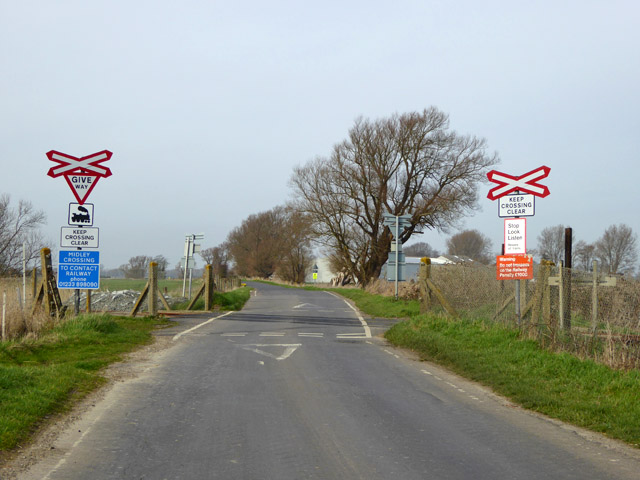
Midley open level crossing, on the Dungeness branch of the Marshlink Line.

St Andrew's Cross road sign used at open crossings.

Open crossings are only used on underused country lanes crossing lines with low and/or slow rail traffic. With a speed limit of 5 mph (8 km/h) to 10 mph (16 km/h) and no lights or barriers/gates, these are rare, and are only marked by the signage and the St Andrew's Cross. Whistle boards are provided on rail approaches to the crossing. Sometimes, a stop board may be provided requiring train drivers to stop and blow the whistle before proceeding. Many can be found in southern Kent on the Dungeness branch of the Marshlink Line. Others also scatter the country. As of 2024 the open crossings on the Looe Valley Line have been upgraded to AOCLs and ABCLs. Unusually, Terras level crossing used to have a STOP sign instead of a Give Way sign.

=== UWC – user worked crossing ===
The most common type of crossing on the railway network (around two-thirds of the total) and also the most basic type. These can either be a basic footpath crossing; a crossing with gates and instructional signage; or a crossing with a telephone to the nearest signalbox. In order to cross safely, users must read the instructions and comply with them. Whether they have to raise the barriers, open the gates, phone the signaller or simply cross under their own judgement varies depending on the danger the crossing poses. Normally phones are provided at crossings on high-speed lines.

=== Barrow crossing ===
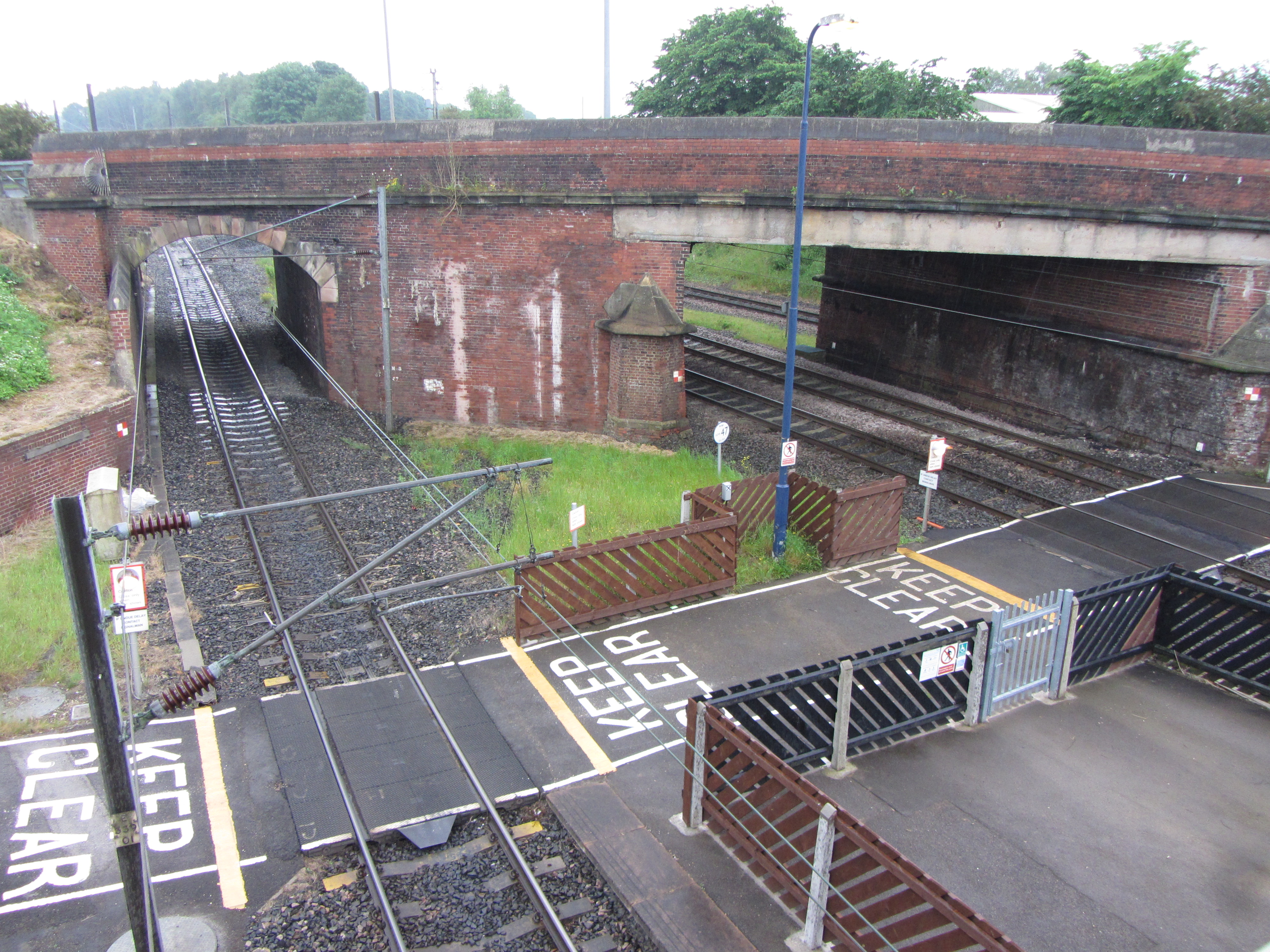
Barrow crossing at Thirsk station.

A barrow crossing is one found purely in railway stations which allows passengers, or other through users if it is a public right of way, the opportunity to cross between platforms. The name derives from the fact that it was used by station staff to carry the luggage of passengers across the tracks on barrows. Some barrow crossings are still in use at stations that do not have footbridges such as at Horton-in-Ribblesdale, Thirsk or at Abergavenny which does have a footbridge, but that footbridge is not accessible to wheelchair users. Some barrow crossings have a light display system of protection telling users when they can and cannot cross, or sometimes the station staff will accompany users.

== Equipment ==
Modern level crossings in Britain use a variety of different equipment to stop any traffic when an oncoming train crosses:

=== Warning lights ===
The modern warning lights used on level crossings in the UK consist of one amber light at the bottom and two red lights at the top, all on a black board with a checkerboard outline in red and white (the red and white borders weren't introduced until 1992; the borders were just white beforehand). The amber light has been in existence since the Hixon rail crash; previously there were just two red lights. The whole warning light module is known colloquially as a "wigwag" (due to the nature of the alternate flashes). They are also used at lifting and swing bridges, some airports, fire stations, police stations and ambulance stations in the UK.

When a level crossing activates, the yellow light is usually illuminated for three or five seconds and then the two red lights flash alternately for the duration of the closure. The lights are normally rectangular and landscape orientated, but where space is limited or to improve visibility special lights can be fitted that are portrait orientated. In some cases a non-standard traffic light type was fitted (still seen at Marshbrook, Minffordd and on the Isle of Man), consisting of the individual lights arranged vertically in a red–amber–red arrangement.

Many of the lights nowadays are LEDs because they are cheap, clear, and easy to maintain. The first LED wigwags were trialled at Bentley Heath level crossing in 2006 but not fully adapted until July 2007. Incandescent halogen lights are no longer manufactured as they are wasteful on electricity and can cause accidents such as at Beech Hill Crossing in Nottinghamshire, in which a fatality occurred due to the lights' dimness in the low sunlight. However old halogen lights and even LED lights are sometimes donated to heritage railways and used at their crossings, or simply scrapped in the case of some halogen lights. Some trainspotters try to collect these old lights for preservation.

As well as road traffic, smaller pedestrian lights are used in populous areas or at dangerous crossings, where extra warning is needed. These consist of a flashing red silhouette of a pedestrian, similar to what users would see at a road pedestrian crossing.

Some AOCL(+B) crossings with two tracks very occasionally have an 'Another Train Coming' warning light, a small red light with the overlay 'Another Train Coming' that flashes when two trains are approaching. Historically, at twin-track AHBCs, there was an 'Another Train Coming' neon sign that would flash when another train was approaching. Since the early 1980s, most of these have been removed and replaced with simpler signage, but they weren't fully extinct until around 2007/2008 (Beech Hill LC being one of the last with the illuminated 'another train coming' sign).

=== Audible alarms ===
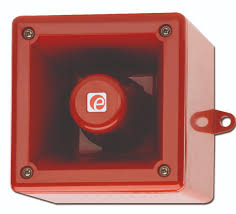
E2S type A105NAX alarm

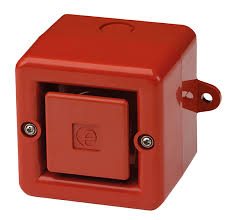
The E2S A100 alarm that heritage railways use, with only some Network Rail crossings too, like one in Keadby, North Lincolnshire.

Originally electrical bells were used at many crossings to produce a loud ringing alarm when the crossing was activated, and stopped when the barriers descended. This could either be a single-stroke bell that would ding once or twice a second, or a multi-stroke constantly ringing bell. These bells became normal practice until audible tone alarms started to be installed, replacing the ageing bells. Bells on some crossings can still be seen today although some are not as audible as today's standards. One example is Cross Lane in Collingham, Nottinghamshire, but this crossing might be closed soon. They can come attached to the post that the warning lights are on, or can come fitted to some older barrier pedestals.

Audible alarms were first implemented on crossings in the late 1970s/early 1980s and continue to be used today as they are the safest way of warning traffic and pedestrians audibly of an approaching train. The Yodalarms (depending on what model) usually have different tones, alternate rates and different volumes (controlled by potentiometers) at different crossings, depending on how busy the crossing is, and whether residents are living nearby. In the late 2000s, Network Rail introduced the use of E2S alarms (A105N-NR), which when a second train is approaching will increase the speed of the tone and play a voice message twice "Warning another train is approaching". Modern alarms have night modes (controlled by the crossing relays) that lower the volume in the night by reducing the voltage, the pitch usually goes lower and the alternate rate normally goes faster (depending on which yodalarm model it is), on some crossings (mainly of the older types, like ones that had bells) the alarms are switched off completely by the crossing controller at night. The alarm sounds from the moment the amber light is illuminated up to the point the barriers shut on a full barrier crossing, and the crossing is deactivated on all automatic crossings (some older AHBC crossings have their alarms shut off once the barriers are down, like at the Moorends crossing in Thorne, Doncaster). The Yodalarm YO3 Electronic Alarm (Clifford & Snell) type alarms were the original ones used and still are the most common. They produce a two tone (high pitch bleep, followed by a lower pitched bleep) alarm, that does tend to change over time due to general wear. They are found at almost every MCB crossing in Britain, and many more besides. At crossings with half barriers and two tracks, if another train is approaching after a first has crossed, the alarm will increase in speed to inform the users at the crossing that another train is due. The E2S alarms are common at AHBs, and produce a more lower pitch assertive two tone sound. These alarms function the same as a Yodalarm at a half barrier crossing except their main property is that intermittently a verbal warning will play. This can either be "Warning, more than one train may be approaching" repeated twice during closure, or "Warning, another train is approaching" repeated twice if another train is due. They can be set to play just the second message or play both. Some crossings with equipment manufactured by Bombardier and Schweizer Electronic use a PA system instead of separate alarm units and play an audio file of the Yodalarm alternating signal. Some also play voice messages similar to the E2S signal in which "Warning, another train may be approaching" is repeated. In heritage railways, some crossings use fire alarms instead of E2S A105N-NR or Yodalarms, these special alarms are the A100 alarm also manufactured by E2S. One can be found however at the footpath crossing over the Keadby sliding railway bridge.

=== Gates and barriers ===
Wooden hand gates were the most common form of protecting level crossings in the UK, and were operated either by a signalman or a crossing keeper. All gated crossings across public highways had each gate fitted with a large red circle or more rarely, a diamond, to highlight that the gate was closed. Gates open to road traffic, mostly closed across the railway to stop herded livestock from straying onto the track. If a train was due, the gates would be swung manually or by a wheel mechanism from the adjacent signal box. When closed to road traffic, the gates would be interlocked with the signalling systems, locking the gates from opening and releasing the signals. These legacy crossings do not meet current standards and many have been renewed with modern systems. However, there are still a few on Network Rail and also on heritage lines. A system of motor-driven boom-gates replaced some older gates, they had a motorised wheel that drove the gate across the road. These have all been replaced due to reliability issues, most notable at Redcar.

Barriers are the normal level crossing protector to be seen in the UK and now come in various models. All barriers at crossings are illuminated with barrier lights on the barrier arm, and are highlighted using red and white adhesive-backed vinyl. Half barriers at level crossings are a simple boom arm that descends on the left-hand footway and left-hand lanes of a road when the crossing activates and the warning lights have been on for about 8-10 seconds. Full barrier crossings have either two barriers covering the whole width of the road on either side, or four barriers covering half of the road on either side, that descend on the left-hand lanes first and then the right-hand lanes. These are supplied with a white skirting (red and white on older "GWE" barriers) that fold up in the upright position and stops small children, animals, and potential trespassers from crossing when the barriers are down. Plastic skirts replaced metal skirts with the introduction of Smiths barriers in 1985. Where pedestrian traffic is sparse or there is a barrier separating the footway from the road, only partial or no skirting ('skirts') may be used. In rare cases, both full and half barrier crossings can have three barriers that all descend at once. Examples include Britannia crossing in Kingswear, Devon, or the AHB crossing in Harlech, Gwynedd.

Some early motor/gearbox driven and electro/hydraulic pedestals/barriers were made by Godwin Warren Engineering (GWE). The now-extinct GWE Mk1 pedestal/barriers were installed at manned controlled barrier (MCB) crossings between the late 1960s to the early 1980s, with the last ones removed in Selby, North Yorkshire in 2021. The Mk1 pedestals/barrier booms are recognised by the complex clamping arrangement on the pedestal sidearm which hold the aluminium booms and by the pogo-stick fitted to the end of the barrier used to support it in the down position. BR Western Region barriers were also installed at around the same time as the GWE barriers, these were hydraulically powered. Some were much longer than current electro/hydraulic barriers, but the hydraulics were hard to maintain and had noisy hydraulic pump motors. Both these legacy crossing systems has been targeted for renewal in recent years and few examples are now left. The standard pedestals/barriers used since the early 1980s are the Mk2 (BR843 specification) type. These were originally made by GWE and later by 'Smiths Industries Hydraulics Company' in 1985, who were re-branded 'SPX Fluid Power' in 2001, and re-branded again to their current name 'SPX Rail Systems' (as of 2005). In 2024 SPXFlow sold their brand 'Rail Systems' to Hydraulic Technologies who now manufactuer the barriers but still use the same design as 'SPX Rail Systems'. Barriers that have been produced by Hydraulic Technologies show stickers on the barrier weights with their logo however the identification plate on the front of the barrier box still is branded as 'SPX Rail Systems'. The barrier booms are of aluminium and have a simple two bolt fixing which is designed to easily separate without damage should the barrier be hit and can alert the signaller via use of a proximity switch on the sidearm of the barrier. The booms descend by gravity and raise using an electro/hydraulic power pack mounted in the pedestal.

As well as these, as mentioned in the first paragraph, the troublesome gates at Redcar were replaced in 2015 with a new, exclusive telescopic sliding gate that slides across the road when a train is due. These were fitted with modern red and white reflective stripes as well as the red circle warning as seen on gates almost 100 years ago. The gates were implemented as a trial, though after two years they also experienced a failure.

Finally, the most recent tests of not only barriers but barrier system was undertaken at Selby Road level crossing near Doncaster in April 2018. These were Bombardier's EBI Gate 2000 barriers (also called the EBI Gate 630) which were used alongside the Bombardier EBI Gate 2000 system. These have barrier arms that are safer in the event of them being hit, as they break in set places. They also have supporter pogo-sticks at the end of the barrier as did the GWE barriers beforehand. Several more of these crossings have been fitted in the north east, and improved versions fitted in Surrey in 2025.

=== Telephones ===
In the aftermath of the Hixon level crossing accident, the inquiry emphasised a need to both provide telephones at automatic level crossings, and to strengthen traffic signage and rules to make it unambiguous to road users who needed to call the signaler for permission before crossing. Plessey introduced a phone system in 1970 that enabled widespread introduction and standardisation of level crossing telephones. The design of the system enabled road users to call a signaler, the signaler to call the crossing, detect faults and notify the signaler if the fault has been corrected and distinguish between calls from the different phones (Note: Emergency telephone versus roadside or barrier telephones.) at the crossing.

Crossing phones were classified into three types: barrier, roadside and emergency. Roadside phones were located on the approach of crossings, intended for drivers who required to request permission to cross, such as long, slow or heavy vehicles or people with livestock. Barrier phones were located on the left-hand side of crossings, either beside or integrated into a level crossing barrier housing and typically intended for use by railway staff servicing equipment. Emergency phones are located on the right side of the roadway, intended for members of the public who need to report an emergency to signalers. In the 1980s, the advanced roadside phone was phased out and the distinction between 'emergency' calls and other calls was phased out. The telephone in the signal box for the signaler was a GPO telephone Type 710 with no dial, and two lamp buttons, one red (call) and one red (fault). A separate case held the bell and buzzer equipment that sounded when a call was initiated from the crossing. In 1986, British Rail commissioned Whiteley Electronics of Mansfield to improve upon and supersede the system by Plessey, which was limited in the ability to indicate fault states and required relays that were becoming harder to maintain. This led to the development of the Public Emergency Telephone System (PETS).

== Gallery ==
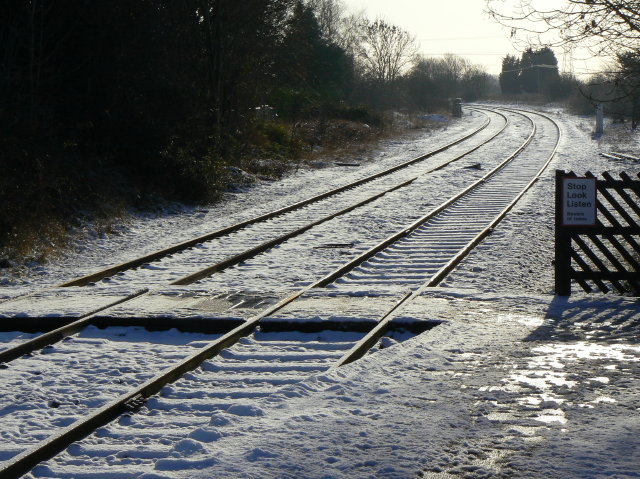
Barrow Crossing across the railway at Ruskington

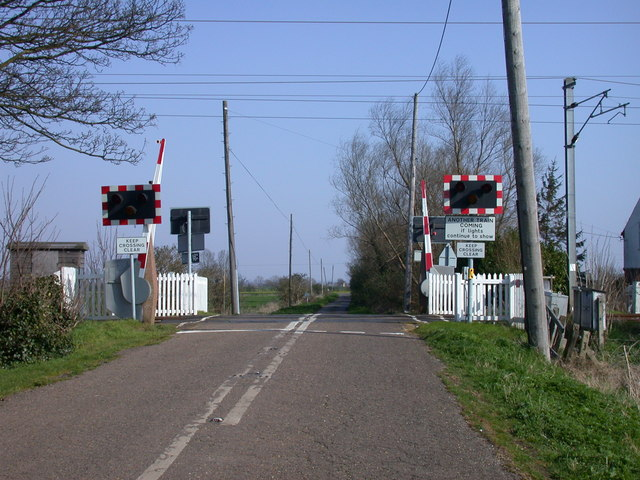
A half-barrier level crossing known as an AHBC near Waterbeach, Cambridgeshire

Risk of grounding warning sign

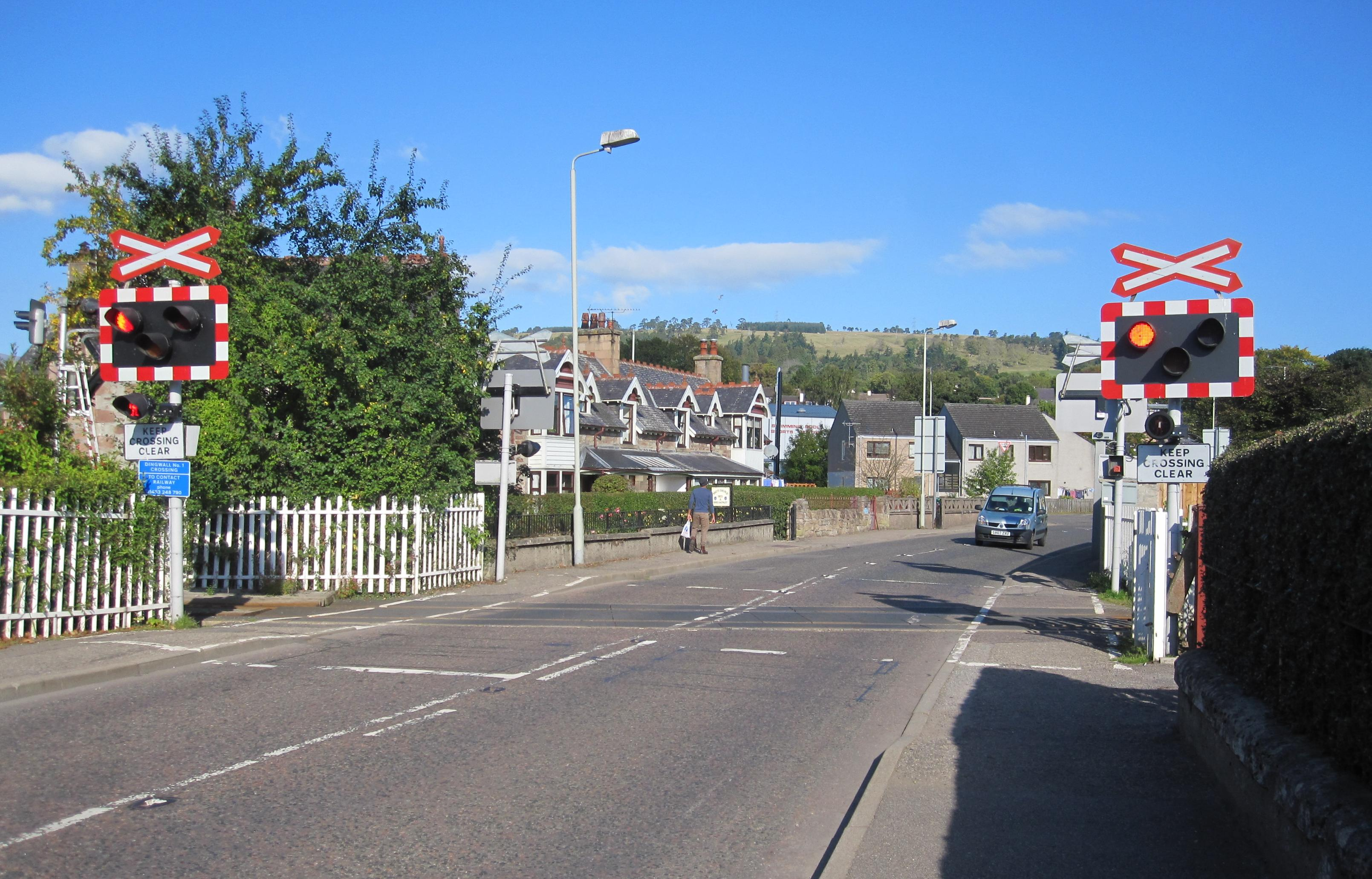
An open level crossing with warning lights and signs known as an AOCL in Dingwall, Highland. Now an AFBCL.

Electrified overhead cables warning sign

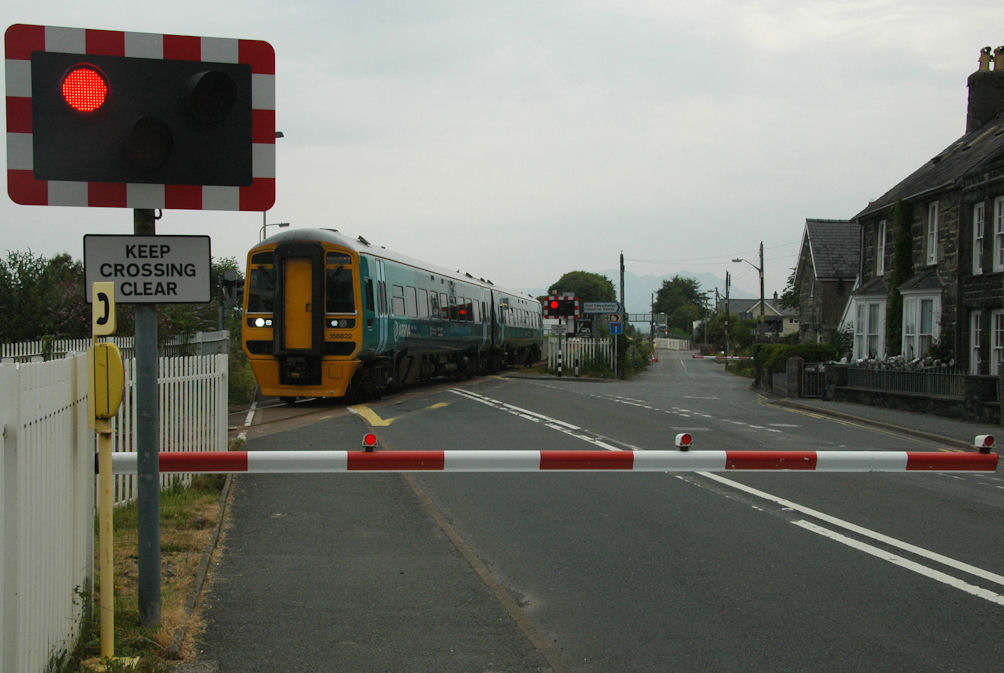
An ABCL crossing at Harlech, Gwynedd. This crossing is unique for having three barriers.

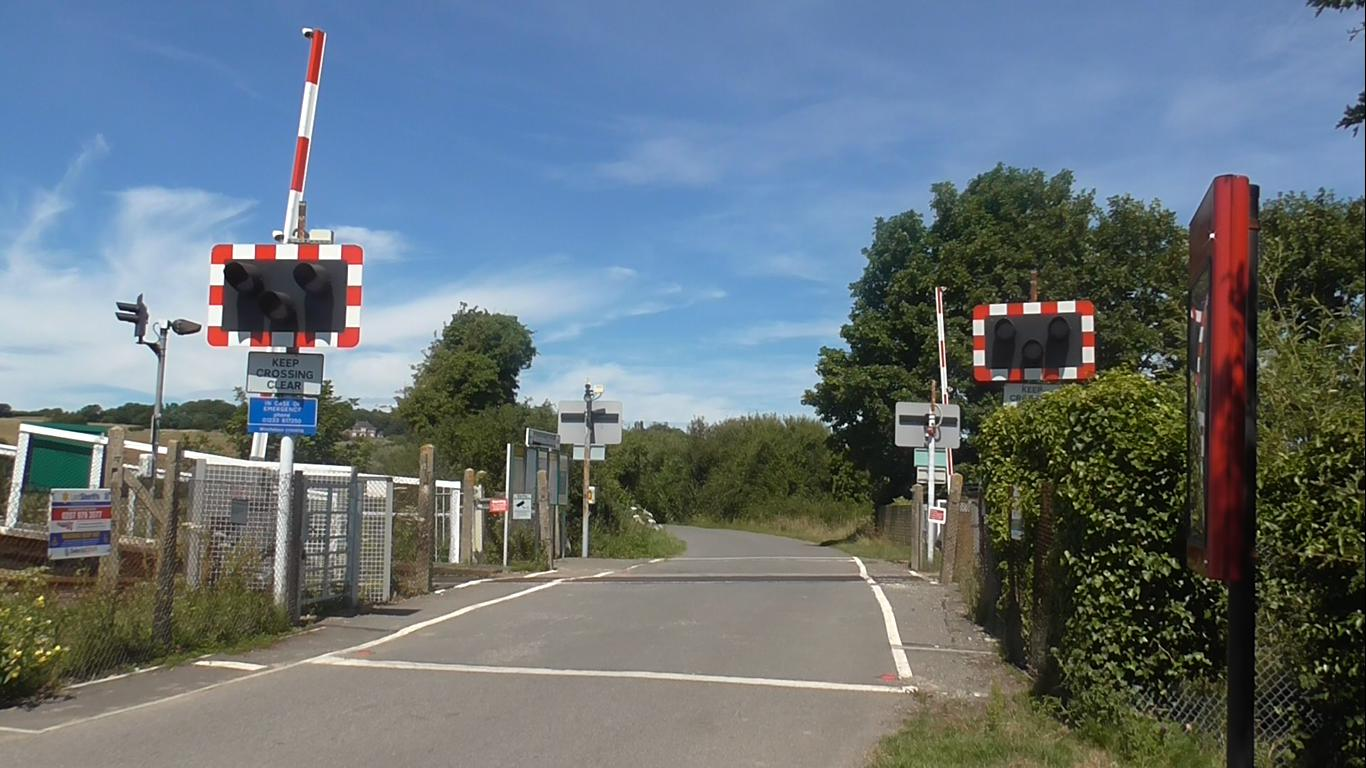
The AOCL+B crossing at Winchelsea, East Sussex, with no telephone or AHBC signage

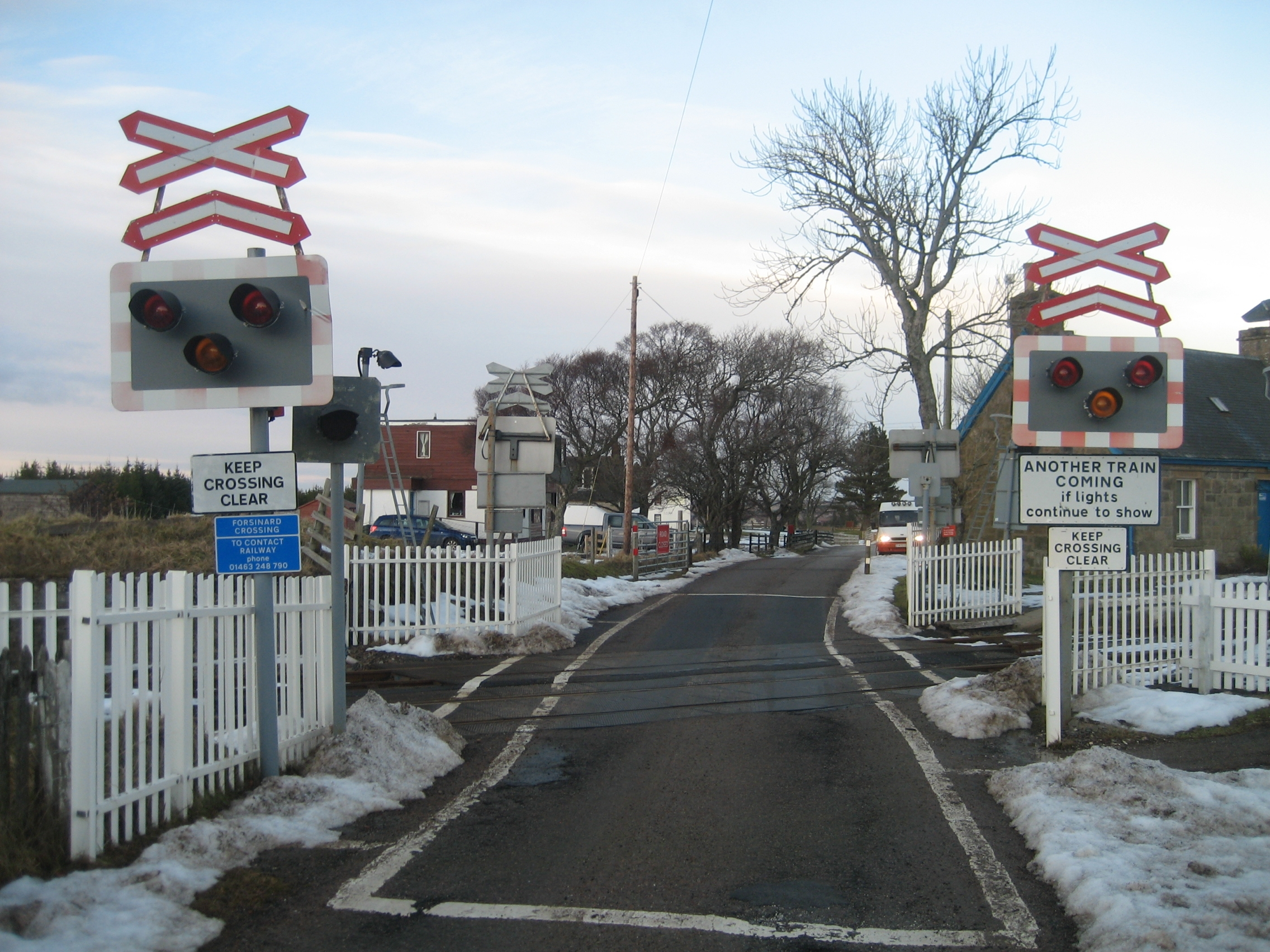
A two-track AOCL (now AOCL+B) at Forsinard, Highland. Note the boomerang-shaped St Andrew's Cross to signify the double-tracked line (now defunct signage)

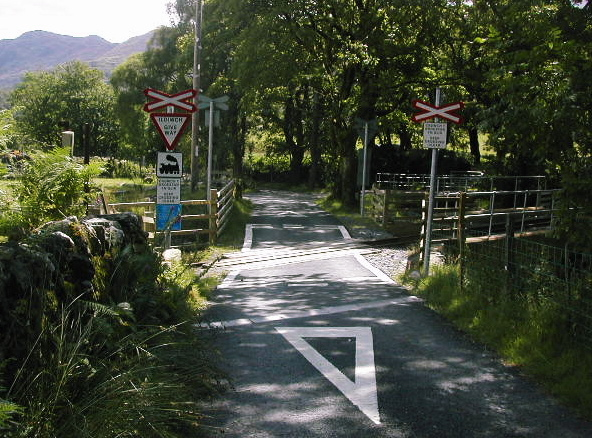
An open crossing on a narrow gauge heritage railway in Beddgelert, Gwynedd, with bilingual warning signage

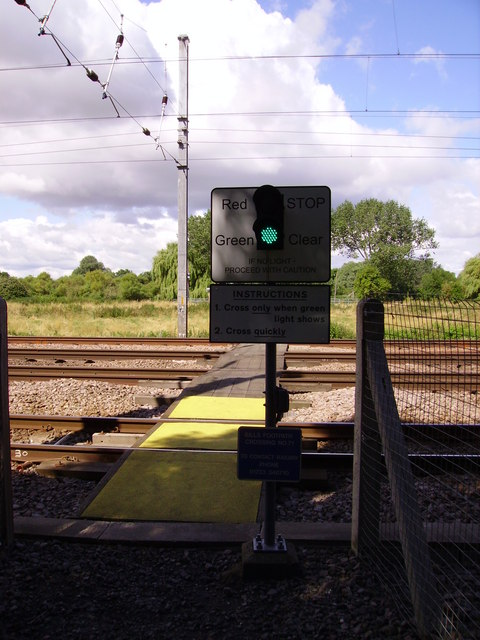
The red and green stop light at an MWL foot crossing near Offord Cluny, Cambridgeshire. This is a major crossing across the high speed East Coast Main Line

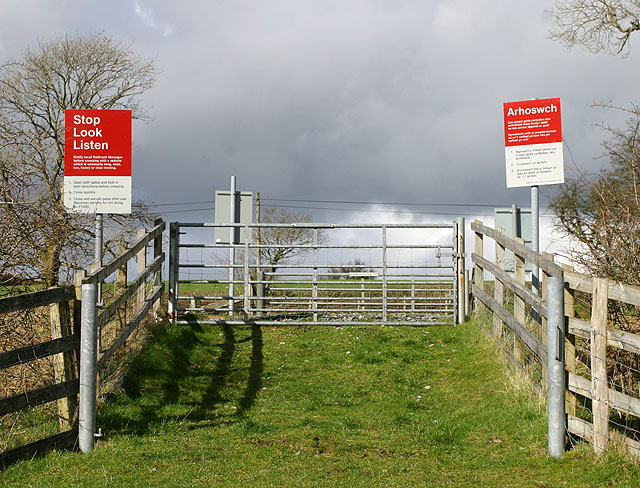
A simple farm crossing across a low traffic line near Llanwrtyd Wells, Powys. These crossings are the most common and require complete user compliance.

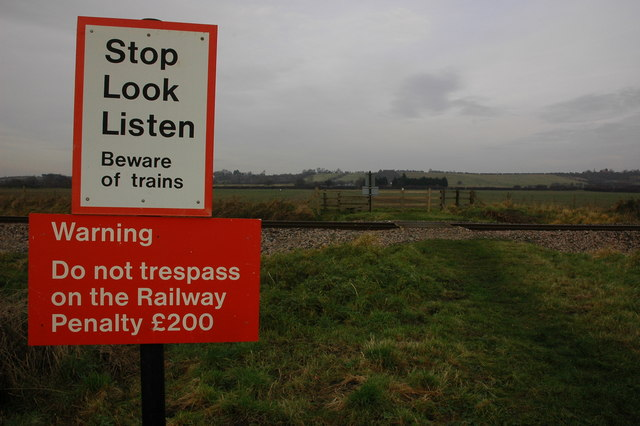
A basic footpath crossing near Fladbury, Worcestershire, with very simple signage

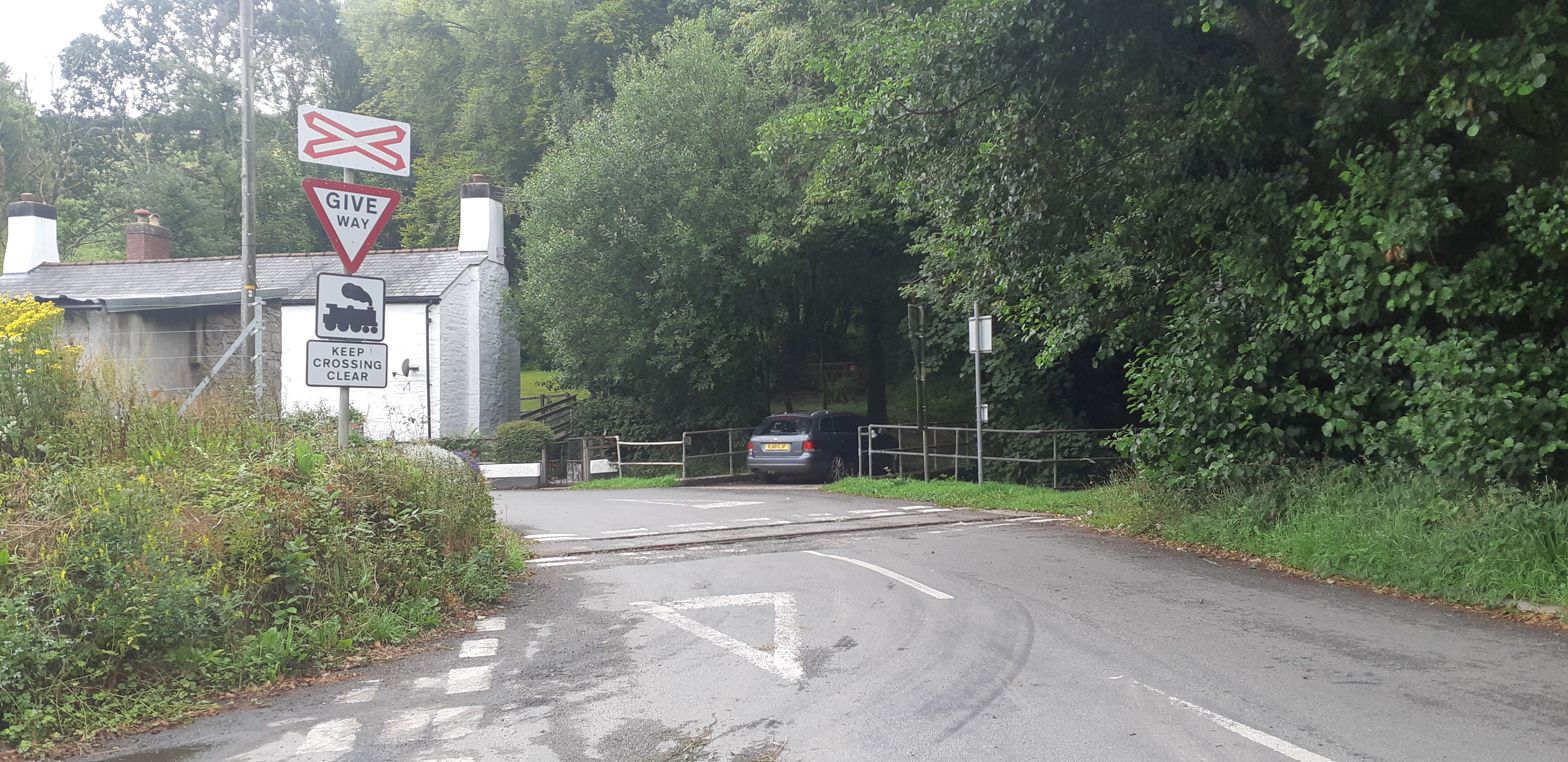
A simple open crossing on Moorswater Industrial Estate, Cornwall, with basic signage. This crossing is very rarely used.

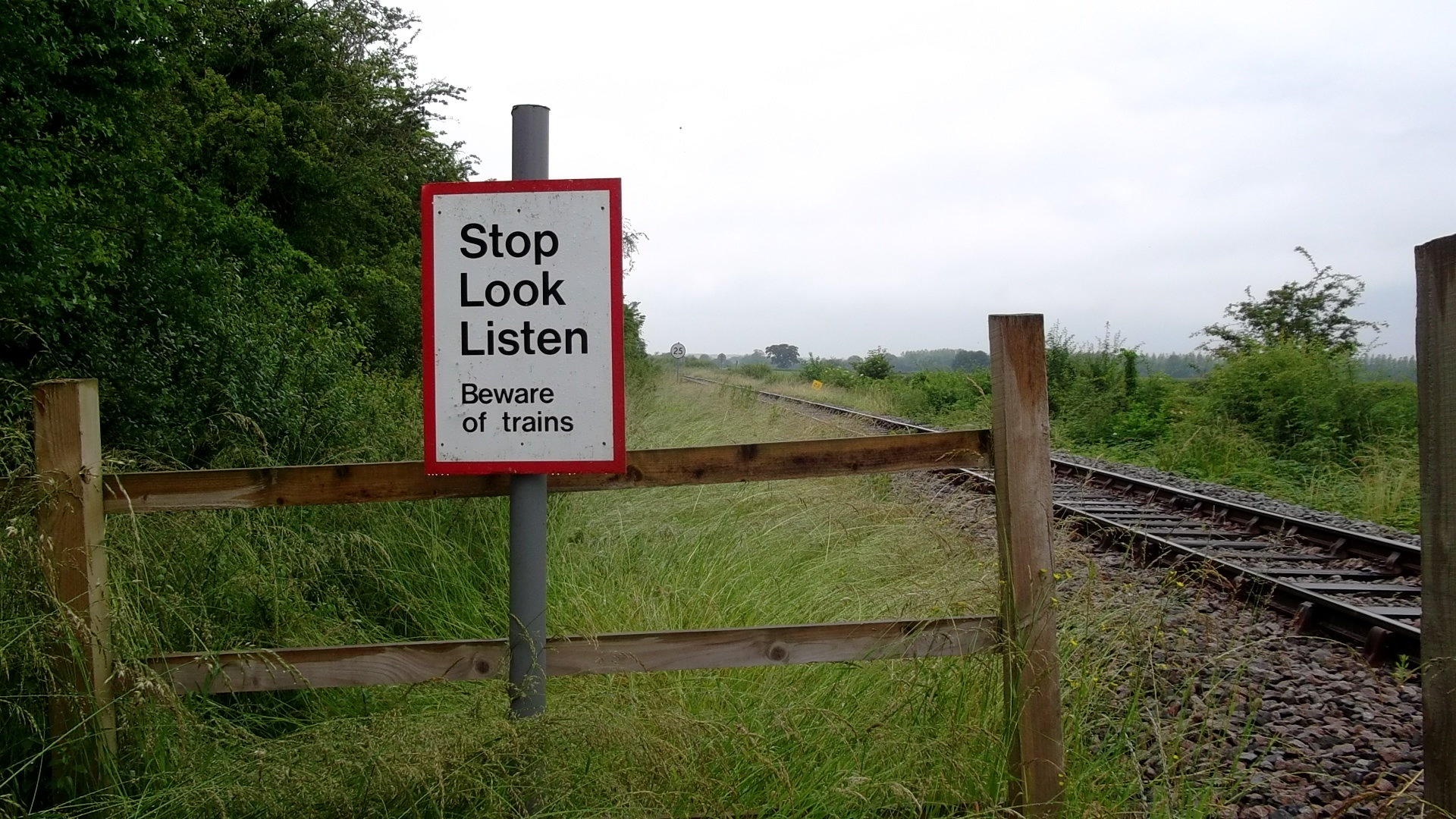
Stop Look Listen Beware of Trains sign near Fenny Compton Junction. This crossing is a foot crossing, one of the most common in the United Kingdom

== See also ==
- Anti-trespass panels, British invention used to deter pedestrians from using crossings to enter tracks
- Level crossing
