= Thorpe, East Riding of Yorkshire =

Hamlet in Lockington, East Riding of Yorkshire, England

Coordinates: 53.908016°N 0.488629°W

Thorpe
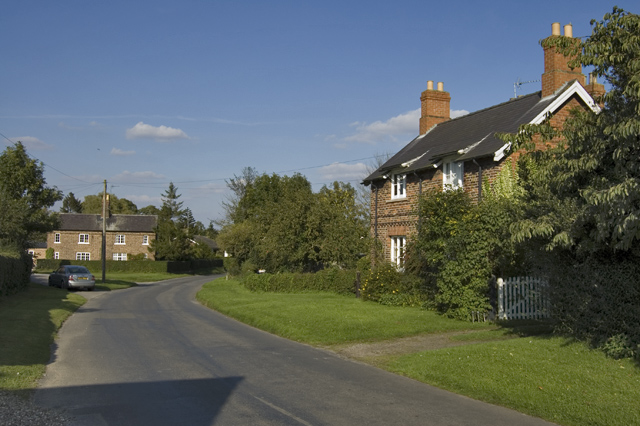
- Thorpe hamlet

- Location within the East Riding of Yorkshire
- OS grid reference: SE993468
- Civil parish: Lockington
- Unitary authority: East Riding of Yorkshire
- Ceremonial county: East Riding of Yorkshire
- Region: Yorkshire and the Humber
- Country: England
- Sovereign state: United Kingdom
- Post town: DRIFFIELD
- Postcode district: YO25
- Dialling code: 01430
- Police: Humberside
- Fire: Humberside
- Ambulance: Yorkshire
- UK Parliament: Beverley and Holderness

Thorpe is a hamlet in the East Riding of Yorkshire, England. It is situated approximately 3.5 miles (5.6 km) south-east of the village of Middleton on the Wolds and 2.5 miles (4 km) north-west of the village of Leconfield.

It forms part of the civil parish of Lockington.
