= Bainton Gate railway station =

Disused railway station in Bainton, Peterborough

Coordinates: 52.64524°N 0.38598°W

Bainton Gate

General information
- Location: Bainton, Peterborough; England
- Grid reference: TF093065

Other information
- Status: Disused

History
- Pre-grouping: Midland Railway

Key dates
- 2 October 1846: Opened
- 1 August 1856: Closed
Location

Bainton Gate railway station was a short lived railway "station" in the Soke of Peterborough (now in Cambridgeshire) on the Syston and Peterborough Railway serving the village of Bainton. It was located at the level crossing on the Bainton to Tallington road. The crossing keeper's cottage survives and is now a private house. According to The Syston and Peterborough website, this cottage doubled as the station building. The station closed on 1 August 1856.

Preceding station	Historical railways	Following station
Uffington & Barnack	Midland Railway; Leicester to Peterborough	Helpston
