= Helpston railway station =

Railway station in Cambridgeshire, England

Coordinates: 52.6360°N 0.3307°W

Helpston
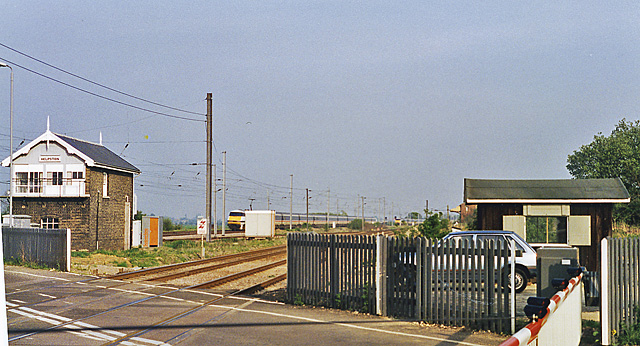
- Remains of the station in 1995

General information
- Location: Helpston, City of Peterborough; England
- Grid reference: TF131055
- Platforms: 2

Other information
- Status: Disused

History
- Pre-grouping: Midland Railway
- Post-grouping: London, Midland and Scottish Railway; Eastern Region of British Railways

Key dates
- 2 October 1846: Opened as Helpstone
- 1 July 1858: Renamed Helpstone for Market Deeping
- 1 May 1877: Renamed Helpston for Market Deeping
- 1 May 1912: Renamed Helpston
- 6 June 1966: Closed
Location

Helpston railway station was a station in Helpston, Cambridgeshire, on the Midland Railway's Syston and Peterborough Railway. It was closed in 1966. The Great Northern Railway main line runs adjacent to the Midland Railway at this point, but the Great Northern never had a station in Helpston. This was due to an agreement whereby the Midland carried materials to the site during construction of the Great Northern, and in return the Great Northern offered no competition for services on this section.

The goods shed survives, as does the Great Northern Railway signal box, which is now used only to monitor a number of level crossings in the vicinity.

== Helpston level crossing ==
Helpston level crossing itself carries the Helpston to Glinton road over the four tracks of the ex-GNR line and the two tracks of the ex-MR line. This was previously two separate level crossings, controlled by two separate signal boxes. There was space for two cars between the level crossings. The crossings were merged and converted from gates to full barriers in the 1970s.

Out of all level crossings in the United Kingdom, this has the longest stretch of road between the barriers, crossing six tracks (grouped as four tracks of the 125 mph East Coast Mainline, and two tracks of the Birmingham–Peterborough line). As of January 2021, the crossing was assessed to have a "very high" collective risk rating.

In 2015, Network Rail proposed to close 73 level crossings between Doncaster and London, including the Helpston level crossing. This was part of a larger initiative started in 2010. However, later the same year, Network Rail backtracked on the programme.

Preceding station	Historical railways	Following station
Bainton Gate	Midland Railway; Leicester to Peterborough	Walton
