= Lockington railway station =

Disused railway station in the East Riding of Yorkshire, England

Lockington
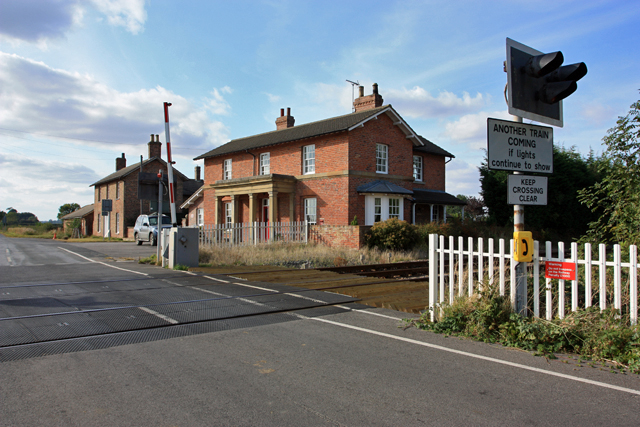
- Station and level crossing in 2009

General information
- Location: Lockington, East Riding of Yorkshire; England
- Coordinates: 53.908400°N 0.438000°W
- Grid reference: TA026469
- Platforms: 2

Other information
- Status: Disused

History
- Original company: York and North Midland Railway
- Pre-grouping: North Eastern Railway
- Post-grouping: London and North Eastern Railway

Key dates
- 6 October 1846: opened
- 13 June 1960: closed
Location

Lockington railway station was a minor station serving the village of Lockington, East Riding of Yorkshire, England. It was on the Hull to Scarborough Line and was opened on 6 October 1846 by the York and North Midland Railway. It closed on 13 June 1960.

In 1986, the Lockington rail crash, a serious collision on the level crossing by the station causing eight deaths and several injuries.

The station building, which was designed by George Townsend Andrews, was given Grade II listed building status in 1987.

Preceding station	Historical railways	Following station
Arram	Y&NMR; Hull and Scarborough Line	Hutton Cranswick

== See also ==
- Lockington rail crash
- Listed buildings in Lockington, East Riding of Yorkshire
