= Lockington, East Riding of Yorkshire =

Village and civil parish in the East Riding of Yorkshire, England

Coordinates: 53°54′45″N 0°29′10″W

Lockington
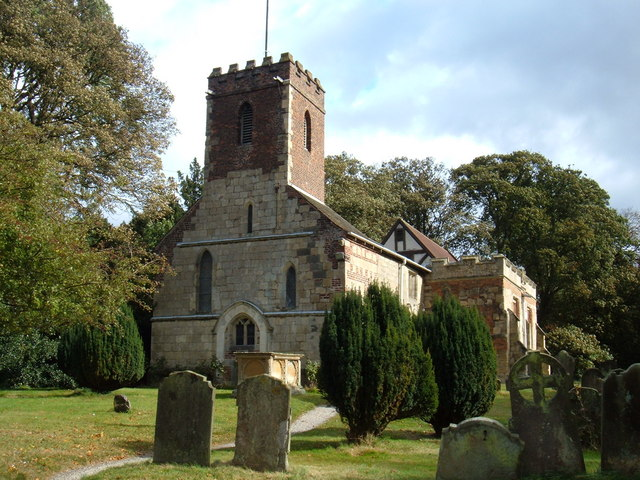
- St Mary’s Church, Lockington

- Location within the East Riding of Yorkshire
- Population: 524 (2011 census)
- OS grid reference: SE995475
  - London: 165 mi (266 km) S
- Civil parish: Lockington
- Unitary authority: East Riding of Yorkshire
- Ceremonial county: East Riding of Yorkshire
- Region: Yorkshire and the Humber
- Country: England
- Sovereign state: United Kingdom
- Post town: DRIFFIELD
- Postcode district: YO25
- Dialling code: 01430
- Police: Humberside
- Fire: Humberside
- Ambulance: Yorkshire
- UK Parliament: Beverley and Holderness

Lockington is a small village and civil parish in the East Riding of Yorkshire, England. It is situated approximately 6 miles (10 km) north-west of Beverley town centre.

The civil parish is formed by the villages of Lockington and Aike and the hamlet of Thorpe. According to the 2011 UK census the population of Lockington parish was 524, a decrease on the 2001 UK census figure of 542. There were 247 separate households. However, since this census, recent housing developments have occurred.

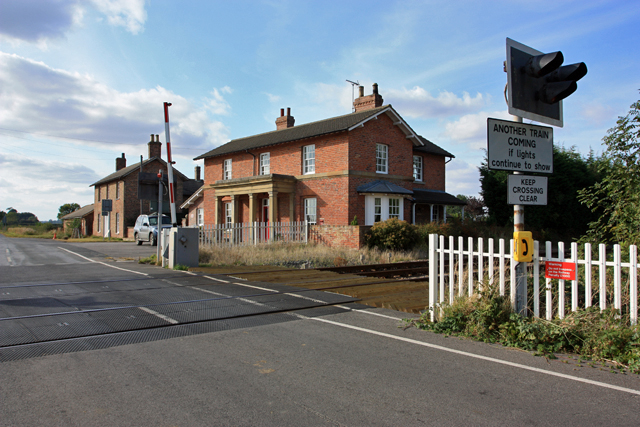
Old Railway station site

The name Lockington probably derives from the Old English Locaingtūn meaning 'settlement connected with Loca', or 'settlement of/at the enclosure'.

The Anglican St Mary's Church, Lockington is a Grade I listed building.

The A164 road and the Yorkshire Coast railway line from Hull to Scarborough both pass through the parish. Until 13 June 1960 Lockington railway station operated on the line. The level crossing adjacent to the station was the scene of a fatal accident on 26 July 1986.

In 1823 Lockington was in the civil parish of Lockington and of Kilnwick, in the Wapentake of Harthill. A National School existed in the village. Population was 491, with occupations including thirteen farmers, two carpenters, two shoemakers, a blacksmith, a tailor, a bricklayer, a corn miller, and the landlord of The Buck public house. Residents included the parish clerk, a schoolmaster, and a gentleman. A carrier operated between the village and Hull and Beverley once a week.

== See also ==
- Listed buildings in Lockington, East Riding of Yorkshire
