= Bainton, Cambridgeshire =

Village in Cambridgeshire, England

Coordinates: 52.6450°N 0.3828°W

Bainton
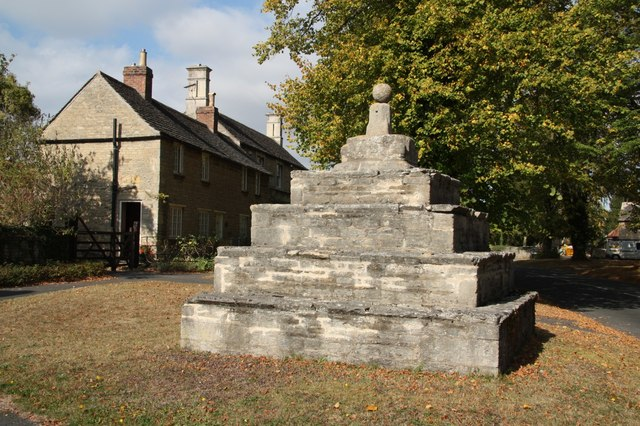
- Bainton village cross

- Location within Cambridgeshire
- Population: 290
- OS grid reference: TF094060
- Unitary authority: Peterborough
- Ceremonial county: Cambridgeshire
- Region: East
- Country: England
- Sovereign state: United Kingdom
- Post town: Stamford
- Postcode district: PE9
- Dialling code: 01780
- Police: Cambridgeshire
- Fire: Cambridgeshire
- Ambulance: East of England
- UK Parliament: North West Cambridgeshire

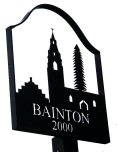
Village sign in Bainton

Bainton is a village and civil parish in the Peterborough unitary authority area of Cambridgeshire, England. Bainton is on the southern edge of the Welland valley and lies 7.4 miles (11.9 km) north-west of Peterborough and 4 miles (6.4 km) east of Stamford. Ashton is a neighbouring hamlet and lies approximately 1 mile (1.6 km) south-east of Bainton within the same civil parish. At the time of the 2001 census, the parish's population was 305 people by the 2011 census the parish's population was 290 people and by the 2021 census the parish's population was 330 people.

== History ==
Formerly known as 'Badingtun' (Old English meaning "estate associated with a man called Bada"), some form of settlement existed in c. 980 but was not mentioned in the Domesday Book of 1086.

At the south-east of the parish of Bainton and adjacent to the nearby village of Helpston is the site of Torpel Manor which is a series of medieval and later earthworks that are a Scheduled Ancient Monument.

The medieval village cross called the Butter Cross is Grade I listed, as is the parish church. The church of St Mary dates back to the early 13th century, with additions such as the tower and spire which are 14th century. The church includes a monument by Sir Richard Westmacott to Mary Henson who died in 1805. The bell tower contains four bells but these are not able to be rung currently.

Bainton House used to be the home of the Birkbeck family and is a Grade II listed manor house dating back to the 16th century.

== Transport ==
Bainton lies on the B1443.

To the north of Bainton, the Bainton Gate railway station briefly served the village between 1846 and its closure in 1856. The nearest railway station is at Stamford 4 miles (6.4 km) to the west.
