= Spath =

Village in Staffordshire, England

Coordinates: 52.915°N 1.873°W

- Location within Staffordshire
- OS grid reference: SK085352
- Civil parish: Uttoxeter Rural
- District: East Staffordshire
- Shire county: Staffordshire
- Region: West Midlands
- Country: England
- Sovereign state: United Kingdom
- Post town: UTTOXETER
- Postcode district: ST14
- Dialling code: 01889
- Police: Staffordshire
- Fire: Staffordshire
- Ambulance: West Midlands
- UK Parliament: Burton and Uttoxeter

Spath is a small village located 0.3 miles (0.48 km) north of Uttoxeter, Staffordshire, England. The village is on the River Tean and is separated from Uttoxeter by the A50 road.

== History ==
In UK railway history, Spath was on the now disused Churnet Valley Line, owned and operated by North Staffordshire Railway. The village is notable as the site of the first automatic half barrier crossing in the United Kingdom, which came into operation on 5 February 1961. The railway closed four years later and the road which crossed it via the automatic crossing is now gated. There is no remaining visible sign of the crossing.

Spath was the original home of the Stevensons of Uttoxeter bus company.
