= Lockington rail accident =

1986 derailment in the East Riding of Yorkshire, England

Lockington rail crash

Details
- Date: 26 July 1986; 10:00
- Location: Lockington, Humberside
- Coordinates: 53.90820°N 0.43919°W
- Country: England
- Line: Hull to Bridlington Line
- Operator: British Rail
- Cause: Vehicle incursion (level crossing)

Statistics
- Trains: 1
- Deaths: 9
- Injured: 59, 10 requiring further treatment

In Lockington, England on 26 July 1986, the 09:33 passenger train from Bridlington to Kingston upon Hull on the Hull to Scarborough Line struck a passenger van on a level crossing.

Eight passengers on the train and a passenger in the van died.

== Description ==
On 26 July 1986 the 09:33 Bridlington to Hull train, travelling at around 50 miles per hour (80 km/h), struck a van at Lockington Level Crossing at around 10:00, causing the train to derail. The train was made up of two Diesel multiple units: a two-car Class 105 coupled to a two-car Class 114. The derailed train ran down the railway embankment and the front vehicle jackknifed and fell onto its side. The van was torn into five pieces.

Eight train passengers and a passenger in the van were killed. 59 people were taken to hospital, of whom 10 required further treatment.

It is thought that the derailment was caused by one side of the bogie colliding with the van, followed by a wheel in the trailing bogie of the front carriage striking trackwork that had been damaged by the force of the initial derailment, causing the train to jump and the first carriage to separate from the trailing bogie. The front coach left the railway line and ran into a field, embedding itself, causing the rear of the coach to be pushed around by the rest of the train, causing it to fall on one side, and be turned around 180 degrees.

The level crossing was an automatic type using flashing warning lights (an AOCR – automatic open crossing, remotely monitored), which had been installed in 1985/86 replacing lifting barriers operated from the adjacent signal box.

There had been reported examples of the warning lights operating incorrectly before the accident, including the lights failing to activate or activating without enough warning time. The investigation concluded that the lights did operate correctly on the day of the accident. The driver of the van could not recall the incident; the evidence showed that the van was moving when struck, as the van was in gear. He was local to the area and a driver of over two decades experience, and was aware of the mode of operation of the crossing. The investigator concluded that on balance of probability the driver had been distracted before the crossing, causing him to miss the light signal. A significant factor was that he had just pulled out of the cottages adjacent to the crossing and thus did not have the long period of visibility of the red flashing lights that other road users would experience.

The line re-opened on 29 July 1986.

An inquest held on 25 February 1987 recorded that the persons involved in the accident died of misadventure.

== Legacy ==
Following the accident, the UK Government commissioned a comprehensive review of safety at automatic open level crossings, which reported in 1987.

In 2009 a campaign was launched to have a permanent memorial erected. On 25 July 2010 a memorial was unveiled in Driffield Memorial Garden, with over 100 people attending the service.

A book about the disaster was published by Bridlington disaster author expert, Richard Jones, in September 2010.

A ceremony was held on 24 July 2011 at the memorial for the 25th anniversary of the crash.

== See also ==
- Hixon rail crash, Ufton Nervet rail crash level crossing train crashes
- Selby rail crash
- Lockington railway station
- Dalfsen train crash in the Netherlands, 2016.
