= List of churches in Peterborough =

The following is a list of churches in the unitary authority of Peterborough

== Active churches ==
The unitary authority has an estimated 84 active churches for 197,100 inhabitants, a ratio of one church to every 2,346 people.

There are no active churches in the civil parishes of Borough Fen, Deeping Gate, Southorpe, St Martin's Without, Ufford and Wothorpe.

Name	Civil parish	Dedication	Web	Founded	Denomination	Benefice	Notes
All Saints, Wittering	Wittering	All Saints		Medieval	Church of England	Barnack, Bainton, Helpston, Wittering	
St John the Baptist, Barnack with Ufford	Barnack	John the Baptist		Medieval	Church of England	Barnack, Bainton, Helpston, Wittering	
Barnack Baptist Church	Barnack				?		May be defunct
St Mary, Bainton	Bainton	Mary		Medieval	Church of England	Barnack, Bainton, Helpston, Wittering	
St Botolph, Helpston	Helpston	Botwulf of Thorney		Medieval	Church of England	Barnack, Bainton, Helpston, Wittering	
St Andrew, Thornhaugh	Thornhaugh	Andrew		Medieval	Church of England	Thornhaugh etc.	Benefice includes 4 churches in Northants
St Mary the Virgin, Wansford	Wansford	Mary		Medieval	Church of England	Thornhaugh etc.	
St Michael & All Angels, Sutton	Sutton	Michael & Angels		Medieval	Church of England	Castor Benefice	Originally a chapel of ease to Castor
St John the Baptist, Upton	Upton	John the Baptist		Medieval	Church of England	Castor Benefice	Originally a chapel of ease to Castor
St Kyneburgha, Castor	Castor	Kyneburgha		Medieval	Church of England	Castor Benefice	Benefice includes 2 churches in Huntingdonshire
Ailsworth Methodist Church	Ailsworth				Methodist	Peterborough Circuit	
St Mary the Virgin, Marholm	Marholm	Mary		Medieval	Church of England	Castor Benefice	
St Peter, Maxey	Maxey	Peter		Medieval	Church of England	Nine Bridges Benefice	
St Stephen, Etton	Etton	Stephen		Medieval	Church of England	Nine Bridges Benefice	
St Andrew, Northborough	Northborough	Andrew		Medieval	Church of England	Nine Bridges Benefice	
St Benedict, Glinton	Glinton	Benedict of Nursia		Medieval	Church of England	Nine Bridges Benefice	
St Pega, Peakirk	Peakirk	Pega		Medieval	Church of England	Nine Bridges Benefice	Unique dedication
St Bartholomew, Newborough	Newborough	Bartholomew		1823-1830	Church of England	Eye, Newborough & Thorney	
St Matthew, Eye	Eye	Matthew		Medieval	Church of England	Eye, Newborough & Thorney	Current building 1846–1847. Chapel of ease until C16th
SS Mary & Botolph, Thorney	Thorney	Mary, Botwulf		Medieval	Church of England	Eye, Newborough & Thorney	Former abbey
St John the Baptist & Emmanuel, Werrington	None (Werrington)	John the Baptist, Jesus		Medieval	Church of England		Chapel of ease until 1877. Emmanuel built 1988
The Way Family Church	None (Werrington)			2006	Assemblies of God		
Christ International Amazing Ministries	None (Werrington)				?		
Sacred Heart & St Oswald, Peterborough	None (Walton)	Sacred Heart & Oswald			Roman Catholic		
Open Door Church, Walton	None (Walton)			1989	Baptist Union		
Christ Embassy Peterborough	None (Walton)				Christ Embassy		
Brookside Methodist Church	None (Gunthorpe)				Methodist	Peterborough Circuit	
All Saints, Paston	None (Paston)	All Saints		Medieval	Church of England		
Peterborough Vineyard Church	None (Paston)				Vineyard		Meets in Honeyhill Community Centre
The Holy Spirit, Bretton	Bretton	Holy Spirit		1977	Church of England		
Bretton Baptist Church	Bretton			1982-1984	Baptist Union		Plant from Open Door, Harris Street. Building 1987
St Botolph, Longthorpe	None (Longthorpe)	Botwulf of Thorney		Medieval	Church of England		
City Church Peterborough	None (Longthorpe)				Elim		
St Jude, Peterborough	None (Netherton)	Jude		1969	Church of England		
St Andrew's United Reformed Church	None (Netherton)	Andrew		1861	URC		Began as Trinity Congregational. Moved to Netherton 1970
Mor Gregorios Jacobite Syrian Orth. Church	None (Netherton)			2006	Syriac Orthodox		Meets in St Andrew's URC. Malankara Jacobite Syrian
St Luke, Peterborough	None (West Town)	Luke		1901	Church of England	St John & St Luke	
Peterborough Quaker Meeting	None (West Town)				Quakers		
Peterborough Lithuanian City Church	None (West Town)				Elim		
St Paul, New England	None (New England)	Paul		1869	Church of England		
Peterborough Salvation Army	None (New England)				Salvation Army		
New Testament Church of God Peterborough	None (New England)				NTCG		
Christ the Carpenter, Peterborough	None (Dogsthorpe)	Jesus		1957	Church of England		
Our Lady of Lourdes, Peterborough	None (Dogsthorpe)	Mary			Roman Catholic	St Peter & Our Lady of Lourdes	
Peterborough Polish Mission	None (Dogsthorpe)				Polish Catholic		Uses Our Lady of Lourdes
Calvary Baptist Church, Peterborough	None (Dogsthorpe)	Calvary			Independent		
Dogsthorpe Methodist Church	None (Dogsthorpe)				Methodist	Peterborough Circuit	
Inclusive Church Peterborough	None (Peterborough)			2017			
KingsGate Community Church Peterborough	None (Parnwell)			1988	Kingsgate		
All Saints, Peterborough	None (Millfield)	All Saints		1886	Church of England		
Orthodox Parish of St Olga, Peterborough	None (Millfield)	Olga of Kiev			Russian Orthodox		Meets in All Saints Church
Open Door Baptist Church, Harris Street	None (Millfield)			c. 1890	Baptist Union		
Peterborough Central Adventist Church	None (Millfield)				7th-Day Adventist		
Peterborough International Christian Centre	None (Millfield)				Assemblies of God		
El Shaddai Pentecostal Church	None (Millfield)				Assemblies of God		Portuguese. Meets in Open Door Baptist Church
Life Church Peterborough	None (Eastfield)				Newfrontiers (2010)		Meets in Thomas Deacon Academy. Prev. Nene Family Church
St Mark, Peterborough	None (Peterborough)	Mark		1856	Church of England		
St Mary, Peterborough	None (Peterborough)	Mary		1859-1860	Church of England		New building 1989-1991
St John the Baptist, Peterborough	None (Peterborough)	John the Baptist		Medieval	Church of England	St John & St Luke	
Cathedral of SS Peter, Paul & Andrew	None (Peterborough)	Peter, Paul, Andrew		Medieval	Church of England		Abbey until made cathedral 1541
St Peter & All Souls, Peterborough	None (Peterborough)	Peter & All Saints		1896	Roman Catholic	St Peter & Our Lady of Lourdes	
Park Road Baptist Church	None (Peterborough)				Baptist Union		
Westgate New Church	None (Peterborough)			c. 1780	Methodist / URC	Peterborough Circuit	Methodist, URC churches merged 1978. New building 2016
Wellspring Community Church	None (Peterborough)				Elim		Meets in The Beeches Primary School
RCCG Dominion Christian Connections	None (Peterborough)				RCCG		
RCCG City of Grace, Peterborough	None (Eastgate)			2007	RCCG		
St Augustine of Canterbury, Woodston	None (Woodston)	Augustine of Canterbury		Medieval	Church of England		Rebuilt 1844
St Olga Ukrainian Catholic Church	None (Woodston)	Olga of Kiev		1964	Ukrainian Catholic		
Oundle Road Baptist Church	None (Woodston)				Baptist Union		
Southside Methodist Church	None (Woodston)				Methodist	Peterborough Circuit	
Peterborough Ortons Salvation Army	None (Woodston)				Salvation Army		
St Margaret of Antioch, Fletton	None (Fletton)	Margaret the Virgin		Medieval	Church of England		
Peterborough Church of Christ	None (Fletton)				Churches of Christ		
St John the Baptist, Stanground	None (Stanground)	John the Baptist		Medieval	Church of England		Benefice includes 1 church in Huntingdonshire
St Michael & All Angels, Stanground	None (Stanground)	Michael & Angels			Church of England		
Stanground Baptist Church	None (Stanground)				Baptist Union		
Cardea Community Church	None (Stanground)				FIEC		
Holy Trinity, Orton Longueville	Orton Longueville	Trinity		Medieval	Church of England		
Christian Presence in Orton Malborne	Orton Longueville	Jesus Christ		1976	Independent & Ecumencial (founded as CoE-Methodist)		Since 2009 has met in Herlington Community Centre
St Luke, Orton Longueville	Orton Longueville	Luke		1970s	Roman Catholic	Orton & Sawtry	Current building 1989-1990
St Mary, Orton Waterville	Orton Waterville	Mary		Medieval	Church of England		
Christ Church in Orton Goldhay	Orton Waterville	Jesus		2000	CoE / Meth / URC		
Orton Waterville Methodist Church	Orton Waterville				Methodist	Peterborough Circuit	
Christ the Servant King, Hampton	Hampton Hargate & Vale			2014?	Church of England		
Hampton Community Church	Hampton Hargate & Vale				?		
RCCG Freedom Connections	Hampton Hargate & Vale				RCCG		
RCCG Restoration Court, Peterborough	Peterborough				RCCG		

== Defunct churches ==
Name	Civil parish	Dedication	Web	Founded	Redundant	Denomination	Notes
St Andrew, Ufford	Ufford	Andrew		Medieval		Church of England	Churches Conservation Trust 2014
All Saints, Botolph Bridge	Orton Longueville	All Saints		Medieval	1695	Church of England	

== Map of medieval parish churches ==
=== Cambridgeshire ===
Medieval parish churches in Cambridgeshire

=== Central Cambridge ===
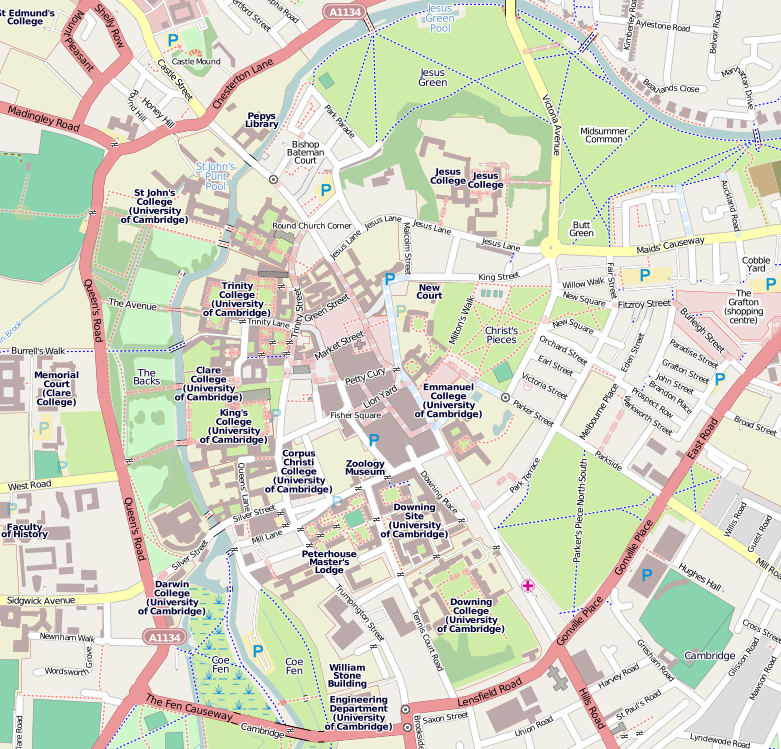
Medieval parish churches in Central Cambridge
