= Eastfield, Peterborough =

Area of Peterborough, England

Coordinates: 52.5800°N 0.2231°W

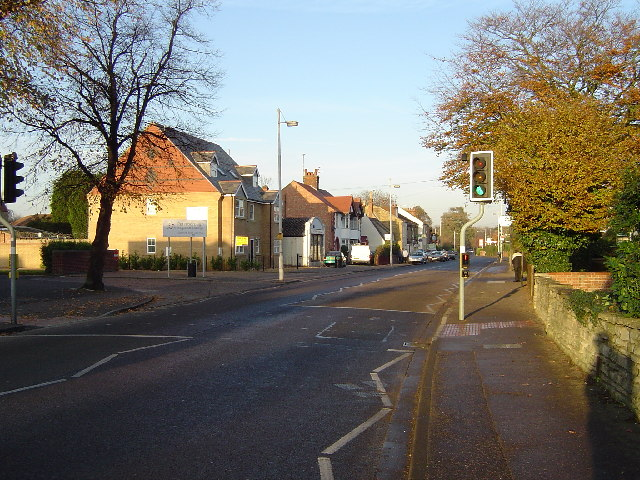
Eastfield Road, Peterborough at entrance to Peterborough Regional College.

Eastfield is a residential area of the city of Peterborough, in the Peterborough district, in the ceremonial county of Cambridgeshire, England. For electoral purposes it comprises part of Peterborough East ward, together with Fengate and Parnwell. In 2001 it had a resident population of 8,424. Of a total 3,824 households, 52.88% are owner occupied, compared to 66.30% in the Peterborough unitary authority area.

== Overview ==
The Church of England parish of Saint Mary the Virgin was created by Order in Council on 1 September 1857. It was the largest parish in the city and comprised Boongate/Eastgate, Eastfield and Newark (then an outlying village) to the east of Peterborough city centre. A church was commissioned as a "poor church" for the parish and its foundation stone was laid on 30 September 1859. It was designed by the Gothic Revival architect Ewan Christian, built of relatively cheap local stone, and consecrated on 7 August 1860. It had a nave, apse and south aisle, and in 1883 a tower with a saddleback roof was added.

In the 20th century the Victorian church was allowed to fall into a state of disrepair and on 22 October 1989 work began on a new building. The new St. Mary's was dedicated by William, Lord Bishop of Peterborough on 16 November 1991.

Newark Hill County Primary School was opened in 1959. The school admits up to 60 children each year and has capacity of 420 pupils. Abbotsmede County Primary also serves the area.

Eastholm School was founded in 1853 but moved to its present site in two stages, Eastholm Secondary Modern School for Girls in 1957 and Eastholm Secondary Modern School for Boys in 1966. The two schools were merged in 1973 and became comprehensive for pupils aged 11–18 when education in the county was reorganised in 1976. The school, which was renamed Hereward Community College in 1997, closed in July 2007 and merged with Deacon's School and John Mansfield School to form the Thomas Deacon Academy which opened in September 2007. City of Peterborough Academy was opened by Greenwood Dale Foundation Trust on the former Eastholm site in 2013; it is co-located with the Academy Special School, which opened in 2012.

St. Thomas Moore Roman Catholic (Voluntary Aided) Primary and St. John Fisher RC Comprehensive schools are also located in the area.

Peterborough Regional College was founded in 1946 as Peterborough Technical College. In 1952 the first instalment of the purpose-built Eastfield site opened on land adjacent to the East of England Showground. Peterborough Agricultural Society moved to a 250-acre (100 ha) site at Alwalton in 1965 and the college was completed in 1969.

Frank Perkins formed and registered the company F. Perkins Limited to develop and manufacture a lightweight high-speed diesel engine in 1932. In 1940 the Eastfield headquarters plant opened and production officially began in 1947 transforming it from a small, family business to a large, modern company which has grown to attain an international market.

Eastfield cemetery opened on the junction of Eastfield Road and Newark Avenue in 1919. Broadway cemetery, which opened in 1858, also backs onto Eastfield Road. Closed to new burials, this has been a designated county wildlife site since 1990. It contains approximately 150 species of flowers and plants, which include meadow saxifrage, ox-eye daisy and common knapweed. The Cross of Sacrifice was erected by the Imperial War Graves Commission in the early 1920s.
