= Road transport in Peterborough =

Road network in Peterborough, East Anglia

The City of Peterborough in East Anglia has an extensive and well integrated road network, owing partly to its status as a new town. Since the 1960s, the city has seen considerable expansion and its various suburbs are linked by a system of parkways.

Peterborough's Parkways

(Note: Key: pink road = Orton Parkway • purple road = Fletton Parkway • brown road = Nene Parkway • blue road = Frank Perkins Parkway • orange road = Paston Parkway • red road = Soke Parkway • green road = Werrington Parkway)

Despite its large-scale growth, Peterborough has the fastest peak and off-peak travel times for a city of its size in the United Kingdom, due to the construction of the parkways. The Local Transport Plan anticipates expenditure totalling around £180 million for the period up to 2010 on major road schemes to accommodate future development.

The A1/A1(M) broadly follows the path of the historic Great North Road from London, through Peterborough (Junction 17), continuing north a further 335 miles (539 km) to central Edinburgh.

== Numbered Junctions ==
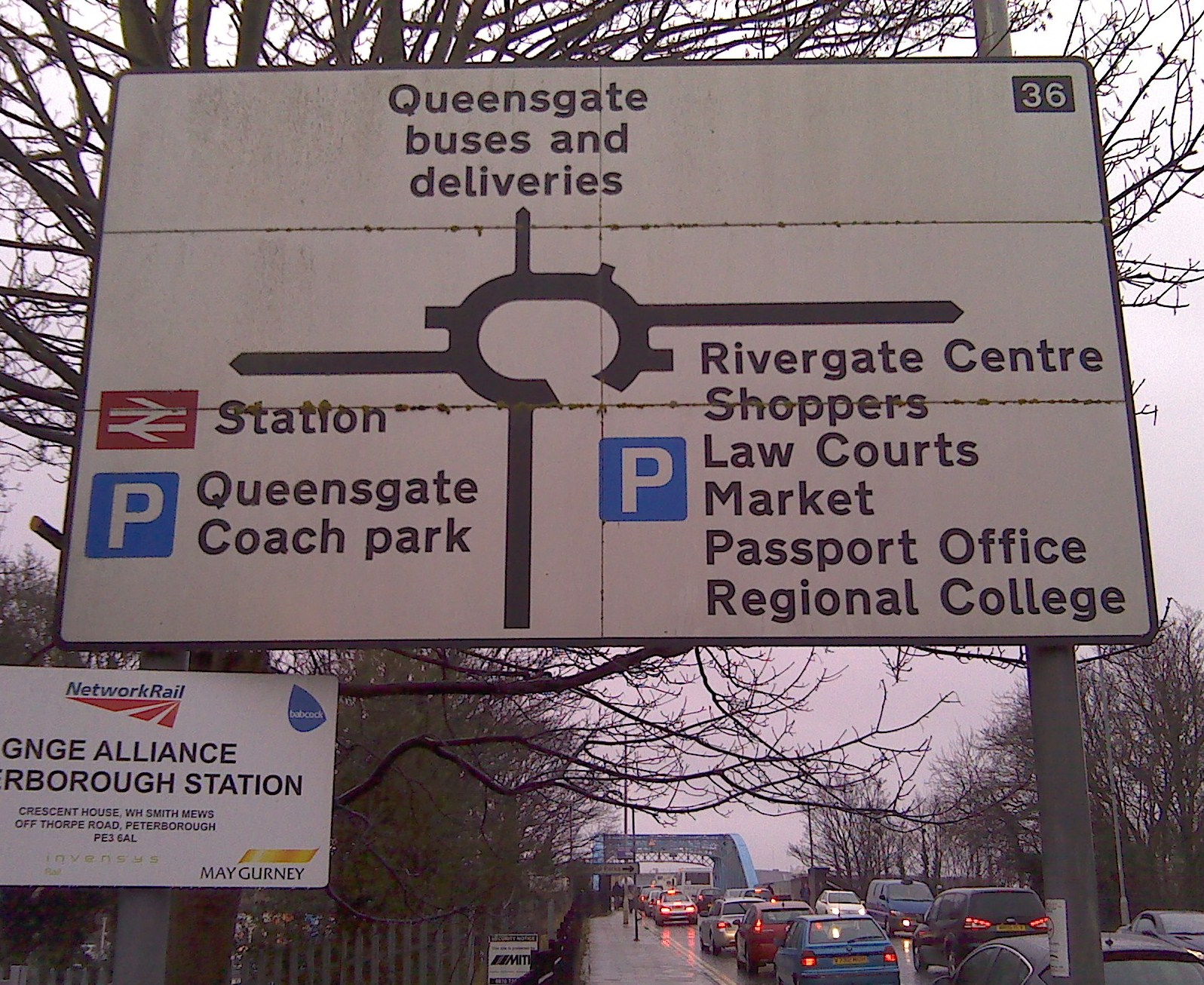
A numbered roundabout sign in Peterborough.

Peterborough has so many roundabouts and grade separated junctions within its roads and parkway system that junctions are numbered using the same system as is used to number British motorway and major A road junctions to guide and help drivers. Peterborough is to date the only city within the United Kingdom to use the system in this way and has been using this system since the 1970s.

== Parkways and major roads ==
The parkways were constructed under guidelines from the Peterborough Development Corporation as a system of high speed roads to connect the new townships which housed London's post-war overspill population and were mostly built from the early 1970s to the late 1980s

The majority of Peterborough's parkways are dual carriageways, to accommodate the large quantity of local traffic within the city, and national and regional traffic bypassing it. However, due to their age, many of the parkways do not have hard-shoulders. Most of the parkways that bypass the city have graded roundabout junctions.

=== A1 road ===
==== Wittering to Norman Cross ====
The A1 is located just to the west of Peterborough. The road does not play a major part in Peterborough's road network itself although it is a major route. The road goes past RAF Wittering before meeting the A47 at Wansford on a grade separated junction. The A1 then moves south passing very close to the Nene Valley Railway line before reaching the city section of the A605 at another grade separated junction before reaching the A1139/A605 Oundle Section grade separated junction. This is also where the A1(M) starts and as a motorway the road quickly moves southward to reach the A15 at Norman Cross where the motorway moves out of the Peterborough area.

=== A15 road ===

==== Glinton to New England (Werrington Parkway) ====
The Werrington Parkway runs from the south of Glinton, where the A15 forks into the Peterborough east bypass and main road into the city centre. The road is dual carriageway from Glinton to the centre of Peterborough. There are no grade separated junctions along its route but does contain a number of smaller roundabouts which give direct and easy access to Werrington and its industrial estates. The Parkway then becomes less and standard dual-carriageway to which speed limits are in place to pass through New England and its retail park along with a major supermarket just prior to reaching the junction with the A47 at a major junction. Because of the speed restrictions along the majority of its route traffic coming into Peterborough are now encouraged to use the Paston Parkway instead to access the city centre and in the past few years signposts have been changed to reflect this.

==== Glinton to Eye (Paston Parkway/A15 Spur Road) ====
The Paston Parkway bypasses the eastern edge of Peterborough, terminating at a roundabout with the A1139, where the city bypass becomes the Frank Perkins Parkway. The road starts at the southernmost roundabout of the Glinton and heads eastward as a single carriageway before coming to a roundabout for local traffic. The road then becomes a major dual carriageway, although it has only one grade separated junction (with the A47), with the other junctions being roundabouts. In 2008, Peterborough City Council funded the dualling of the northernmost stretch of the Paston Parkway between two roundabouts east of Gunthorpe. This has significantly reduced congestion, as the route is used as a commuter run between the city's Eastern Industry development in Fengate and settlements north of the city.

==== City Centre ====
The A15 moves southward as a minor dual carriageway from its junction with the A47 with several more roundabouts lining its route. The road goes past some rail sidings that are rarely used and also goes past a retail shopping area on the site of the city's former Parcel Force depot. After passing the city's Toys R Us store the A15 reaches Queensgate Shopping Centre. The road passes the shopping centre between two of the centre's major Car Parks with a 1980s style footbridge crossing over the top. Two roundabouts are located at either end of the complex. The southern roundabout is a junction with the A1179 and gives access to the city's Bus Station (part of the shopping centre). The A15 then passes through the Westgate shopping area and the city's courts before reaching a roundabout where the dual carriageway part of the road ends.

==== City Centre to Norman Cross ====
The A15 moves out of Peterborough heading southwards as a single carriageway road going past Peterborough United Football Ground. After some traffic light junctions the A15 goes under the A1139 before coming to a roundabout for a business estate. Then the A15 quickly comes to a second roundabout with the A1260 near to Serpentine Green. Then the A15 moves into open countryside before touching the outermost part of Yaxley where it meets the B1091. The A15 again moves into countryside before reaching the A1(M) at a major junction at Norman Cross.

=== A1139 road ===

==== Eye ====
The A1139 starts as a single carriageway road at a minor roundabout with the A47 at Eye. After a second small roundabout the road passes through some housing before meeting the A15 on a major roundabout near Paston.

A1139 – Eye
Westbound Exits		Eastbound Exits
Leicester, A47	Start	Wisbech, King's Lynn A47
		Eye, Peterborough Road

==== Frank Perkins Parkway ====
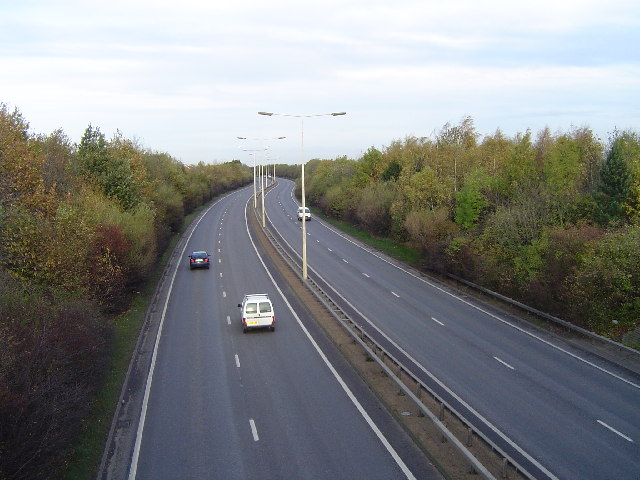
The Frank Perkins Parkway heading towards Newark

The Frank Perkins Parkway is named after Frank Perkins, local founder of Perkins Engines and is the main Eastern Bypass for Peterborough. The parkway has access to the Perkins Engines site. The Parkway heads south as a major dual carriageway from a major roundabout with the A15 near Eye and quickly passes its first junction, which is restricted to southbound traffic and the Perkins Factory before reaching to junction 5 which is a major inlet for city bound traffic. The road then passes over the River Nene and quickly reaches junction 4 where it meets the A605, which runs parallel to junction 3a and the new Stanground bypass out of Peterborough and the old A605, now the B1092. The Frank Perkins Parkway also becomes the Fletton Parkway here.

The first section started construction in January 1983, which opened in December 1984, costing £9 million, being 1.8 miles (2.9 km). The northern extension, costing £1.9 million, started construction in 1986 by Clugston, from Oxney Road to Eye Road, being 1.25 miles (2.01 km). Another section of the northern extension was built by Norwest Holst, being 1-mile (1.6 km), to open in May 1987, but there was cold weather that year, so the section would open in mid-June 1987. There was more bad weather in April, May and June 1987, and the £4.2 million road would not open until late September 1987. It was opened on 16 October 1987 by Conservative MP Marion Roe.

A1139 – Frank Perkins Parkway
Westbound Exits	Junction	Eastbound Exits
Sleaford, A15	J8	Parnwell, Parnwell Way
Newark, Oxney Road	J7	
	J6	Perkins Engines Access
City Centre, Boongate	J5	Newark, Boongate
City Centre, A605	J4	Stanground, A605

==== Fletton Parkway ====
Fletton Parkway comprises the entire southern bypass of Peterborough and terminates westbound at the A1. The Fletton Parkway officially starts at junction 4 as a dual carriageway before which it is named the Frank Perkins Parkway due to them being constructed at different times. The later construction of junction 3A, an access road for the Kingston Park distribution centres large IKEA depot and the new A605 Stanground Bypass, meant a major re-design of junction 4 and a new single carriageway road running parallel with the Fletton Parkway from junctions 3A to 4 providing the only link from junction 4 to the Fletton Parkway. This follows the closure to traffic of the original junction 4 on slip road and removal of the off slip road on safety grounds. At the same time the original on slip road to the Frank Perkins Parkway which actually joined the Fletton Parkway was closed and a new direct on slip road constructed to the north of junction 4. The dual carriageway quickly passes over the A15 before reaching the grade separated junction (3) with the A1260 which links up with the A15 and the A47. The on slip road then forms a third lane and it moves very quickly to junction two, which is a local access road to the Orton and Hampton townships, before reaching its final junction (1) with the Orton Parkway where it reverts to two lanes before the on slip road again forms a third lane. . The Fletton Parkway then meets the A1, the A1(M) and the A605 at Junction 17.

The first stage opened on 19 July 1976, six months early, built by Mears Construction. The second stage, costing £5 million, opened on 20 April 1983.

When first opened in 1976 the Fletton Parkway went from the A1 at Haddon to junction 3 where it joined Peterborough's western and northern bypass roads, the Nene Parkway, Soke Parkway and Paston Parkway. A single carriageway road, Phorpres Way, running parallel to the future course of the Fletton Parkway providing a link to the A15. Around 1979 when the eastern bypass, the Frank Perkins Parkway, was completed the Fletton Parkway was extended to junction 4 to join it and complete the ring road

A1139 – Fletton Parkway
Northbound Exits	Junction	Southbound Exits
Ikea Distribution Centre, Junction 4 access	J3A	Whittlesey, A605, Kingston Park Distribution Centre,
City Centre, Bretton, A1260 Nene Parkway	J3	Hampton, Yaxley, A1260 The Serpentine
Orton Malborne, Malborne Way; Orton Goldhay, Goldway Way	J2	Hampton, Natures Way
Orton Centre, A1139 Orton Parkway	J1	Great Haddon, Roxhill Distribution Centre
Northampton, A605; Stamford, A1	Terminus	Huntingdon, London, A1(M)

==== Orton Parkway ====
The Orton Parkway is a short minor dual carriageway, that is officially classed as the A1139, although it is not part of the main road itself. There is one small roundabout which provides local access to Orton Goldhay, Orton Southgate and Orton Brimbles. The road also helps to carry traffic to events at the nearby East of England Showground.

=== A1179 road ===

==== Longthorpe Parkway and Thorpe Road ====
The A1179 is a short major road that is half dual carriageway and half single carriageway. It runs from the A1260 to the A15 near Queensgate shopping centre, passing over a metal arch bridge over the East Coast Main Line just before its eastern end.

=== A1260 road ===

==== Nene Parkway ====
The A1260 is a major road that serves the western side of Peterborough. The road is dual-carriageway from its southern terminus with the A15 at Hampton to its northern terminus with the A47 at Longthorpe. The road is also known as the "Nene Parkway" and serves as major route from getting from the southern end of Peterborough to the Northern end without having to travel into the centre of the city via the A15. The road itself starts at Hampton at a small roundabout with the A15 where after it goes past Serpentine Green at another roundabout before it very quickly heads to a major junction where its meets the A1139 (Fletton Parkway). This junction was recently upgraded so that four lanes are entering the roundabout at the northbound and southbound entrances. Traffic lights are also present here and it carries lots of traffic to the Hamptons. After that junction the road takes on the form of a major dual-carriageway with its own grade separated junctions where it meets the A605 on a restricted junction before passing over the River Nene before meeting the A1179 (Longthorpe Parkway) on another junction. After that junction the road quickly heads north before coming to a major junction with the A47 where the road ends on a large roundabout with the A47 passing over on top. In 2008, the city council undertook improvements to the roundabout at the southern terminus of the parkway, increasing the southbound and eastbound approaches to three approach lanes and adding a third lane northbound on the roundabout for traffic using a newly constructed running-lane between junctions 1 and 2, where there are now three lanes northbound. Traffic lights have also been installed. In 2024, the southern terminus approach road going southbound was upgraded to four lanes. Traffic signals are also planned on the roundabout at the northern terminus of the parkway with the A47 Soke Parkway.

=== A47 road ===

==== Thorney to Eye ====
The A47 heads west to Peterborough from Wisbech. It bypasses Thorney along a minor dual carriageway. Eye is bypassed by a single carriageway where the A47 meets the A16 and then the A1139 at separate roundabouts. The A47 then becomes dual carriageway, passing a large rubbish tip to reach a major junction with the A15 at Paston.

==== Soke Parkway (Paston to Longthorpe) ====
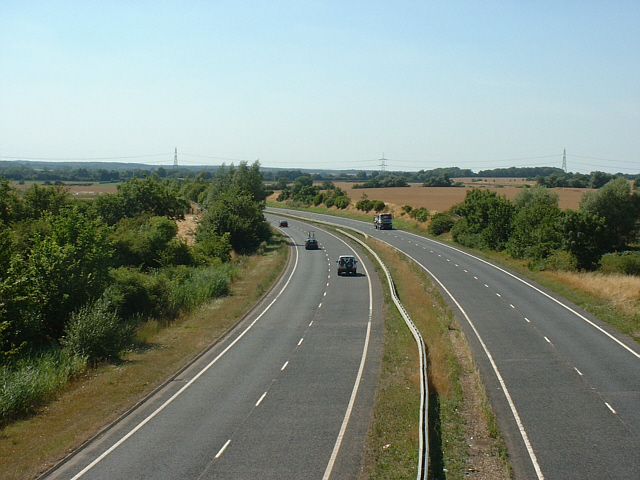
The A47 Soke Parkway heading towards Wansford

The Soke Parkway consists of the entire section of the A47 that runs through Peterborough. As a trunk route, the stretch of road is maintained by the Highways Agency, who have recently undertaken an update of road lighting on the route. This section of road is called the Soke Parkway (named after the Soke of Peterborough). When this was first built, in the mid-1970s, the A47 followed what is now the A1139 Paston Parkway. Apart from a roundabout on the eastern edge of the city, the parkway is an unbroken major dual carriageway. The road passes over the A15 (Paston Parkway) as a roundabout and then heads westwards passing one grade separated junction with a local road. The road then meets the city section of the A15 on an unusual junction. It crosses the East Coast Main Line near to a Morrisons (former Safeway), and Boulevard and Brotherhood retail parks in New England. After passing the A15 the A47 quickly heads south-westwards, where after passing another grade separated junction for local traffic the road meets the A1260 at Longthorpe. The Nene Parkway terminates in the Peterborough Longthorpe Grade separated junction (GSJ) (which opened in December 1987) where it meets the A1260 Nene Parkway. There is a GSJ for Bretton and a Sainsbury's, and it passes the Bretton Woods Community School. The £1.2m Peterborough Westwood GSJ opened in January 1987. After passing this junction the A47 heads westward into open countryside where it bypasses Castor and Ailsworth before the road becomes a single carriageway before reaching the A1 at Wansford.

=== A605 road ===

==== Stanground/Kingston Park ====
The A605 comes into Peterborough from Whittlesey and comes into the city via the Stanground bypass. Once on the bypass the road heads towards the Kingston Park distribution center and then turns right at the roundabout and continues under the A1139 Fletton Parkway. From there it follows a short piece of single carriageway until it meets up with the Stanground roundabout junction with the A1139 and B1091. From there it continues towards the city and once again under the A1139 and finally meets with the A15 at the Peacock junction just short of the Peterborough United football ground.

==== City Section ====
This section of the A605 is now completely isolated from the rest of the other sections of this road. The city section starts at the Town Bridge junction with the A15 near Peterborough United football ground. The road heads in a westward direction towards the A1 as single carriageway. The road meets the A1260 at a restricted junction near The Ortons with the road passing underneath. The road than passes into The Ortons, where it provides a lot of local traffic to those who live in those areas. The road passes a couple of roundabouts which allow for local access, and also Ferry Meadows before reaching an industrial estate and Business park, where it meets a spur of the A1139. The road than passes another small roundabout before reaching the A1. To reach the Peterborough to Elton section of this road you must follow the A1139 spur until the junction with the main A1139 then take a right at the roundabout and follow the signs for the A1/A1(M)/A605 Northampton/Oundle

==== Peterborough to Elton ====
The A605 leaves its junction with the A1(M)/A1/A1139 as a major single carriageway by widening to three lanes, before climbing up a hill close to the Peterborough (Morborne) FM & DAB radio transmitter is located. It then moves back to two lanes before moving on to Elton and out of Peterborough.
