= Richard Littlejohn =

British journalist and writer

- Born: 18 January 1954 (age 72); Ilford, Essex, England
- Occupation: Journalist
- Employer: DMG Media
- Spouse: Wendy A. Bosworth (m. 1974)

Richard Littlejohn (born 18 January 1954) is an English author, broadcaster and opinion column writer, having started his career as a journalist. As of May 2023, he writes a twice-weekly column for the Daily Mail about British affairs.

Littlejohn has been a columnist for The Sun, but had written for The Spectator and the London Evening Standard. Littlejohn earned a place in the inaugural Press Gazette Newspaper Hall of Fame as one of the most influential journalists of the past 40 years. He was awarded the title of "Columnist of the Year" at the 1997 British Press Awards.

Littlejohn has been criticised for insufficient fact-checking and for alleged anti-gay bigotry. Primarily a newspaper journalist, he has also presented numerous radio and television shows and has authored or co-authored several books.

== Early life ==
Littlejohn was born in Ilford, Essex in 1954. His family moved to Peterborough when he was five. His father worked as a policeman and later as a manager for British Rail. Littlejohn attended West Town Primary School where he passed the eleven-plus, obtaining the highest marks in his year. He was offered a public school scholarship which he turned down because the school did not play football, and subsequently attended Deacon's School in Dogsthorpe, Peterborough.

At Deacon's School he appeared, when 13, as part of a team of four boys in Top of the Form against Kings Norton Grammar School for Girls, broadcast on Sunday 22 October 1967 on the new BBC Radio 2, which was recorded on Tuesday 19 September 1967. In his team were Michael Conning, Martin Bradshaw of Walton, and the captain Martin Chambers. It was recorded in the school hall with John Ellison; and Tim Gudgin from Kings Norton.

== Journalism ==
At 16, Littlejohn found employment as a trainee journalist in Peterborough. He worked for local newspapers during the early 1970s. In the mid-1970s, he joined the Birmingham Evening Mail as an industrial correspondent.

He worked at the London newspaper the Evening Standard from 1979 to 1989, initially as industrial editor, later a feature writer, then in 1988 as a columnist. While industrial editor in the early 1980s he was asked to stand as a Labour Party candidate, which he declined. In 1989, he joined The Sun as a columnist, which attracted controversy, and he was voted "Irritant of the Year" at the 1992 What The Papers Say Awards.

In March 1993 he gave his support to the "Save the New Statesman fund" to raise cash to contest libel suits served on the magazine by the then Prime Minister John Major and caterer Claire Latimer.

In 1994, he left The Sun to write for the Daily Mail, contributing columns on news and current affairs (in a similar format to his Sun column), and one on sport. His Mail columns earned him the title "Columnist of the Year" at the 1997 British Press Awards.

In February 1998, Littlejohn became the UK's best-paid columnist when he returned to The Sun to write a twice-weekly column as part of a £1million deal, which also included presenting for BSkyB.

In addition to regular columns, Littlejohn has contributed articles to The Spectator and Punch.

One of Littlejohn's Sun columns – a 2004 skit, entitled "Rum, Sodomy and the Lifejacket", in which Lord Nelson is confronted with political correctness, compensation culture and the nanny state – had been published in newspapers, magazines, and websites with Littlejohn's writing credit removed.

In 2004, the Diary column of The Guardian newspaper documented the results of a "Littlejohn audit"—a count of the number of references Littlejohn makes to homosexuality in his columns. Marina Hyde of The Guardian wrote in 2004:

In the past year's Sun columns, Richard has referred 42 times to gays, 16 times to lesbians, 15 to homosexuals, eight to bisexuals, twice to 'homophobia' and six to being "homophobic" (note his inverted commas), five times to cottaging, four to "gay sex in public toilets", three to poofs, twice to lesbianism, and once each to buggery, dykery, and poovery. This amounts to 104 references in 90-odd columns – an impressive increase on his 2003 total of 82 mentions.

In May 2005, the Mail announced that he was rejoining the paper in a move that Mail editor Paul Dacre described as "returning to his spiritual home". The Sun sought an injunction to prevent Littlejohn writing for the Mail before his existing contract with them ended in February 2006, but the matter was later settled out of court and Littlejohn began writing for the Mail in December 2005.

In December 2010, Littlejohn satirised an incident in which a 20-year-old man with cerebral palsy, Jody McIntyre, complained of mistreatment by police at a protest. Littlejohn argued that the young man involved should not have attended the protest, and compared him to Andy Pipkin from Little Britain. This prompted 500 complaints to the Press Complaints Commission.

In December 2012, the Daily Mail published an apology following a piece written by Littlejohn which suggested that ethnic minority staff had got their jobs through discrimination and had threatened to sue the Equality and Human Rights Commissions. The Daily Mail agreed with the Press Complaints Council to publish an apology and clarification.

=== Asian hopscotch lessons ===
In February 2011, Littlejohn wrote in his Daily Mail column that Haringey Council was using tax-payer funds for hopscotch lessons for Asian women. This was an urban myth first propagated in 1995 by the former Conservative Party chairman Brian Mawhinney, who took the name of the Hopscotch Asian Women's Centre literally. The centre offers "support services for Asian women and their families on a wide range of issues including domestic violence, benefits, housing, education, immigration and health matters [and provided] advocacy and support to people with learning disabilities".

=== Lucy Meadows ===
In December 2012, Littlejohn wrote an article criticising the decision of Accrington teacher Lucy Meadows to return to the same school after undergoing gender reassignment surgery. Littlejohn repeatedly misgendered Meadows and stated: "he's [sic] not only trapped in the wrong body, he's [sic] in the wrong job".

In March 2013, Meadows was found dead with police reporting no suspicious circumstance, suggesting suicide. Littlejohn's article was later removed from the Daily Mail's website following Meadows' death. Trans Media Watch, a charity for transgender people, said: "We are deeply saddened that this inquest should ever have been needed." A petition drive was launched demanding Littlejohn be sacked. Two petitions signed by over 240,000 people were handed over to the Daily Mail offices.

At the inquest into her death on 28 May 2013, it was reported Meadows had contacted the Press Complaints Commission (PCC) over press harassment citing Littlejohn. Blackburn and Hyndburn Coroner Michael Singleton stated that press coverage of her gender reassignment was "ill informed bigotry" and that Littlejohn in his article had "carried out what can only be described as a character assassination, having sought to ridicule and humiliate Lucy Meadows and bring into question her right to pursue her career as a teacher".

=== Jack Monroe ===
In 2013, Littlejohn was accused of taking insufficient care to check the facts before publishing an article critical of cookery writer and poverty campaigner Jack Monroe. Littlejohn suggested that Monroe chose to give up her job. Monroe's young son was unsettled with a range of different carers. As Monroe had grown up in a home with foster children, she is aware of the potential for harming him. Monroe tried unsuccessfully to negotiate flexible hours so she could work and look after her baby, but gave up her job so she could look after the child better. Littlejohn incorrectly suggested that Monroe was an unemployed welfare claimant.

=== Tom Daley ===
On 15 February 2018, Littlejohn, writing for his Daily Mail column, focused on the news that Tom Daley and his husband Dustin Lance Black were expecting their first child. Littlejohn stated that while he supported fostered children being brought up by loving, gay partners, as opposed to living in state institutions, he nonetheless adhered to his belief that children "benefit most from being raised by a man and a woman". He also criticised that in many cases of male gay relationships, Daley and Black included, women were being seen as "mere breeding machines" (their baby's surrogate mother not having been identified) and that offspring were shown off like "commodities".

Littlejohn was accused by PinkNews of anti-gay bigotry. As a result, Center Parcs announced its decision to cease publication of its advertisements in the Daily Mail, with a number of other businesses also reviewing their decision to advertise in the newspaper.

=== Radio ===
By the end of the 1980s, Littlejohn was known in London for his Evening Standard columns, and was invited on to radio programmes as a pundit. From 1991, he worked for the London radio station LBC, beginning with a regular opinion spot. LBC later gave Littlejohn an early afternoon show, Littlejohn's Long Lunch; the programme was a talk show featuring topical discussion, phone-ins, and guests. He later became permanent presenter of the morning show, replacing Michael Parkinson.

During his time at LBC, Littlejohn was censured by the Radio Authority for breaching broadcasting rules. This culminated in the Radio Authority stating that he "had broken half-a-dozen rules and had incited violence" due to an edition of his phone-in show in which he suggested the police should have used flamethrowers against a group of "militant homosexuals" protesting outside the House of Commons.

On another LBC phone-in he was censured by the Radio Authority for describing the Royal Family as a "bunch of tax-evading adulterers".

He also deputised for Jimmy Young on BBC Radio 2 and hosted football phone-ins on BBC Radio 5 Live.

=== Television ===
After leaving LBC in 1994, Littlejohn was approached by BSkyB managing director (and former Sun editor) Kelvin MacKenzie, and was offered the chance to present a nightly current affairs show on the TV channel Sky News. Called Richard Littlejohn, the show ran for one year, but was not a success. Littlejohn expressed his disappointment, stating that broadcasting regulations would not permit him to present the show in the style of Rush Limbaugh's programmes: "If Sky News could emulate its US sister Fox News... ratings would soon shoot past the Astra satellite. But the regulators won't allow it."

Later in 1994, Trevor Phillips of London Weekend Television hired Littlejohn to host a studio-based talk show entitled Richard Littlejohn Live And Uncut. Phillips produced three series of the programme, which was transmitted only in the London area.

On Littlejohn's show of 8 July 1994, he was critical of two lesbians, one of whom was Linda Bellos. The film director Michael Winner, a guest on the show, criticised Littlejohn for his views.

Littlejohn hosted the first series of Channel 4's game show Wanted, as a stand-in for Bob Mills. Wanted aired in October 1996 and won a Silver Rose at the Festival Rose d'Or. As part of a 1997 deal, which saw him return to The Sun, Littlejohn hosted a nightly talk show on Sky One called Littlejohn: Live And Unleashed.

In early 2003, he returned to Sky News to present Littlejohn, a live talk show initially broadcast twice weekly but later extended to four nights per week. The programme was dropped on 8 July 2004 when Sky News changed format and replaced it with regular rolling news.

On 9 July 2007, Channel 4 showed a documentary entitled The War on Britain's Jews?, written and narrated by Littlejohn. Littlejohn has also appeared on BBC One's Question Time and Have I Got News for You.

=== Books ===
Littlejohn has authored or co-authored:

- The Essex Girl Joke Book (1991, Corgi Publishing) – a collection of Essex girl jokes, co-written (with "Brent Wood" {Mitchell Symons}) under the pseudonym "Ray Leigh".
- You Couldn't Make It Up (1995, Heinemann, ISBN 0-434-00238-0) – named after one of Littlejohn's catchphrases, and described on the jacket as "a brilliant collection of liberal-skewering wit and wisdom", this is a book of recollections and opinion pieces on subjects such as political correctness, politicians, corporate "fat cats", the European Union, and the British Royal Family. Anthony Daniels, writing in The Daily Telegraph, said: "...not only does he never mention foreigners in any but a derogatory way – when he is far too intelligent a man really to believe that we have nothing to learn from any of them – but when he writes of the Germans and the Japanese as having taken our cars and electronics industries he is pandering to the kind of stupid, ignorant, sentimental, self-pitying xenophobia which is the root of all fascism, and which is an obstacle to genuine self improvement." The New Statesman wrote: "Not exactly New Statesman territory, but the pick of the best tabloid columnist in Britain is a joy from beginning to end. Hysterically funny, wonderfully politically incorrect, [...] the only writer in Britain to rival the best of the Americans."
- To Hell in a Handcart (2001, HarperCollins, ISBN 0-00-710613-0) – named after another of his catchphrases, this is Littlejohn's only novel, based loosely on the Tony Martin case. The book was lambasted by critics for its portrayal of asylum seekers and the stereotypical individuals in the book, notably by The Independent's David Aaronovitch who described it as "a 400-page recruiting pamphlet for the British National Party". However, it received positive reviews from some conservative writers such as Frederick Forsyth and Andrew Roberts. This was later the subject of a BBC Radio 5 Live discussion with Will Self.
- The Book of Useless Information (with Keith Waterhouse, 2002, John Blake Publishing, ISBN 1-903402-79-4) – co-written with Keith Waterhouse, this "stocking filler" book is a collection of "useless" facts, described on the cover as "all you never needed to know and didn't need to ask".
- The Ultimate Book of Useless Information (with Keith Waterhouse, 2004, John Blake Publishing, ISBN 1-84454-060-X) – another volume of "useless" facts.
- Littlejohn's Britain – Publisher: Hutchinson (3 May 2007) ISBN 0-09-179568-0 – described by The Observer as "lampooning New Labour with polemic, pastiche, parody, satire and savage social commentary". The New Statesman said of it: "Littlejohn's Britain doesn't exist. Literally. He spends much of the year writing from a gated mansion in Florida, and admitted in a recent column that, when he is in Britain, he rarely leaves the house. He is describing a country he sees only through the pages of the right-wing press and his self-reinforcing mailbag."
- Littlejohn's House of Fun: Thirteen Years of (Labour) Madness – Publisher: Hutchinson (1 April 2010) ISBN 978-0-09-193168-1 – Reviewing for The Daily Telegraph Roger Lewis said: "If you prize free expression, this book is essential reading. I was unable to find fault with a single sentiment."
- Littlejohn's Lost World – Publisher:Arrow Books (2014) ISBN 978-0-099-56928-2 – a volume of autobiography covering the author's first sixteen years.

== Personal life ==
Littlejohn is a keen football fan and since the late 1960s has been a supporter of Tottenham Hotspur. He has starred in his own football video, We Woz Robbed.

He married Wendy A. Bosworth in 1974. They have two children.
