= University Centre Peterborough =

UK higher education institution

Coordinates: 52.5861°N 0.2346°W

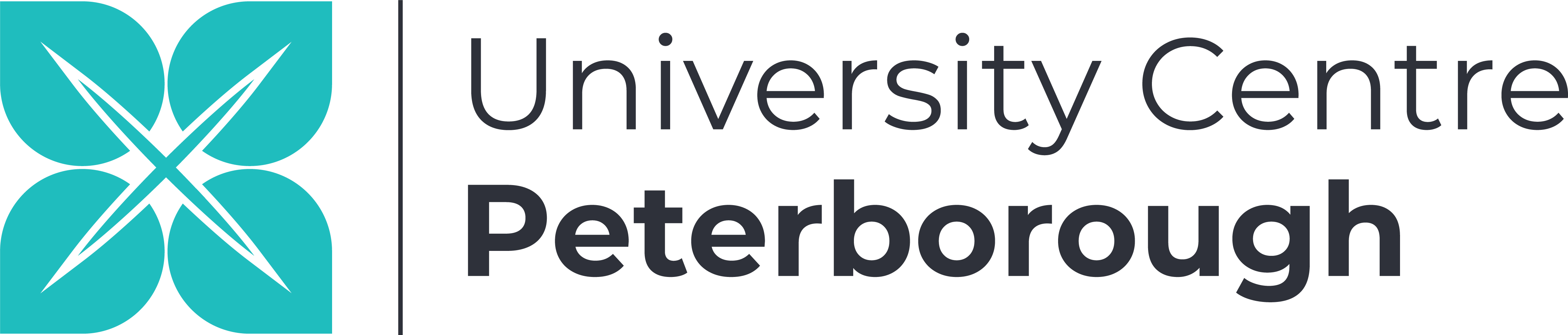
- Established: 2009
- Affiliations: Peterborough College; Stamford College
- Students: 700 in 2020/2021
- Location: Park Crescent, Peterborough, Cambridgeshire PE1 4DZ
- Chair of Council: Les Ebdon CBE DL
- Website: ucp.ac.uk

University Centre Peterborough is a higher education institution with campuses in Peterborough and Stamford, Lincolnshire in England. It is formally part of the Inspire Education Group. Degrees at the Peterborough Campus are accredited by The Open University. The Stamford Campus has a range of courses accredited by Bishop Grosseteste University.

University Centre Peterborough was opened in 2009.

== History ==
Since the 1990s, Loughborough University operated a satellite higher education campus in Peterborough. However, it was closed in 2003, leaving the city as one of the largest urban areas in the country without a dedicated provision of higher education.

At around this time, Peterborough Regional College (a local further education college) was offering a limited range of higher education diplomas and degrees in conjunction with Anglia Ruskin University. In 2006, the two institutions began talks on developing a new university campus for the city and created a new joint venture company in 2007. The joint venture company, limited by guarantee, was managed by an equal number of directors from both partner institutions who were responsible for the academic and operational running of the new centre.

The University Centre Peterborough formally opened in October 2009 with 850 students. However, the joint venture was dissolved in 2020, and University Centre Peterborough became a wholly owned subsidiary of Inspire Education Group. Anglia Ruskin University opened a separate campus in Peterborough.

== Today ==
Facilities at University Centre Peterborough include a lecture theatre, three IT laboratories, open access IT suites and general-purpose teaching accommodation with audio-visual and IT facilities. The centre also has refreshment areas and a student support centre, which includes a Student Union space.

The Peterborough Campus is housed in a dedicated building which is situated opposite the main campus of Peterborough College. Most of the higher education courses previously offered by the college are now located within the University Centre.

Courses offered by the university centre Peterborough campus are validated by The Open University and include HNCs, HNDs and BA honours degrees. The centre also offers a number of post-graduate courses, as well as qualifications from the Chartered Institute of Personnel and Development.

== See also ==
- Peterborough College
- Stamford College, Lincolnshire
- Anglia Ruskin University
- University Centre Hastings
