= Millfield, Peterborough =

Residential area of Peterborough, England

Coordinates: 52°35′14″N 0°14′57″W

Millfield is a residential area of the city of Peterborough, in the ceremonial county of Cambridgeshire, England. For electoral purposes it comprises the main part of Peterborough Central ward. The area falls within the ecclesiastical parish of Saint Mark (Lincoln Road) with Saint Barnabas (Taverners' Road).

A multicultural area, the area has at times seen high racial tensions and disturbances, most notably in September 2001 when teenager Ross Parker was murdered by a gang of men of British Pakistani origin, in an unprovoked and racially motivated attack. The Faidhan-e-Madina Mosque opened in nearby New England in 2003.

Gladstone and The Beeches County Primary and Queen's Drive Infant schools are located in the area. Following the closure of Deacon's School in July 2007, secondary pupils attend the Thomas Deacon Academy which opened in September 2007.

The former Italian Catholic mission church of Saint Joseph (San Giuseppe) was run by the Scalabrini Fathers for many years and the adjacent nursery, which opened in 1977, was originally run by the missionary sisters.
