= PCAE =

PCAE may refer to:

- Perpich Center for Arts Education
- Peterborough College of Adult Education, which became the City College of Peterborough in 2010
