= Peterborough College =

College in Peterborough, England

Coordinates: 52.5868°N 0.2302°W

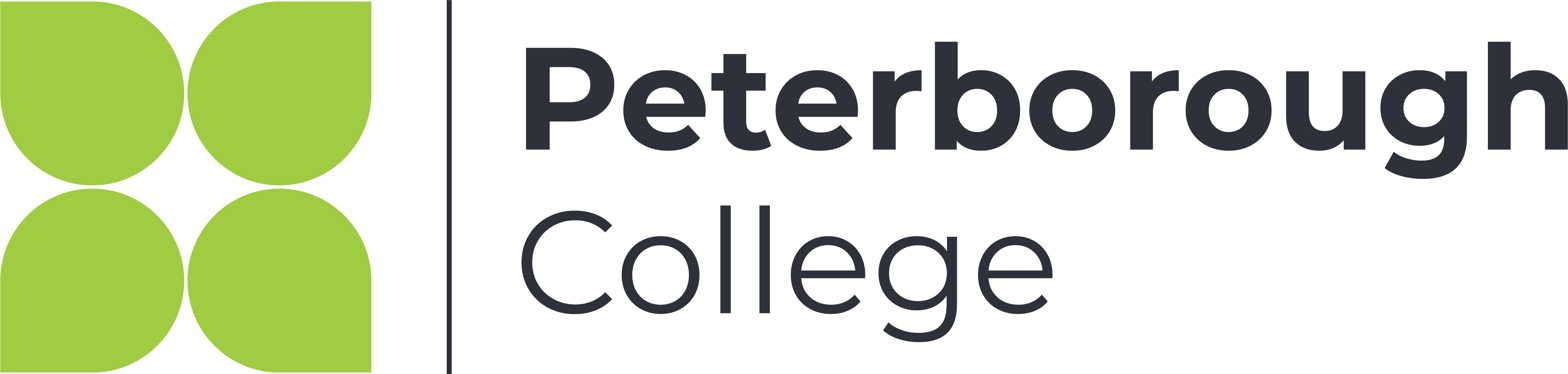
- Established: 1946 (1944 Evening Institutes)
- Principal: Rachel Nicholls
- Location: Park Crescent, Peterborough, Cambridgeshire PE1 4DZ
- Website: peterborough.ac.uk

Peterborough College, established in 1946 as Peterborough Technical College, is a major further education college in Peterborough, Cambridgeshire, England.

== History ==
Engineering firms Peter Brotherhood and Baker Perkins relocated to Peterborough just after 1900 and, by the 1930s, British Thomson-Houston (which became Hotpoint), Newall Engineering and Mitchell Engineering were established. Peterborough was already an important railway centre providing a great deal of work for the populace, but with all this industry there was no local provision for training.

In 1903, the County Technical School was set up in a small building in Broadway in the city centre with boys studying mathematics, science, technical drawing and some technological subjects. Girls studied a programme for employment in commerce. This was closed in 1926 to save money. Some technical classes did continue but were held as evening classes at Deacon's Grammar School, other schools and the Broadway building.

With the onset of war in 1939, the major engineering firms had to expand to produce munitions and other vital military equipment. The demand for skilled men, and also now for women, escalated but there was nothing in the education or training field to cope with this demand. The industrial expansion continued but it wasn't until 1944, that the Soke of Peterborough Education Committee established Advisory Committees for Engineering and Building and reorganised courses into the Senior Evening Institute of Commercial and Technical Students, Junior Evening Institute and Adult Institute. Classes were held all over the city but, in 1946, temporary premises were erected on land in Garton End Road to provide space for engineering subjects. Pressure from local firms with education and training policies resulted in the Education Committee supporting a plan for Peterborough Technical College, initially at the Garton End Road site.

The separate Adult Education Institute became Peterborough College of Adult Education in 1970, when it moved to its own premises on Brook Street. Since 2010, it has been known as City College Peterborough.

In 1952, the first instalment of the new, purpose built Eastfield site opened. In the following years four more building instalments were made and the developments were the result of a collaboration between the firms of the area, the county council and the principal and governors of the college.

In 1987, Peterborough Technical College was renamed Peterborough Regional College and in 1993, it became a Corporation under the Further and Higher Education Act 1992, with new branding and plans to deliver degrees validated by leading universities.

A £120 million development saw the college move into new buildings on the site of its existing campus in 2012.

In 2020, Peterborough Regional College and New College Stamford merged to form the Inspire Education Group. The college was renamed Peterborough College.

== Today ==
Peterborough College currently admits around 3,500 full-time and 12,000 part-time students, encompassing the widest range of courses in the Greater Peterborough area. The first undergraduate programme, offered in conjunction with De Montfort University, was introduced in 1993.

The college offers a range of qualifications including GCSEs, Ordinary and Higher National Diplomas, undergraduate and postgraduate degrees, City & Guilds, NVQs and professional qualifications. The college also offers courses for international students, including IELTS English language proficiency testing.

Computing courses for those trying to get back into employment or wishing to update skills, together with a range of literacy and numeracy classes, were previously run from the Corn Exchange in the city centre. The college now provides similar courses at the City Learning Centre. The Media Centre also moved from Hightrees, adjacent to the main site on Eastfield Road, to purpose-built premises on Broadway with industry standard facilities.

In 2006, Peterborough Regional College began talks with Anglia Ruskin University on developing a new university campus for the city. The college and the university then created a new joint venture company to build a new higher education centre. The joint venture company, limited by guarantee, was managed by an equal number of directors from both partner institutions who were responsible for the academic and operational running of the centre. University Centre Peterborough opened in 2009 and houses most of the higher education provision previously offered by the college.

The joint venture company was dissolved in 2020, and University Centre Peterborough became a wholly owned subsidiary of Inspire Education Group. Anglia Ruskin University continues to accredit undergraduate degree courses at the Peterborough campus.

== See also ==
- University Centre Peterborough
- City College Peterborough
- Stamford College, Lincolnshire
