= Eastgate, Peterborough =

Coordinates: 52°34′34″N 0°13′43″W

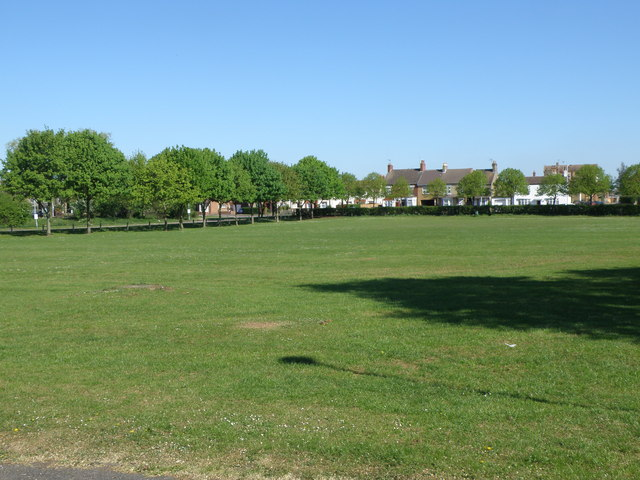
Park area, Eastgate Sandwiched between the Parkway and the swimming pool

Eastgate is a suburb of Peterborough, in the ceremonial county of Cambridgeshire, England. It lies immediately to the east of Peterborough Cathedral and west of Fengate. For electoral purposes it forms part of Peterborough Central ward.

Bishop Creighton County Primary School is located in the area; following the closure of nearby Hereward Community College in July 2007, secondary pupils attend the Thomas Deacon Academy which opened in September 2007.
