= To Hell in a Handcart =

Novel by Richard Littlejohn

- First edition (publ. HarperCollins)
- Author: Richard Littlejohn
- Language: English
- Publisher: HarperCollins
- Publication date: 2001
- ISBN: 0-00-710613-0 (first edition)
- Dewey Decimal: 823.914
- LC Class: PR6112.I88 T6

To Hell in a Handcart (2001) is a controversial dystopian novel by English journalist Richard Littlejohn.

== Plot ==
Mickey French is an ex-cop and firearms expert who was invalided out after many years in the profession. He and his family have a bad day out at a theme park and a social worker threatens his son with jail, helped by a bent lawyer. But Mickey has a get out of jail free card in the form of evidence that a top lawyer and a top cop broke the law in their early days. He uses it to get his son off.

The pair want the evidence back as it could ruin their careers so they employ a Romanian criminal who is in trouble with the police (and the Russian mafia) for a petty crime, to burn down Mickey's house, and the evidence. Mickey meanwhile has packed his family off to Florida (after local gypsies broke into his house, wrecked it and killed his cat as a warning to him) and not feeling like bed, nods off in a chair only to be woken up by the criminal entering his house.

Mickey hears the criminal enter and thinking the gypsies are back again wanting to hurt him or worse, he shoots and kills the criminal, then calls the police. After using self-defence against a man who had broken into his home, Mickey French finds himself arrested and faced with national notoriety, as Roberta Peel (the cop) and her lawyer friend seek to fit him up for murder. Unknown to Mickey, Peel has been in his house and took his evidence against her.

== Reception ==
Reviewing the novel for The Guardian, Andrew Anthony noted that the storyline bore striking similarities to The Face by Gary Bushell which was released the same year:

"Both are set in contemporary London; both outline the moral collapse of the country; both take a lively interest in traffic jams, KY Jelly and police truncheons; neither is keen on asylum-seekers or the Guardian, and both feature a character called Michael French."

Similarities between the two texts were also noted in The Independent, where reviewer David Aaronovitch remarked" Littlejohn may not be racist, but his book is."

Writing in The Sun, Frederick Forsyth said "at one level To Hell In A Handcart is funny, just a good story...but at a deeper level it hints at a coming nightmare... something happening in and to our beloved country that worries the hell out of me".
