= Warmington, Northamptonshire =

Village in Northamptonshire, England

Coordinates: 52.510°N 0.417°W

Warmington
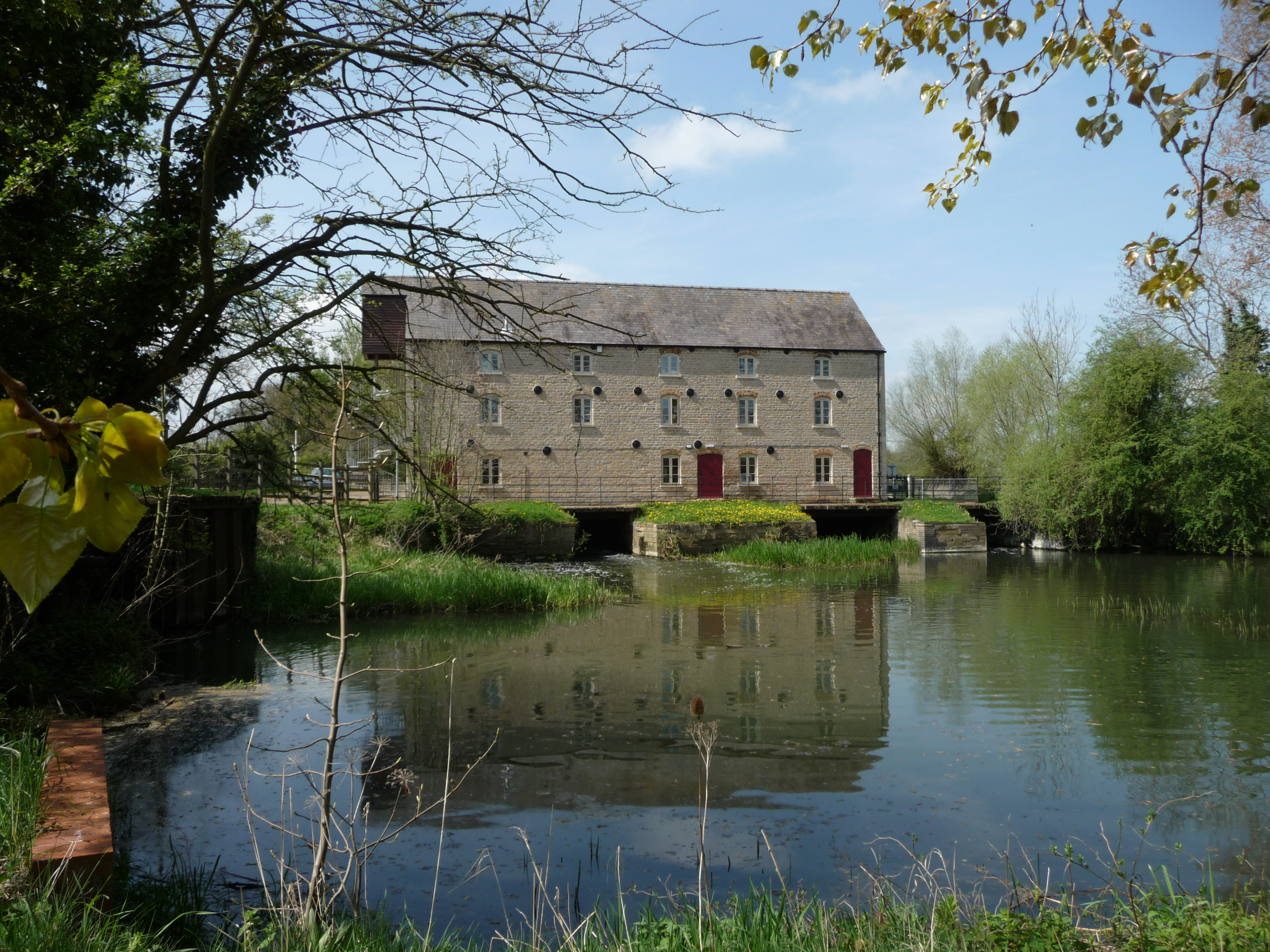
- Warmington Mill

- Location within Northamptonshire
- Population: 939 (2011)
- OS grid reference: TL075915
- Civil parish: Warmington
- Unitary authority: North Northamptonshire
- Ceremonial county: Northamptonshire
- Region: East Midlands
- Country: England
- Sovereign state: United Kingdom
- Post town: PETERBOROUGH
- Postcode district: PE8
- Dialling code: 01832
- Police: Northamptonshire
- Fire: Northamptonshire
- Ambulance: East Midlands
- UK Parliament: Corby and East Northamptonshire

Warmington is a village and civil parish in North Northamptonshire, England with a population of 874 (as of the 2001 census), increasing to 939 at the 2011 Census.

The village's name means 'Farm/settlement which is connected with Wyrma'.

It is 2 1/2 miles east of the town of Oundle near the Cambridgeshire border and is 10 miles south west of the city of Peterborough. It has a large 13th-century church, and fine watermill, manor house and dovecote. Most of the houses, however, were built in the 1960s and 1970s. A large estate of private homes has been added since the turn of the millennium increasing the size of the village by around 30%. Warmington is a working, functional village with some impressive old stone buildings which are considered very attractive. The Nene Way footpath runs through the village and is well signposted.

== History ==
Warmington appears in an Anglo-Saxon text datable 983 x 985 (Sawyer no. 1448a), listing the names of sureities of the estate.

== Amenities ==
Warmington has a small primary school that in 1980 had around 25 pupils in total but has since grown considerably over the years. There is a village shop and post office, a garage and a pub, The Red Lion which is the site of the annual fireworks party for villagers and visitors and a village hall which hosts social events, groups and clubs for all ages. The nearest junior and secondary schools are in Oundle.

There was a village police constable in a designated police house up until the late 1980s. Patrols are now made intermittently via Oundle constabulary who provide a PCSO (Police Community Support Officer) and local residents are advised by their local Neighbourhood Watch members.

Warmington has an old water mill which functioned until the mid twentieth century, which was previously restored and used as a retail outlet for the ceramic tile company, Fired Earth. In the late 1990s a fire destroyed the roof and much of the timber work in the building. Since being refurbished the mill now home to RxSport and Tortoise + Black

Residents and visitors may walk from Warmington across the flood plains to Fotheringhay, a historic medieval village, and to the Fotheringhay castle site where Mary, Queen of Scots, was executed in 1587 and Richard III was born in 1452. There is currently an application to extract gravel from these historic flood plains and, whilst it is claimed that the footpath will remain in some form during the work with the plains restored following the work (10+years), the view will undoubtedly be altered forever.

In the village there are 28 listed buildings, including the Mill and the Dovecote.

The farmers fields that encircle the village and give its rural feel, are now mostly owned by the Proby family in nearby Elton village - who are based at Elton Hall. As little ago as the 1960s there were as many as six local farmers resident in the village.

== Transport ==
The village can be accessed by a single carriageway main road, the A605, or winding country lanes leading from villages such as Morborne and Ashton via the steep 'Cooke's Hill named after the farmers there in the 1960s and previously known as Broadgate Hill.

The oldest part of Warmington village is thought to be an area named Eaglethorpe, a small hamlet adjacent to the River Nene. A 1500-year-old skeleton was found during an archeological dig in Eaglethorpe during the completion of the A605 bypass in 2002.
