= A605 road =

Main road in the English counties of Northamptonshire and Cambridgeshire

A605

Major junctions
- West end: A14 near Thrapston
- A14 A427; A1 A1139
- East end: Hobbs Lot Bridge, near Guyhirn

Location
- Country: United Kingdom
- Primary destinations: Peterborough

Road network
- Roads in the United Kingdom; Motorways; A and B road zones

The A605 road is a main road in the English counties of Northamptonshire and Cambridgeshire.

== Route (west to east) ==
The A605 strikes north from junction 13 of the trunk A14 road through the eastern parts of Thrapston, skirts the village of Thorpe Waterville, bypasses Oundle to its east, crosses the River Nene, reaches the eastern limit of the A427 at a roundabout, skirts to the west of Eaglethorpe, crosses into Cambridgeshire near Elton Hall, to reach the A1(M)'s junction 17, whereupon it overlaps the A1 road. It then continues north east through Whittlesey before terminating at a junction with the A141 between March, Cambridgeshire and Guyhirn. Basically, except for a short section at Oundle, its route follows the south bank of the River Nene.

== History and improvements ==
The road used to start at the A6 just north of Higham Ferrers and run to Thrapston and Peterborough, following the line of the Roman Road between Irchester and Durobrivae (Wansford). The road split in two just before the A6 with one branch joining the A6 by the Irthlingborough Viaduct and the other at the top of the hill as the A6 enters Higham Ferrers. The later branch survives as a local access but the former has been returned to field.

In the early 1980s, development of the route from Northampton to Thrapston saw the building of a new section of the A605 mostly on line between Chown's Mill roundabout and the Stanwick roundabout. This was later dualled. A year later the Stanwick and Raunds Bypass was opened with land for dualling which, as of 2024, has not been carried out, despite the development of several large distribution centres off the Raunds roundabout hugely increasing HGV traffic. In the mid-1980s, the Ringstead and Denford Bypass was constructed from the Raunds roundabout to a grade separated interchange at Thrapston with the A14. With the completion of the route, the Chowns Mill roundabout to Thrapston roundabout section of the A605 was renumbered the A45 and the A45 to the east of Higham Ferrers was renumbered A4500. Thrapston is now the terminus of the A45 and the start of the A605.

Just before the A14 was built, a short section of the A605 was built bypassing Thrapston to the east to the A604 (as it was then known). This section began approximately 0.25 miles (400 m) northeast of Thrapston and terminated at a new roundabout on the A604, now merely an access to Thrapston industrial estate. The Thrapston Eastern Bypass was opened a few years later running northeast from this roundabout to a new junction with the old A605, just south of the Titchmarsh turn. Excavation of a Roman way station on the site of the junction proved disappointing, with no significant finds. The junction at the northeast end of Thrapston was converted to a roundabout around 2005. A bend was also eased between Titchmarsh turn and Thorpe Waterville. Around 2000 the A605 was widened between Thorpe Waterville and a new Lilford roundabout was constructed. An original milestone was unearthed and set on the side of the north east exit.

The road was improved from Barnwell turn to a new roundabout northeast of Oundle as the Oundle Bypass. This used the alignment of the former BR Northampton to Peterborough railway and crosses the River Nene twice in quick succession. The road was opened on 12 December 1985 by Princess Alice, Duchess of Gloucester and is commemorated by a plinth and brass plaque at the roundabout. A minor alignment change took place beyond here through the hamlet of Elmington. Beyond Elmington a curve was eased as the road climbed out of the valley and a new straightened section was constructed to a new roundabout for Warmington. The old road enters the garage just south of the roundabout. The Warmington Bypass was one of the last improvements on the A605 and was completed in 1996, including a section to the county boundary. The old road south of Warmington roundabout is now a garage access and the old road into Warmington can be seen on the right a short distance after the roundabout.

The Elton Bypass takes the A605 onto a new more southerly route to join the A1(M) at its northern terminus at Junction 17. This route then overlaps the A1 for 1 mile (1.6 km) to Alwalton where it regains its original route, heading northeast through Orton towards Peterborough. The bypassed section from Elton to Orton suffered from poor alignment and is now the B671 and a C road. The Elton Bypass climbs two hills and benefits from crawler lanes on both sections from both east and west.

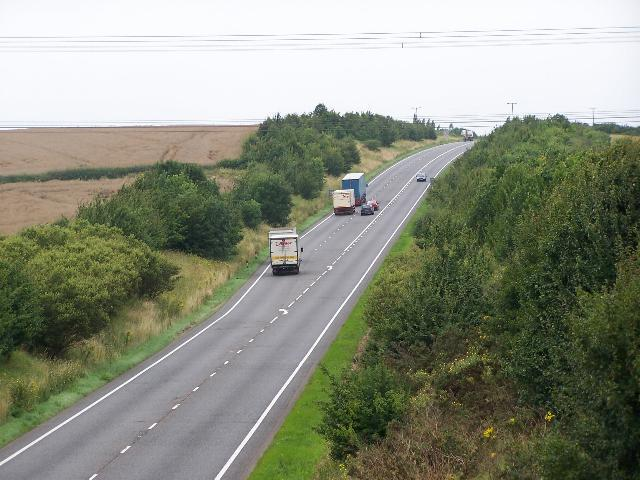
The A605 climbs two hills just west of the A1(M) with crawler lanes in both directions

East of the A1 the route approaching Peterborough has, in effect, become a local distributor as traffic for the A605 onward to Whittlesey/March etc. will use the parallel A1139 Peterborough Southern Bypass from Junction 17 on the A1(M). There are four new roundabouts between Alwalton and Orton. A diversion cuts a sharp corner between the third and fourth roundabouts. There is a limited access junction onto the A1260 Peterborough Western Bypass. The road passes under the East Coast Main Line and has a signalised junction with the A15 immediately south of Peterborough city's Nene Bridge. The road turns south and overlaps the A15 for a short way before originally diverging to the left and passing under the Peterborough Southern Bypass (the A1139) at Stanground. Finally, there is junction with the A1139 access road and the A605 turns east towards Whittlesey on what was once an old toll road.

In December 2009 a Stanground Bypass (mostly dual carriageway), was opened on the eastern approaches to Peterborough. This actually lengthens the route of the A605, although those using the A605 and Peterborough Bypass towards Whittlesey will find it shorter.

Around the year 2000 the severely damaged section from Thorpe Waterville to the Lilford roundabout was improved on line. This was the last section in Northamptonshire to be improved and had suffered badly from HGV with lorry ruts but the work was done on the cheap and the gridded gullies collapsed. The whole section was rebuilt with no gullies, crown drainage and soft verges in 2018.

== Incidents and Accidents ==
On 9 April 2017 a woman was found guilty of drink-driving on the road in a car with her newborn son in the back. Nobody was seriously injured, but a video of the crash went viral.

Two young men were killed in a crash near Oundle were both aged 20 and were from Northampton. They were passengers in a blue Vauxhall Corsa when it collided with a blue Ford Focus just after 2am on Sunday 7 May 2017, on the A605 at Elton.

A woman died following a collision on the A605 at Elton. The woman, from Nassington, was driving a green Nissan Micra on Thursday 11 May 2017, at about 10.20am when she was in collision with a lorry at the junction with the B671 Elton Junction at about 10.20am.

Emergency services were called at Elton on 25 June 2017 at about 5.40pm. The collision involved a white Suzuki Vitara, white Peugeot Partner and a black Peugeot 208. Sadly the driver of the Peugeot Partner, a man in his 50s, suffered fatal injuries.

In August 2017 a man from the Peterborough was killed in a collision between two vehicles, a Ford Focus and a Scania lorry, on the A605 near to Haddon services.

On 4 March 2018 at 6.05pm at Oundle, a silver Ford Fiesta travelling north, was in collision with a silver Renault Scenic and a grey Honda CRV travelling in the opposite direction. The driver of the Ford Fiesta, a 23-year-old man, was declared deceased at the scene. Five occupants of the Honda CRV were taken to Peterborough Hospital with serious injuries, one potentially life-threatening. The two occupants of the Renault Scenic were not injured.

== Numbering ==
At no point in its route does the A605 meet another A-road with a 6-series number. This apparent isolation is the result of it being truncated at its southern end, and the renumbering of the A604 (crossing at Thrapston), to the A14. It used to leave the A6 road at a junction north of Higham Ferrers but this stretch has been renumbered as the A45 road that terminates at the same A14 junction as the A605 now starts from. It is a matter of speculation why the whole of the A605 was not similarly renumbered. The A45 is an east–west road originally from Birmingham to Felixstowe so the north easterly direction of the A605 from the termination of the A45 at Thrapston does not coincide with that of the A45 whereas the A14 now completed that function.
