= New England, Peterborough =

Residential area of Peterborough, England

Coordinates: 52°35′45″N 0°15′15″W

New England is a residential area of Peterborough in the Peterborough district, in the ceremonial county of Cambridgeshire, England. For electoral purposes it forms part of Peterborough North ward. The area is bounded by Millfield to the south, Dogsthorpe to the east, the A47 (Soke Parkway) to the north and the A15 (Bourges Boulevard) to the west. The Faidhan-e-Madina Mosque opened here in 2003.

Railway lines began operating locally during the 1840s, but it was the 1850 opening of the Great Northern Railway's main line from London to York, that transformed Peterborough from a market town to an industrial centre. Relatively little urban development took place to the west of the railway, but the marshalling yards and other installations were labour-intensive and housing for railway workers and their families spread from the vicinity of the North station almost to Walton. The Great Northern built an entire community here, which provided much of the labour for the enormous marshalling yard and associated engine sheds close by.

The area falls within the ecclesiastical parish of Saint Paul and a Victorian church was erected at the Triangle in 1869. Fulbridge County Primary School is located in the area; following the closure of nearby Walton Comprehensive School in July 2007, secondary pupils attend Queen Katharine Academy which opened on the same site in September 2007.
