= Death of Lucy Meadows =

British teacher

- Date: 19 March 2013
- Location: England

Lucy Meadows (1981 – 19 March 2013), a transgender woman, was a teacher from Accrington in the United Kingdom. She died by suicide in March 2013 after the decision of her employers to allow her to return to work after sex reassignment surgery was covered in the national press.

== Background ==
Meadows grew up in a Christian family and married her partner Ruth Smith in 2009, prior to transitioning. Meadows and Smith separated in 2011, and at Christmas 2012, Meadows told her school about the transition.

== Press coverage of her transition ==
When the school sent an announcement to parents of her transition, local and national media outlets began to cover it as well as her return to a position as a teacher. The Daily Mail columnist Richard Littlejohn wrote an article repeatedly misgendering Meadows and criticising her decision to return to her job as a teacher.

On 3 January 2013, Meadows complained to the Press Complaints Commission (PCC) of "harassment from the press", specifically mentioning the Littlejohn article.

== Death and coroner's inquest ==
In March 2013, Meadows was found dead as a result of carbon monoxide poisoning, aged 32. At the inquest into Meadows' death, the coroner criticised the press for their handling of the story. According to The Guardian, he "singled out the Daily Mail as he accused the paper of 'ridicule and humiliation' and a 'character assassination' of Lucy Meadows". The coroner recommended that guidelines about press intrusion into the lives of the public be tightened.

== Reactions to her death ==
According to Lucy's ex-wife Ruth Smith, coverage by the Daily Mail, among others, was used to "attack a woman who wanted only to live her life in peace."

Writing in The Guardian, Paris Lees stated that Meadows had been "persecuted by the press" after her local newspaper reported on her transition.

A petition drive was launched demanding Littlejohn be fired from the Daily Mail. Two petitions signed by over 240,000 people were handed over to the Daily Mail offices.

Helen Belcher of Trans Media Watch said "I want people to come to their senses and realise the effect that coverage can have. Our politicians need to realise that trans people face real problems and the media is generally not helping – it is hindering. We need to sit up and listen, Lucy was being pursued by the press through the Christmas holiday and the new year. She had two weeks of constant harassment and monstering."

== See also ==
- 21st-century anti-trans movement in the United Kingdom
- LGBTQ rights in the United Kingdom
- Mental health in the United Kingdom
- Mental health of LGBTQ people
- Suicide among LGBTQ people
- Suicide in the United Kingdom
- Transgender rights in the United Kingdom
