= The War on Britain's Jews? =

- Written by: Richard Littlejohn
- Directed by: Dimitri Collingridge
- Narrated by: Richard Littlejohn
- Country of origin: United Kingdom
- Original language: English

Production
- Running time: 50 minutes

Original release
- Network: Channel 4
- Release: 9 July 2007

The War on Britain's Jews? is a 2007 documentary film by British journalist, broadcaster, writer and Daily Mail columnist Richard Littlejohn. It was first broadcast on Channel 4 television on 9 July 2007.

== Overview ==
The film was made in the wake of the September 2006 Report of the All-Party Parliamentary Inquiry into Antisemitism. The findings raised concerns about the spread of antisemitism in Britain, and highlighted the increase in violence, desecration of property, and intimidation directed against British Jews.

=== Littlejohn's view ===
Richard Littlejohn investigated trends of antisemitism as he travelled across the country. On 6 July 2007, he wrote in the Daily Mail:

When some people heard I was making the programme, their first reaction was: "I didn't know you were Jewish."

I'm not, but what's that got to do with the price of gefilte fish? They simply couldn't comprehend why a non-Jew would be in the slightest bit interested in investigating anti-Semitism.

If I had been making a film about Islamophobia, no one would have asked me if I was Muslim.

The Labour MP John Mann told me that he experienced the same reaction when he instigated a parliamentary inquiry into anti-Semitism.

'As soon as I set it up, the first MP who commented to me said: "Oh, I didn't know you were Jewish, John."' He isn't, either.

But the implication was plainly that the very idea of anti-Semitism is the invention of some vast Jewish conspiracy.

Mann's inquiry reported: "It is clear that violence, desecration, and intimidation directed towards Jews is on the rise. Jews have become more anxious and more vulnerable to attack than at any time for a generation or longer."

That certainly bears out my own findings. After three months filming across Britain, I reached the conclusion: It's open season on the Jews.

Part of the film shows security measures at a Jewish school in Manchester. In an interview, Littlejohn says:

I was horrified with what I saw going on there. Chief Constable Mike Todd took me to the school and it's got razor wire around it and bomb-proof windows. I said to him "This has got to be over the top, hasn't it?" And he said "No, there is a very real threat."

According to Littlejohn, the BBC had originally approached him in 2005 to make an "authored documentary" on any subject he felt passionately about. They did not pursue the idea after learning Littlejohn's intention, which included the thesis that "the motive force behind the recent increase in anti-Jewish activity comes from the Fascist Left and the Islamonazis."

== Reception ==
In the Guardian, Gareth McLean noted that "Richard Littlejohn lecturing on the evils of bigotry is akin to Hannibal Lecter advocating vegetarianism." He added, "there has been an alarming rise in anti-semitic hate crime recently in the UK, and [Littlejohn] endeavours to find out why the one minority he doesn't pick on is so vilified by everyone from bad Muslims to bad lefties to the far right."

In the Daily Telegraph, Gerard O'Donovan wrote:

What Littlejohn was at particular pains to point out was that it isn't the usual suspects – ie the brain-dead of the far right – who are solely responsible for this rise in antisemitism. But, rather, extremist elements in Britain's Muslim community and, surprise, surprise, the political left.

The bone of contention here, of course, was the state of Israel and its abhorrent treatment of Palestinians. But whereas it may be inarguable that many in Britain's Muslim community bear openly antisemitic attitudes for this reason, Littlejohn's attack on the political left-wing was less convincing. Undoubtedly those on the left who express support for the rabidly anti-Israeli stance of Hizbollah and other pro-terror organisations are deeply hypocritical, if not unhinged. But the idea that any criticism of Israel's government is in itself somehow antisemitic is simply a fallacy. Politics and prejudice can, indeed must, be separated in this instance.

Overall though, this was an excellent and provocative TV polemic that certainly left viewers with much to think about. Not only with regard to the sort of violence and hostility that most decent people would have thought to be largely a thing of the past but to smaller, more insidious things, too. Like the fact that Littlejohn could walk into a newsagent's on the Edgware Road in London and find an Arabic translation of Hitler's Mein Kampf openly on sale "alongside the Evening Standards, the AutoTraders and the Milky bars". How obscene is that?

In the Times, Andrew Billen wrote:

Since 2001, antiSemitic incidents have almost doubled to 594 last year, which, Littlejohn calculated, was "more than ten every week".

Littlejohn's presentation was hindered by his addiction to cliché. "You don't have to be an antiSemite to hate Israel but it helps," he joshed. And: "Just because you are paranoid doesn't mean they are not out to get you." But when he stuck to the facts he was all right. The BNP is at heart Jew-hating. AntiSemitism is openly expressed in the Middle East. (But then we knew that.) Where he faltered was in his attempts to prove that anti-Semitism had "entered the mainstream" and that the Left, "who pride themselves on their antiracist credentials" were "some of the worst offenders".

To make that assertion, I assumed, he must have found some pretty juicy quotes from mainstream Leftists. But beyond a marcher's placard, "We are All Hezbollah Now", he hadn't. Peter Wilby, the former editor of the New Statesman – who once foolishly published an anti-Zionist-looking cover (and then apologised) – posited an alternative theory. The Left passionately opposes Israel's conduct and its criticism sometimes spills into anti-Semitism, but, no, being against Israel was not a "cloak" for antiSemitism. Personally, I'm with Wilby.

Not, of course, that I would accuse Littlejohn of impugning the motives of others. That would make him no better than a critic who thought his hunt for anti-Semitic Lefties was, in reality, a search for a stick – any stick – with which to beat the Left. Such a critic might as well accuse Channel 4 of trying to discredit a legitimate concern about the rhetoric used against Israel by employing a hack not quite up to the task.

== See also ==
- Antisemitism
- New antisemitism
- History of the Jews in England
