= Peterborough Power Station =

British gas-fired power station

Coordinates: 52.5769°N 0.204°W

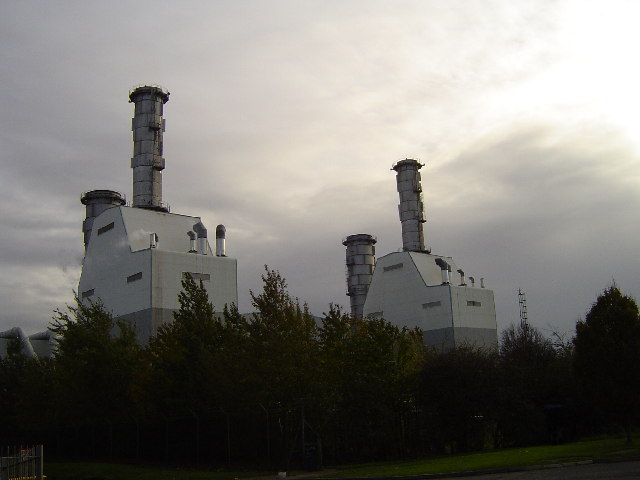
The Power Station, Fengate, Peterborough.

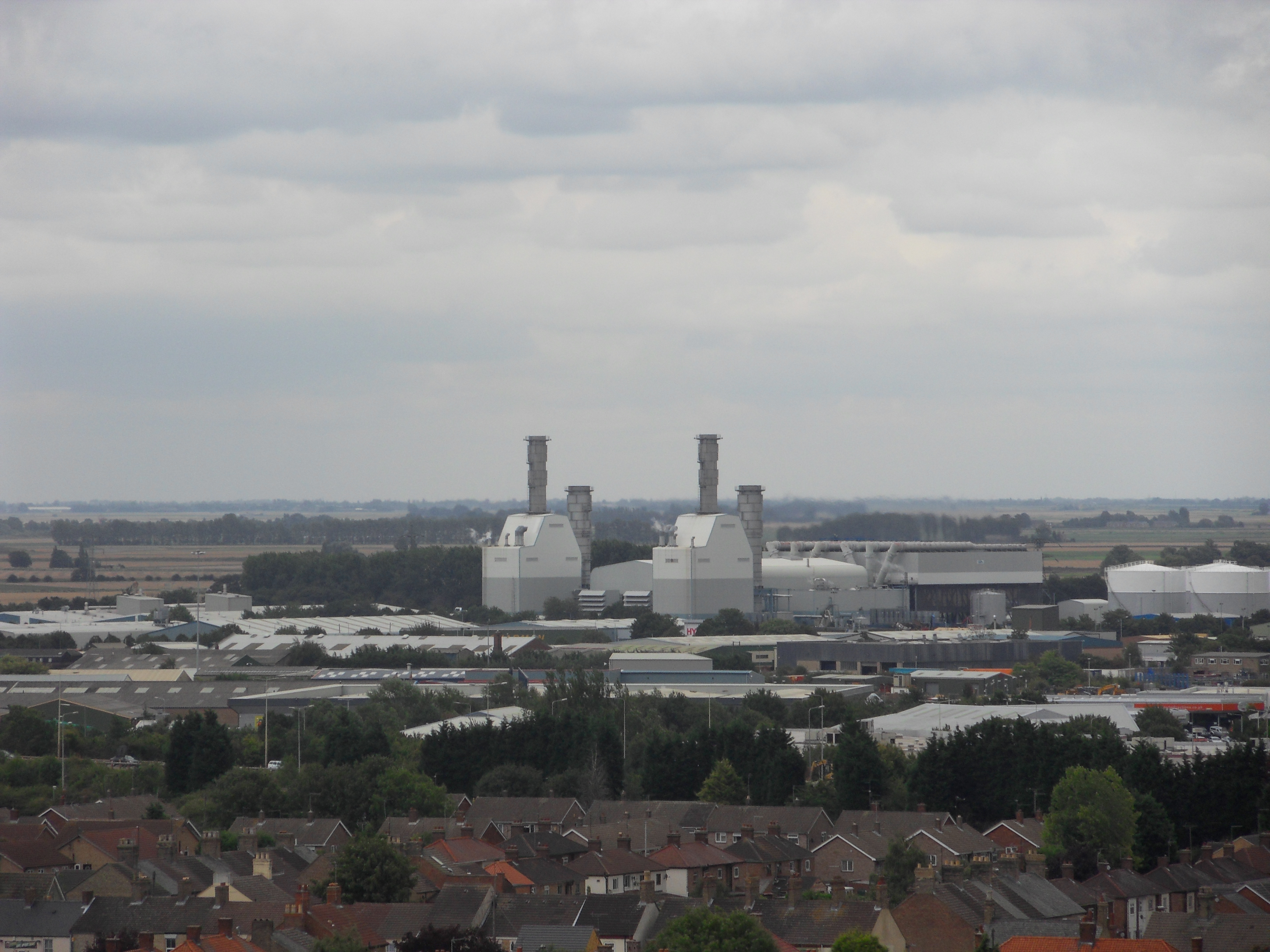
The power station, as seen from the central tower of Peterborough Cathedral.

Peterborough Power Station is a 360 MW gas-fired power station at Eastern Industry, Fengate in the city of Peterborough, Cambridgeshire in the United Kingdom. It employs around forty people.

The power station was commissioned in December 1993 with construction starting in January 1991. It is currently owned by Whitetower Holdings UK Limited, an affiliate of Rockland Capital, LP after a £20M agreement was made with Centrica Energy officially owned by Centrica PB Ltd. Peterborough Power Ltd, the station's original operating name, was bought by Centrica Plc from Dallas-based TXU Corp. in October 2001. Centrica was created in 1997 when British Gas Plc demerged into Centrica Plc and BG Group Plc; it owns the rights to the British Gas name for use in the domestic market.

A previous coal-fired power station in Peterborough was located on the north side of the river, on the site of what is now the Rivergate shopping centre. Demolished in the mid 1980s, all that remains is its substation on the other side of the river, directly south from the power station's former site.

== Technical specifications ==
Peterborough is a CCGT type power station that runs on natural gas. The two General Electric Frame 9E gas turbines, each producing 118 MWe which connect to a heat recovery steam generator powered by exhaust gases at 530 °C (986 °F) which leads to one steam turbine running at 3,000 rpm. The generators on the gas turbines have a terminal voltage of 14 kV and are rated at 161MVA.

The installation produces enough power for two cities the size of Peterborough. Including the steam turbine, it has a thermal efficiency of 48% with a total thermal input of 790 MW. The plant has a black start 2.9 MW diesel generator and connects to the National Grid at 132 kV. It is used for base load and peak load, where it can temporarily produce 400 MWe, although actual power depends on local humidity and temperature. The chimneys are 197 feet (60 m) and 148 feet (45 m) high.

=== Water management ===
There is an air-cooled condenser to eliminate the need for cooling water. It makes use of a grey water supply provided by Anglian Water’s nearby sewage treatment plant. This grey water prevents the use of clean potable water from the city's supply and reduces the unnecessary use of chemicals to regenerate the ion exchange resins which are used to de-mineralise the water to protect the power station's boilers and steam turbine.

== Coal-fired power station ==
Peterborough City Corporation had owned and operated local electricity supplies from the turn of the twentieth century until the nationalisation of the electricity industry in 1948. The coal-fired power station at Peterborough was located near Town Bridge on the north side of the River Nene. River water was used for condensing steam and for cooling in the station. The power station had high pressure (HP) and low pressure (LP) plant, referring to the steam conditions. In 1961 the oldest LP plant had been installed in 1928 and the oldest in the HP plant in 1951.

The HP plant had an installed capacity of 40 megawatts (MW) from two English Electric 20 MW turbo-alternators with the first installed in March 1951. There were three Babcock water tube pulverised fuel boilers each rated at 160,000 lb/hr (20.16 kg/s), giving a total capacity of 480,000 lb/hr (60.48 kg/s), the HP steam conditions were 400 psi (27.6 bar) and 427 °C. (Some sources state 425 psi and 825 °F (441 °C)). The HP plant had a single reinforced concrete chimney.

The LP plant had an installed generating capacity of 18 MW, from one 12.5 MW and one 5.5 MW Peter Brotherhood- English Electric turbo-alternators. The total boiler capacity was 210,000 lb/hr (26.4 kg/s) from three Spearling pulverised fuel boilers and the steam conditions were lower than the HP plant at 230 psi (15.9 bar) and 343/371 °C. (Some sources state 260 psi and 750 °F (399 °C)). The LP plant had a single slender chimney, the plant was decommissioned in 1968.

Cooling water for condensing steam was drawn from the River Nene.

In 1961 the total electricity output from the LP plant was 8.76 GWh, while the output from HP plant was 113.277 GWh.

Total electricity output, in GWh, over the period 1954–77

Peterborough power station was decommissioned in 1977 and demolished in the mid-1980s.
