= St John Fisher Catholic High School, Peterborough =

St John Fisher Catholic High School

Location
- Park Lane; Peterborough, Cambridgeshire, PE1 5JN; England; 52.580399°N 0.225074°W

Information
- Type: Voluntary aided school
- Motto: "I have come that they may have life and have it to the full"
- Religious affiliation: Roman Catholic
- Established: 1956
- Local authority: Peterborough
- Department for Education URN: 110907 Tables
- Ofsted: Reports
- Head teacher: Natasha Wilmore
- Gender: Coeducational
- Age: 11 to 18
- Website: www.stjohnfisherschool.org.uk

St John Fisher Catholic High School, formerly known as St. John Fisher RC Comprehensive School, is in the city of Peterborough, England, and is the only Catholic school in Cambridgeshire. The school moved back to the Park Lane site and was reopened on 25 February 2009.

== Sixth form ==
The school has a sixth form with approximately half of Year 11 staying on each year to complete A level courses. Many A level subjects are offered, some of which are taught at The King's School through a collaborative arrangement.

== Inspection ==
A dip in performance saw the school placed in special measures from 2008 to 2010. Improvement saw the school judged Good in October 2013. The corresponding Diocesan Inspection judged it to be an outstanding Catholic school.

As of 2024, the school's most recent inspection by Ofsted was in 2023, confirming the judgement of Good.

== Modernisation ==
When the school was given over fourteen million pounds to modernise their buildings and facilities it was felt that the school itself needed to be modernised also. The school name changed to 'St. John Fisher Catholic High School', the school timetable changed from six lessons a day to four 75-minute lessons, and a new uniform and a new school logo were added. The school opened on 25 February 2009 in their old site with new facilities, buildings and a new look.

Executive head teacher Sean Hayes was appointed as permanent head teacher.
