= KingsGate Community Church =

Kingsgate Community Church
- KingsGate Community Church logo
- Kingsgate Community Church
- Country: England
- Denomination: Independent
- Website: kingsgate.church

History
- Founded: 1988

KingsGate Community Church is a Christian megachurch, originating in Peterborough, England. The church was established in 1988, originally called Peterborough Community Church, by Dave and Karen Smith.

== History ==
Its first service in 1988, held in a house, was attended by nine people.

In 2006, the congregation moved into its new, £7m, 84,000sq ft building, which in addition to meeting rooms, offices, kitchen facilities and children's rooms, contains an auditorium which will eventually seat 1,800 people.

KingsGate Community Church has four centres. In September 2010, KingsGate launched a new centre in Cambridge. In February 2014, KingsGate launched a new centre in Leicester. In October 2018, KingsGate launched their fourth centre in London which closed in Covid. They now also have an online campus.

In 2017, the church has 2,200 people.

== Music ==
KingsGate have produced two live albums, featuring original songs by the church. Their first album, Faithful, was released in 2013, followed by Now More Than Ever, released in 2016, which reached 6th in the Official UK Christian & Gospel Albums Charts.

== Network ==
There are affiliated churches in Cambridge, Leicester, and London.
