= Stamford College, Lincolnshire =

Further education college in Stamford, Lincolnshire, England

Stamford College
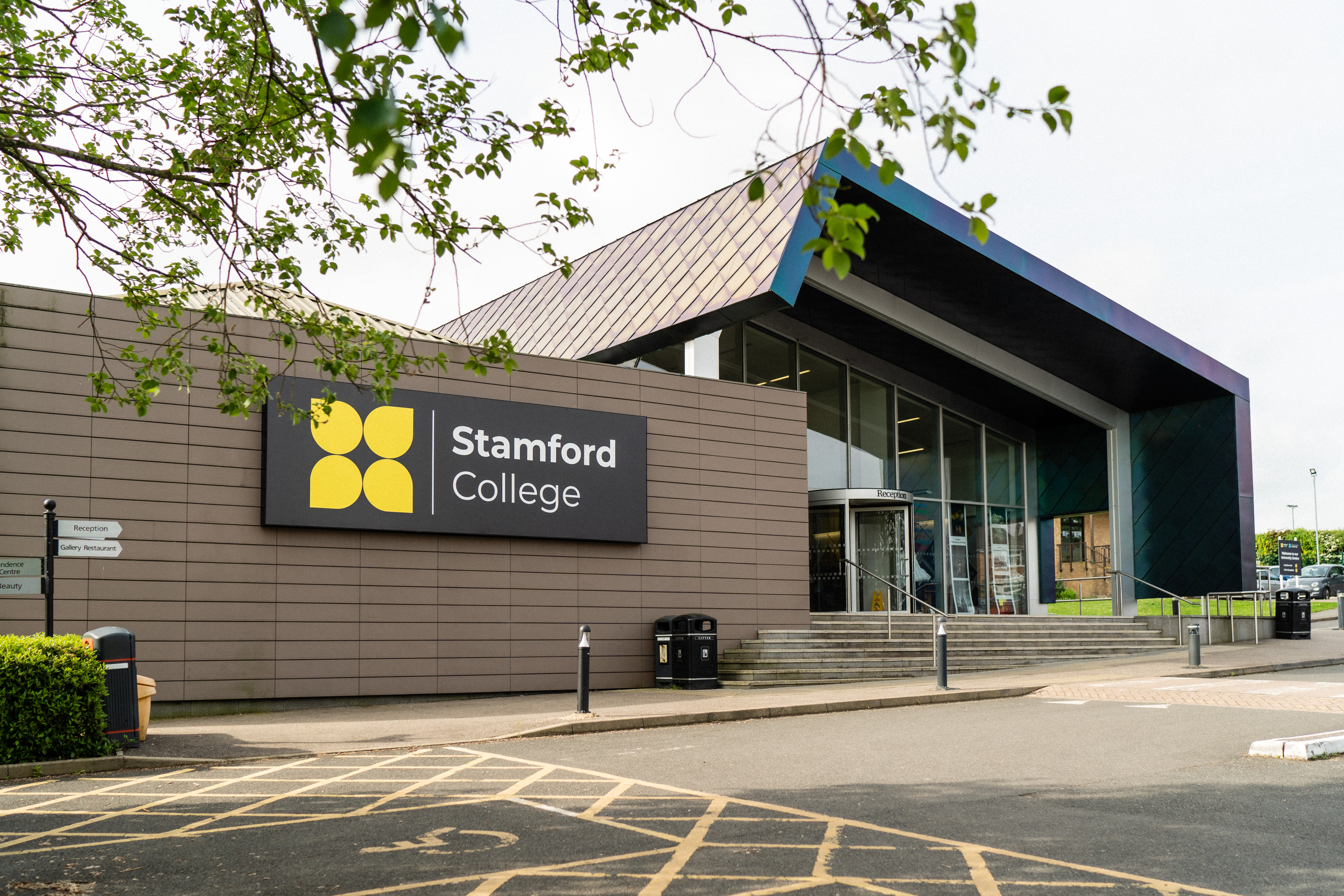

Location
- Drift Road; Stamford, Lincolnshire, PE9 1XA; England; 52°39′30″N 0°28′15″W

Information
- Motto: Achieve excellence, be outstanding
- Established: 1967
- Department for Education URN: 130760 Tables
- Ofsted: Reports
- Gender: Coeducational
- Age: 16+
- Website: www.stamford.ac.uk

Stamford College is a further education college on Drift Road in Stamford, Lincolnshire, England. It opened as Stamford Technical College in 1967 and was later called New College Stamford, becoming Stamford College in 2020.

It is now a general further education college that provides full-time and part-time academic and vocational courses.

== Courses ==
The curriculum is aimed at 16 to 18 year-olds, sixth-formers and those taking higher education and vocational further education within full or part-time courses. It includes courses in business studies, art and design, entertaining, music, dance, drama, broadcasting, television, radio, journalism, land-based science, medicine, nursing, fashion, textiles, crafts, traditional trowel trades, carpentry, joinery, childcare, computing, catering, sport, public services and motor vehicles.

Further education qualification study is provided for A-Level, BTEC and NVQ in Computing, Multimedia, Health and Social Care, Pre-Uniform Services (NCFE), Sciences, Arts, Construction, Sports, Animal Care, Hair and Beauty and Catering.

== Partnerships and status ==
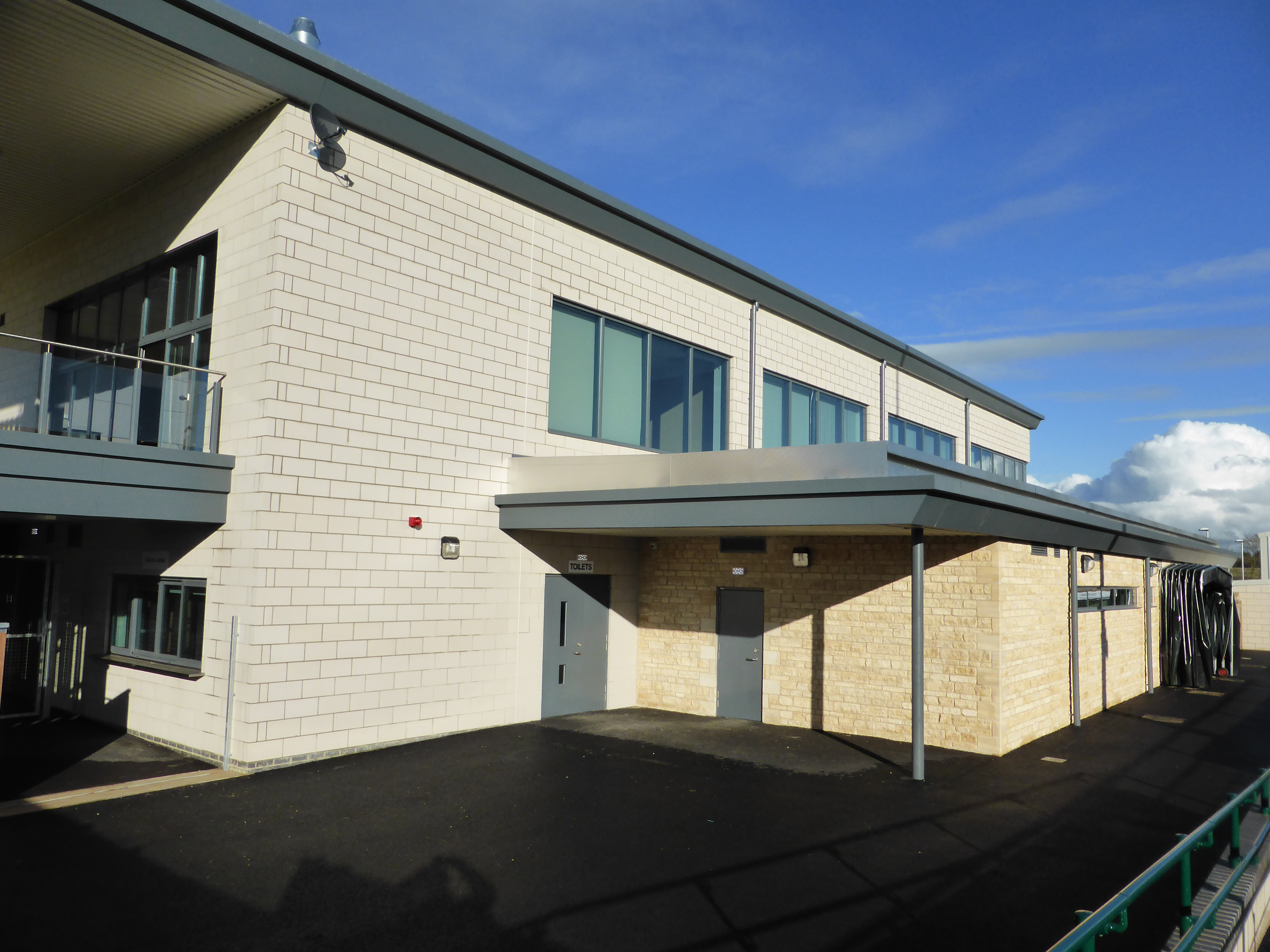
The new Sports Hall at the Borderville Sports Centre

From 2006, the college has worked in association with Bishop Grosseteste which provide validation for University level courses.

In February 2008 the college became the only further education college in the area to provide AS and A2 levels, when Peterborough Regional College announced that it would be focusing on becoming a non-academic vocational college. The same year, the college developed a sixth form academy for A-Level study.

NCS was awarded Beacon status in 2009.

In 2014, the college collaborated with Stamford A.F.C. on the establishment of the Borderville Sports Centre on land provided by the Burghley Estate, at Borderville on Ryhall Road, north of town.

== Ofsted ==
In 2006, Ofsted rated NCS as Grade 2 "Good", including effectiveness of provision, capacity to improve, achievements and standards, quality of provision and leadership as well as management

Some key areas were identified for improvement; milestones towards completion of targets were not specific enough or linked to quantifiable indicators to enable a clear and detailed view of progress. It was stated that the college needed to improve retention rates, the planning for and the development of learning and the quality of its self-assessment.

Since the 2006 Ofsted inspection, the problems have been rectified, as was noted in the annual assessment visit of 2007.

== Notable alumni ==
- David Malinowski – BAFTA and Oscar winning special effects make-up artist.
