= John Mansfield School =

Location
- Western Avenue; Peterborough, Cambridgeshire, PE1 4HX; England; 52°35′56″N 0°13′53″W

Information
- Established: c. 1950s
- Closed: 2007
- Local authority: Peterborough
- Department for Education URN: 110876 Tables
- Ofsted: Reports
- Headteacher: Christopher Walford
- Gender: Coeducational
- Age: 11 to 18
- Enrolment: 774

John Mansfield School was located in the Dogsthorpe area of Peterborough, England. The school opened in 1957, when the estate had just been completed, and was originally an all-girls school for those who failed the 11+. In 1981, it became a mixed school open to all students from year 7 to post 16. In 2007 the school was closed and merged with two other schools, Deacon's Secondary School and Hereward Community College. The new school was relocated and called the Thomas Deacon Academy of Peterborough.

The school was opened in 1957 and was named after local councillor John Mansfield. In the mid-1970s the school became a mixed comprehensive school. It achieved excellent 'Value Added'results and received recognition as an improved school three years running. In 1995 the school began teaching sixth form courses and won Government School Achievement Awards in 2001 and 2002. In 2006 it was named the 53rd most improved school in Britain.

In 2003 it was announced that the school would close and students would go to a new academy. The head teacher fought against the planned action and had a great deal of support from the local community. A few former students openly welcomed the idea in the local press after a misleading letter was published by one of the supporters of the campaign. The school closed in July 2007.

The school had facilities for performing arts, with two art studios, several music rooms, a dance studio and a drama studio. Other additions to the school included an English/Design Technology/Maths block. It also had three Information Technology suits.
