= Woodston, Peterborough =

Area of Peterborough, England

Coordinates: 52.562°N 0.256°W

Woodston
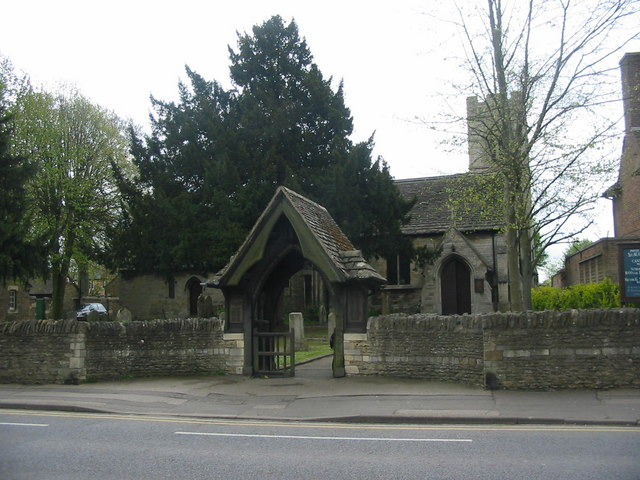
- Church of St Augustine at Woodston

- Location within Cambridgeshire
- Unitary authority: Peterborough
- Ceremonial county: Cambridgeshire
- Region: East
- Country: England
- Sovereign state: United Kingdom
- Post town: PETERBOROUGH
- Postcode district: PE2
- Dialling code: 01733

Woodston is a largely residential and industrial area of the city of Peterborough, in the ceremonial county of Cambridgeshire, England. For electoral purposes, it forms part of Fletton ward in North West Cambridgeshire constituency. Oundle Road runs through most of Woodston into the Ortons.

== Administration ==
Situated south of the River Nene, the area was historically part of Huntingdonshire, rather than the Soke of Peterborough in Northamptonshire. From 1874 part of the parish was included within the municipal borough of Peterborough. When elected county counciles were established in 1889 boroughs were placed entirely in the county which contained the majority of their population, and so after 1889 Woodston parish straddled the administrative counties of Huntingdonshire and Soke of Peterborough. In 1891 the parish had a population of 1836. The civil parish of Woodston was divided under the provisions of the Local Government Act 1894 into Woodston Rural parish in Huntingdonshire (of 984 acres) and Woodston Urban parish in the borough of Peterborough (70 acres). In 1905, Woodston Rural became part of Old Fletton Urban District. On 1 April 1938 Woodstone Rural was renamed "Woodston". In 1951 the (Rural) parish had a population of 2800. On 1 April 1974 the parish was abolished.

The ecclesiastical parish of Saint Augustine of Canterbury in the Diocese of Ely remained undivided; although this has now been placed under the pastoral care of the Bishop of Peterborough, acting as Assistant Bishop in the Diocese of Ely. Woodston cemetery, which opened on New Road in 1882, is closed for new burials.

== Industry ==
Until 2008, Woodston was the home of white goods manufacturer Hotpoint, a subsidiary of the General Electric Company from 1929 until its dissolution in 1989. Established in 1911, Hotpoint is now owned by the Italian Indesit Company S.p.A.; its former Redring subsidiary, which is still based here, is now a brand of Applied Energy Products Ltd., alongside Creda and Xpelair. British Sugar, previously headquartered on Oundle Road, has now moved to Hampton. The sugar beet factory on Oundle Road which opened in 1926 was closed in 1991. Since the demolition of the sugar factories, new homes have appeared in place of the site.SodaStream was based in the area until 2003 and Pedigree Petfoods, a division of Mars Ltd., opened a factory on Shrewsbury Avenue 1974, it subsequently closed and was demolished in 2013/14. Johnston Press Ltd also operated one of their printing press sites on Oundle Road in Woodston until its closure in 2012.

== Amenities ==
Woodston County Primary, Brewster Avenue Infant and St. Augustine's Church of England (Voluntary Aided) Junior schools are located in the area; secondary pupils attend nearby Stanground College, and Nene Park Academy, formally known as Orton Longueville Comprehensive School.

The Grade I-listed St. Augustine's Church dates from Anglo-Saxon times.

== See also ==
- Woodston Ponds
- St Olga Ukrainian Catholic Church
