= St Peter and All Souls, Peterborough =

Church in Peterborough, Cambridgeshire, England

Coordinates: 52°34′35.4″N 0°14′33.8″W

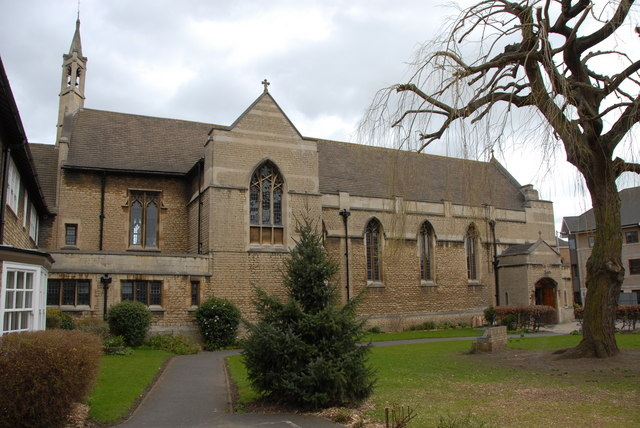

The church of St Peter and All Souls is a Roman Catholic church in Peterborough, on Park Road, north of the city centre. It has been part of the Diocese of East Anglia since 1976, having fallen under the Diocese of Northampton from its building in 1896 until then. St Olga Ukrainian Catholic Church is a Ukrainian Catholic mission that is part of the church.

The church and presbytery, built by Leonard Stokes in 1896, are decorated in the Gothic style. Both the church and the presbytery are Grade II listed buildings. The church is built of stone with a stone tile roof.
