= Dogsthorpe =

Area of Peterborough in Cambridgeshire, England

Coordinates: 52.5979°N 0.2199°W

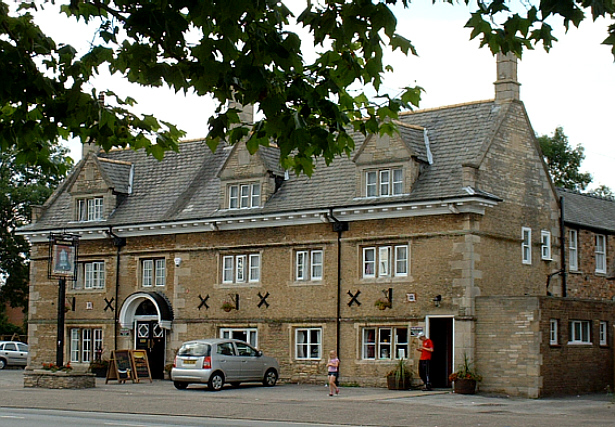
- The Blue Bell Inn, Dogsthorpe, Peterborough

- Location within Cambridgeshire
- Population: 9,620
- OS grid reference: TF205015
- Unitary authority: Peterborough
- Ceremonial county: Cambridgeshire
- Region: East
- Country: England
- Sovereign state: United Kingdom
- Post town: Peterborough
- Postcode district: PE1
- Dialling code: 01733
- Police: Cambridgeshire
- Fire: Cambridgeshire
- Ambulance: East of England

Dogsthorpe is a residential area and electoral ward of the city of Peterborough, in the Peterborough district, in the ceremonial county of Cambridgeshire, England. The population of the ward at the 2021 Census was 11,500. Cambridgeshire Fire and Rescue Service maintain a fire station, crewed day and night and equipped with Water Tender, Rescue Vehicle and Aerial Platform, on Dogsthorpe Road.

Dogsthorpe County Infant and Junior and All Saints Church of England (Voluntary Aided) Junior schools are located in the area; following the closure of John Mansfield School in July 2007, secondary pupils attend the Thomas Deacon Academy which opened in September 2007. Marshfields, a special school for pupils aged 10–19 with moderate learning difficulties, is also located here.

== History ==
Dogsthorpe was originally the hamlet of Dodsthorpe, which gave its name to a township within the parish, centred on Peterborough, of Saint John the Baptist. The main part of Dodsthorpe township was north of Peterborough and west of the township of Newark-with-Eastfield, but included a small detached portion to the east of both.

== Welland Estate ==
The adjacent Welland Estate was designed by Brian Ward in the 1960s and based on the Radburn design housing layout from the United States, which separates cars from housing so that the majority of houses are accessible from the front only by footpaths. A downside of this design is that it creates poor surveillance particularly for cars parked at the rear of the estate. However, a benefit is that it contains extensive green spaces, footpaths and alleyways linking streets in and around the estate.

== See also ==
- Dogsthorpe Star Pit
- Deacon's School
