= St Olga Ukrainian Catholic Church =

- Saint Olga Ukrainian Catholic Church
- Location in Cambridgeshire
- 52°33′45″N 0°15′14″W
- Location: Peterborough, Cambridgeshire
- Country: England
- Denomination: Roman Catholic
- Churchmanship: Ukrainian Greek Catholic Church

History
- Founded: 1964
- Dedication: Saint Olga of Kiev

Administration
- Diocese: Roman Catholic Diocese of East Anglia

St Olga Ukrainian Catholic Church, Woodston, Peterborough, England was built in 1964, and named for Olga of Kyiv. There is a Ukrainian Mission based in this church. The parish priest is Fr Roman Badiak.

It is part of the Ukrainian Greek Catholic Church and the Apostolic Exarchate for Ukrainians while also being part of the Catholic Church in England and Wales. It is part of the Catholic parish of St Peter and All Souls, Peterborough.
