= City College Peterborough =

College in Cambridgeshire, England

- Established: 1970 (1944 Adult Institute)
- Principal: Tasha Dalton
- Location: Brook Street, Peterborough, Cambridgeshire PE1 1TU
- Website: citycollegepeterborough.ac.uk

City College Peterborough is an adult and community learning college in the city of Peterborough in the United Kingdom.

Established in 1970, as Peterborough College of Adult Education (PCAE), the college traces its origins to 1944, with the opening of the Adult Education Institute, which became part of Peterborough Technical College in 1946. It relocated to its own premises on Brook Street in 1970 and adopted the present name in 2010.

The college offers a range of courses, qualifications and accreditations for students of all ages, levels and interests, including apprenticeship programmes, workplace training, distance and supported learning.

== See also ==
- Peterborough Regional College
