= Queen Katharine Academy =

Location
- Mountsteven Avenue; Peterborough, Cambridgeshire, PE4 6HX; England; 52°36′27″N 00°16′07″W

Information
- Type: Academy
- Established: 2007
- Local authority: Peterborough
- Trust: Thomas Deacon Education Trust
- Specialist: Arts
- Department for Education URN: 145051 Tables
- Ofsted: Reports
- Principal: Mark Taylor
- Gender: Mixed
- Age: 11 to 18
- Enrolment: 1645
- Website: http://www.qka.education/

The Queen Katharine Academy (formerly The Voyager Academy and The Voyager School) is a secondary school with academy status in Peterborough in the United Kingdom. The school was formed in 2007 by the amalgamation of Walton Community School and Bretton Woods Community School.

== Development ==
The development of The Voyager School began in September 2003 when consultation began on the £100 million transformation of secondary schools in Peterborough. Four schools were planned for the city and seven schools would be refurbished or expanded.

In 2004, the decision to create these new schools and to close both Walton Community School and Bretton Woods Community School was made. Both schools were to be merged to form The Voyager School, with £26 million of investment.

In January 2005, the headteacher of TVS was announced, Hugh Howe. He would oversee the development and then become the headteacher when the school opened in September 2007. He was known for having improved new and failing schools.

In February 2005, the building contractor for what was then called North School was debated. The city decided on Bouygues Education/Mills group, a French company, well known for its educational building project, to begin construction in March 2006.

In March 2006 the Voyager School launched its bid to become Peterborough's first Media Arts College. The bid offered local businesses the opportunity of helping the school achieve the £50,000 sponsorship necessary to draw on government funding of £1 million.

The predecessor schools held transition events to promote team building, leadership and innovate skills. The first of these in February 2007 was used to create the Voyager School Senior Executive Group (SEG), a form of student leadership within the school where a group of six students would work to create and manage the leadership scheme of The Voyager with Deputy Headteacher, Jane Mullan.

The Voyager School achieved Media Arts Status in January–February 2007 following an application to the Department for Education and Skills.

In the summer of 2016, the school partnered with the Thomas Deacon Academy to form the Thomas Deacon Academy Education Trust. In 2017, the school announced a name change to Queen Katharine Academy.

== School performance ==
In 2008 the school received its first sets of results. The A-Level results were good, but only 23% of students achieved the benchmark of 5 GCSE passes at A*–C including English and mathematics. A report in the Evening Telegraph suggested the school had been given 12 months to improve.

However, the school's first Ofsted inspection in November 2008 noted several good features of the school, and stated that the school had created the effective management needed to overcome a legacy of low achievement at the predecessor schools.

As of 2025, the school's last inspection by Ofsted was in March 2025, with judgements of:

- Quality of education: Inadequate
- Behaviour and attitudes: Inadequate
- Personal development: Requires Improvement
- Leadership and management: Requires Improvement
- Sixth form provision: Good

As the school "was judged to require significant improvement", it was issued a termination warning notice following this inspection.

== Notable former students ==
=== Walton Community School ===
- Paul Blades, footballer
- Luke Pasqualino, actor
