= Deacon's School =

Location
- Queen's Gardens; Peterborough, Cambridgeshire, PE1 2UW; England
- Coordinates: 52°35′15″N 0°14′11″W

Information
- Type: Foundation school
- Religious affiliation: Church of England
- Established: 1721
- Founder: Thomas Deacon
- Closed: 2007
- Local authority: Peterborough
- Department for Education URN: 110901 Tables
- Headteacher: Michael Griffiths
- Gender: Coeducational
- Age: 11 to 18
- Enrolment: 1059
- Fate: Closed and rebuilt in 2007 to become an academy

Deacon's School was a school in Dogsthorpe, Peterborough, England. In 2007, the school was demolished and replaced by the Thomas Deacon Academy.

== History ==
The school opened in 1721 as Mr. Deacon's Charity School in Cowgate. In his will, Thomas Deacon, a successful wool merchant, provided for the creation of a school for 20 poor boys. In the 1830s, Deacon's School merged with The Island School for Girls, which had been established by a Mrs Island in her will.

=== Grammar school ===
New accommodation for the school was built on Queen's Gardens in Dogsthorpe, opened in 1960 as Deacon's Grammar School. It was a voluntary aided school with about 450 boys in the 1960s.

A team of four boys appeared on Top of the Form against Kings Norton Grammar School for Girls, broadcast on Sunday 22 October 1967 on the new BBC Radio 2, which was recorded on Tuesday 19 September 1967. The team included future journalist Richard Littlejohn, aged 13. It was recorded in the school hall with John Ellison; Tim Gudgin was at Kings Norton.

=== Comprehensive ===
It became a voluntary controlled co-educational comprehensive school in 1976. It became a grant maintained school in the 1990s and applied to become a Technology College, becoming a specialist school in 1994. The building remained in Dogsthorpe for 47 years until the Academy was built on the same site. Administration moved from Cambridgeshire to Peterborough in 1998.

The Deacon's School Trust (now known as Thomas Deacon Foundation), created by Thomas Deacon's will, partially funds the Academy with Perkins Engines. The school merged with John Mansfield School on Western Avenue and the Hereward Community College (a former secondary modern school on Reeves Way in Eastfield) to form a £46m Academy. Plans were approved on 11 August 2004, and it was originally due to open in 2006 and cost £34m. Construction began in July 2005.

== Notable former pupils ==
Deacon's Grammar School

- John Challens CBE, Director of the Atomic Weapons Establishment (AWE) from 1976 to 1978, designed the electrical circuits for Britain's first nuclear bomb test
- Ron Jacobs, rugby player, later President of the Rugby Football Union (RFU)
- Richard Littlejohn, columnist with the Daily Mail
- Don Lusher OBE, jazz trombonist
- Leonard Rosoman OBE, artist
- Prof Roy Severn CBE FREng, Professor of Civil Engineering from 1968 to 1995 at the University of Bristol, President from 1991 to 1992 of the Institution of Civil Engineers
- Lloyd Watson, blues guitarist
- Mark Wildman, snooker player, made the first televised century break in November 1960.

Deacon's School

- Ajaz Akhtar (1968–), cricketer
- Adrian Durham, radio presenter
- Matthew Etherington, footballer
- MJ Hibbett, singer-songwriter
