= Parnwell =

Coordinates: 52°35′43″N 0°12′23″W

Parnwell is residential area of the city of Peterborough, in the Peterborough district, in the ceremonial county of Cambridgeshire, England. For electoral purposes, it forms part of the east ward. Development in Parnwell began in the early 1990s, with most of the buildings being council housing and flats.

Parnwell County Primary School is located in the area; following the closure of nearby Hereward Community College in July 2007, secondary pupils attend the flagship Thomas Deacon Academy which opened in September 2007.
