= Newark, Peterborough =

Former hamlet of Petersborough

Coordinates: 52°35′27″N 0°12′35″W

Newark was a hamlet of the parish of Saint Mary the Virgin in the Soke of Peterborough in the United Kingdom. One mile and a half (2.4 km) north-east-by-east from the city centre; a portion was incorporated with the municipal borough in 1874. The remainder formed part of Peterborough Rural District from 1894 until 1926 when the city's boundaries were extended to include the civil parish of Peterborough Without.

== History ==
St. Michael's church school was erected in the village in 1873 and had a chancel containing a stained-glass window and a font; divine service was held by the clergy of St. Mary's, Peterborough. The population, including Eastfield, in 1891 was 388.

Oxney Grange, a Grade II listed building dating to the 12th century, was destroyed by fire in 2003. The estate of Oxney (or Oxanige) was originally purchased for Thorney Abbey in 966 and was acquired by Saint Æthelwold in 972 for the revived Abbey at Peterborough, in whose possession it remained until the dissolution of the monasteries.

== Sport ==
A greyhound racing track was opened during 1931. The racing was independent (not affiliated to the sports governing body the National Greyhound Racing Club) known as a flapping track, which was the nickname given to independent tracks. The track raced on Monday and Friday day times. The date of closure is not known.
