= Fengate, Peterborough =

Area of Peterborough, England

Coordinates: 52.571°N 0.221°W

Fengate
- Location within Cambridgeshire
- Unitary authority: Peterborough
- Ceremonial county: Cambridgeshire
- Region: East
- Country: England
- Sovereign state: United Kingdom
- Post town: PETERBOROUGH
- Postcode district: PE1
- Dialling code: 01733

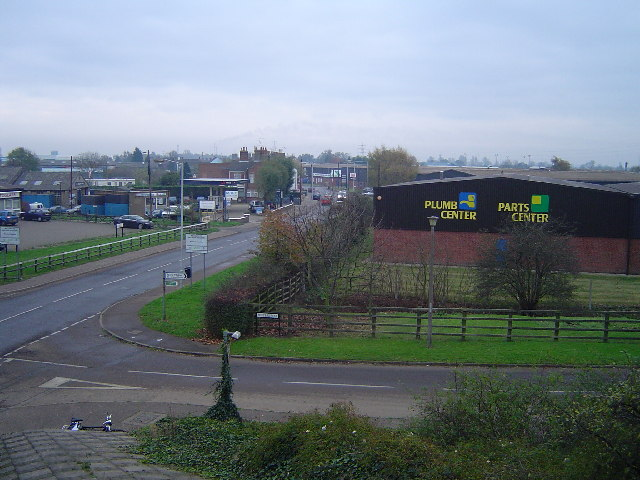
Fengate, Peterborough. From the Frank Perkins Parkway (A1139) looking east along Fengate, with Potters Way in the foreground going south to the river Nene.

Fengate is a predominantly industrial area of the city of Peterborough, in the Peterborough district, in the ceremonial county of Cambridgeshire, England. For electoral purposes it forms part of Peterborough East ward. The industrial estate is known as Eastern Industry. Peterborough Power Station is located here.

Flag Fen, the Bronze Age archaeological site, was discovered here in 1982 when a team led by Dr. Francis Pryor carried out a survey of dykes in the area. Probably religious, it comprises many poles arranged in five long rows, connecting Whittlesey with Peterborough across the wet fenland. This structure has been compared in rarity and importance to the Balbridie site in Aberdeenshire. The museum exhibits many of the artefacts found, including what is believed to be the oldest wheel in Britain. An exposed section of the Roman road known as the Fen Causeway also crosses the site.
