= Thomas Deacon Academy =

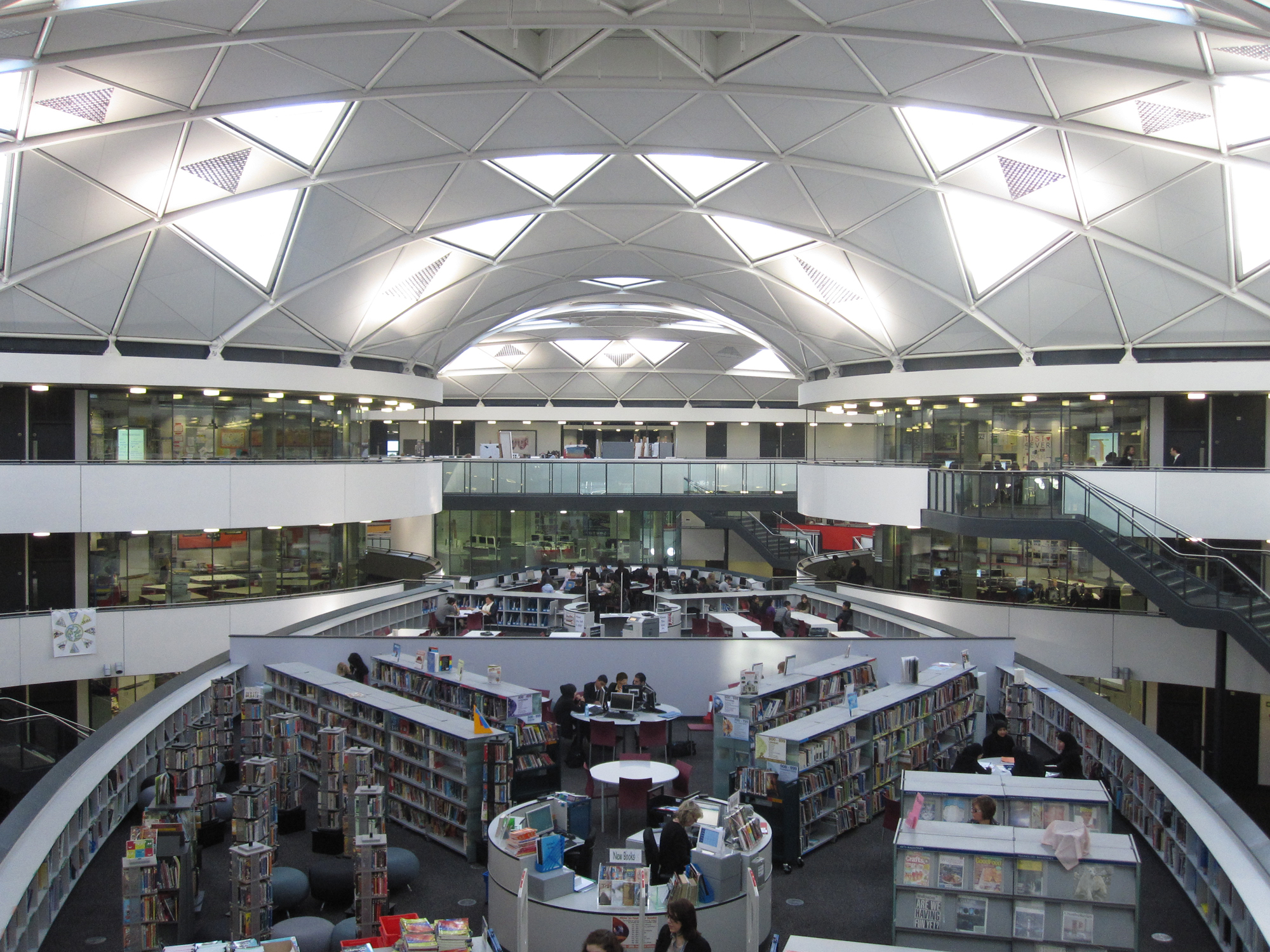

Location
- Queen's Gardens; Peterborough, Cambridgeshire, PE1 2UW; England; 52.5876°N 0.2341°W

Information
- Type: Academy
- Established: 2007
- Local authority: Peterborough City Council
- Trust: Thomas Deacon Education Trust
- Department for Education URN: 135263 Tables
- Ofsted: Reports
- Principal: Emily Gaunt
- Gender: Mixed
- Age: 7 to 19
- Enrolment: 2200
- Houses: Sandown, Milton, Highfield, Castle, Atherstone, Trinity
- Website: http://www.thomasdeaconacademy.com/

The Thomas Deacon Academy is a mixed gender academy complex in the north of Peterborough, Cambridgeshire, comprising the Thomas Deacon Academy Secondary School and sixth form and The Junior Academy for Key Stage 2 students.

== Thomas Deacon Academy ==
The Thomas Deacon Academy is an academy located in Peterborough, England. Built by contractors Laing O'Rourke to a design by Foster and Partners and Buro Happold, the academy's construction began in June 2005, and it opened to students in September 2007. The academy houses approximately 2,200 students ranging from ages 11–19 and was built on the site of Deacon's School in Queen's Gardens, Dogsthorpe. In the summer of 2016, it partnered with The Voyager Academy, eventually forming the Thomas Deacon Academy Education Trust.

The total cost of the Thomas Deacon Academy is estimated at £46.4 million. The Peterborough Evening Telegraph has reported that this had risen to £50 million. Contributors to the academy include Peterborough City Council, Perkins Engines and Deacon's School Trust, a charity created by the will of Thomas Deacon in 1721.

The teaching and student bodies combined the students and staff of three local schools: Deacon's School, John Mansfield School and Hereward Community College, all of which closed in July 2007. Thus allowing The academy to open in September of the same year. The academy initially offered the International Baccalaureate Diploma Programme to its sixth form students as an alternative to A-Levels, but abandoned it in 2009 due to the IB being not cost-effective for the small number of students who choose to do it.

An average day at the Academy starts at 8.45am and finishes at 3:15pm, but students may also attend after-school activities and additional lessons. The extra lessons can extend for a maximum of two hours after the end of the school day and are only scheduled for pupils in Key Stages 4 and 5. The school attracted controversy because it lacked a playground and no outside breaks were planned.

== Junior College ==
The Junior College opened in September 2014. Functioning as a junior school, it accepts students between the ages of 7 and 11, within four separate, age grouped, 'school years' in accordance with the standard within the U.K. system, currently Year 3, Year 4, Year 5 and Year 6, or the entirety of Key Stage 2. This cost of this new building is estimated to be around £7.2 million. The current head teacher of this school is Lucy Burks.
