= Saint Petersburg (disambiguation) =

Saint Petersburg is the second-largest city in Russia and was its capital in the 18th, 19th and early 20th centuries.

Saint Petersburg may also refer to:

== Places ==
- St. Petersburg, Florida, a city in Florida, United States
- St. Pete Beach, Florida, formerly St. Petersburg Beach
- Saint Petersburg, Colorado, an unincorporated community in Colorado, United States
- St. Petersburg, Pennsylvania, a borough in Pennsylvania, United States
- Petersburg, Alaska, sometimes referred to as St. Petersburg, a settlement in Alaska, United States
- Bourg-Saint-Pierre, Switzerland, also known by its German name St. Petersburg
- St. Petersburg, Missouri, the fictional hometown of Mark Twain's characters Tom Sawyer and Huckleberry Finn

== Ships ==
- MV City of St. Petersburg, a roll-on/roll-off, car carrier cargo ship
- SS St Petersburg, a former passenger ferry
- Sankt-Peterburg, a Russian icebreaker

== Arts ==
- St. Petersburg (tune), a tune by composer Dmitry Bortniansky (1751–1825)
- "St. Petersburg" (song), 2005 song by the band Supergrass
- Saint Petersburg (film), a 2010 film

== Other uses ==
- St. Petersburg paradox, in probability theory and decision theory
- St. Petersburg College, St. Petersburg, Florida, United States
- Saint Petersburg (board game), 2004 designer board game

== See also ==
- Petersburg (disambiguation)
- Convention of St Petersburg (disambiguation)
- Saint Petersburg Declaration (disambiguation)
- Treaty of Saint Petersburg (disambiguation)
- Petrograd (disambiguation)
- Leningrad (disambiguation)
