= Petersberg =

Petersberg may refer to:

- The Hotel Petersberg near Bonn, the site of the
  - Petersberg Agreement, 1949, regarding the international status of West Germany.
  - Petersberg tasks, 1992 and 1997, regarding European security cooperation. Also known as "Petersburg Missions" or "Petersberg Objectives".
  - Petersberg Declaration
- Municipalities in Germany:
  - Petersberg, Hesse, in the district of Fulda, Hesse
  - Petersberg, Rhineland-Palatinate, in the district Südwestpfalz, Rhineland-Palatinate
  - Götschetal-Petersberg, collective municipality in the district Saalekreis, Saxony-Anhalt
    - Petersberg, Saxony-Anhalt, in Götschetal-Petersberg
  - Petersberg, Thuringia, in the district Saale-Holzland, Thuringia
- German name of Sânpetru, Brașov, Romania
- Petersberg, Italy, a frazione in Deutschnofen, Trentino-Alto Adige / Südtirol, Italy
- Hills and mountains in Germany:
  - Petersberg in Götschetal-Petersberg
  - Petersberg in Erfurt, site of the Petersberg Citadel
  - Petersberg (Flintsbach) or The Madron, Flintsbach, Bavaria, site of St. Peter's Abbey on the Madron
  - Petersberg, Halle, a hill near Halle, Saxony-Anhalt
- Heisterbach Abbey, also Petersthal, formerly Petersberg, near Oberdollendorf, after which the Hotel Petersberg is named

== See also ==
- Peterborough (disambiguation)
- Petersburg (disambiguation)
- Saint Petersburg (disambiguation)
- Peters (disambiguation)
- Peter (disambiguation)
