= Petersburg =

Petersburg, or Petersburgh, may refer to:

== Places ==
=== Australia ===
- Petersburg, former name of Peterborough, South Australia

=== Canada ===
- Petersburg, Ontario

=== Russia ===
- Saint Petersburg, sometimes referred to as Petersburg

=== United States ===
- Peterborg, U.S. Virgin Islands
- Petersburg, Alaska
- Petersburg, California
- Petersburg, California, former name of Greasertown, California
- Petersburg, Delaware
- Petersburg, Georgia
- Petersburg, Illinois
- Petersburg, Indiana
- Petersburg, Iowa (disambiguation)
- Petersburg, Kentucky (disambiguation)
- Petersburg, Boone County, Kentucky
- Petersburg, Jefferson County, Kentucky
- Petersburg, Michigan
- Petersburg Township, Jackson County, Minnesota
- Petersburg, Minnesota
- Petersburg, Missouri
- Petersburg, Missouri, former name of Bigelow, Missouri
- Petersburg, Nebraska
- Petersburg, Cape May County, New Jersey
- Petersburg, Morris County, New Jersey
- Petersburgh, New York
- Petersburg, North Carolina (disambiguation)
- Petersburg, North Dakota
- Petersburg, Ohio (disambiguation)
- Petersburg, Pennsylvania
- Petersburg, Tennessee
- Petersburg, Texas
- Petersburg, Virginia
- Petersburg, West Virginia
- Petersburg, Wisconsin

== Other uses ==
- Petersburg (novel), a 1913 novel by Andrei Bely
- Siege of Petersburg, a battle of the American Civil War
- SS Petersburg, an oil tanker

== See also ==
- Battle of Petersburg (disambiguation)
- Saint Petersburg (disambiguation)
- Petersberg (disambiguation)
- Peterborough (disambiguation)
- Petrograd (disambiguation)
- Peters (disambiguation)
- Peter (disambiguation)
- Pietersburg, former name of Polokwane
