= Petersburg, New Jersey =

Petersburg, New Jersey may refer to:

- Petersburg, Cape May County, New Jersey
- Petersburg, Morris County, New Jersey

== See also ==
- Petersburg (disambiguation)
