= M2 Browning =

.50-caliber heavy machine gun

Browning machine gun, cal. .50, M2, HB
- M2E2 with a quick change barrel and tripod
- Type: Heavy machine gun
- Place of origin: United States

Service history
- In service: 1933–present
- Used by: See Users
- Wars: World War II; 1947-1949 Palestine war Indonesian National Revolution; Korean War; First Indochina War; Suez Crisis; 1958 Lebanon crisis Cuban Revolution; Portuguese Colonial War; Rhodesian Bush War; Vietnam War; Laotian Civil War; Cambodian Civil War; Colombian conflict Dominican Civil War; Ethiopian Civil War; Lebanese Civil War; Cambodian–Vietnamese War; Sino-Vietnamese War; Nicaraguan Revolution; Falklands War; Operation Urgent Fury; Kurdish–Turkish conflict (1978–2025); Iran–Iraq War; Operation Just Cause; Persian Gulf War; Rwandan Civil War; Somali Civil War; Yugoslav Wars; Operation Uphold Democracy; War in Afghanistan (2001–2021); Iraq War; Mexican drug war Syrian Civil War (2011–present); War in Iraq (2013–2017); Yemeni Civil War (2014–present); Russo-Ukrainian War

Production history
- Designer: John Browning
- Designed: 1918
- Manufacturer: Active; Fabrique Nationale; General Dynamics; Ohio Ordnance Works Inc.; U.S. Ordnance; Former; Manroy Engineering; Sabre Defence Industries; Colt's Patent Firearms Manufacturing Company; High Standard Firearms; Savage Arms Corporation; Buffalo Arms Corporation; General Motors Corporation; Frigidaire; AC Spark Plug; Saginaw Steering Gear Division; Brown-Lipe-Chappin Divisions; Kelsey Hayes Wheel Company; Springfield Armory; Wayne Pump Company; ERMCO; Ramo Manufacturing; Rock Island Arsenal
- Produced: 1921–present (M2HB/M2A1)
- No. built: 3 million

Specifications
- Mass: 38 kg (84 lb) 28 kg (62 lb) (AN/M2); 58 kg (128 lb) with tripod and traverse and elevation mechanism (T&E); 24 lb (11 kg) barrel weight
- Length: 1,654 mm (65.1 in); 1,429 mm (56.3 in) (AN/M2)
- Barrel length: 1,143 mm (45.0 in); 910 mm (35.8 in) (AN/M2)
- Cartridge: .50 BMG (12.7×99mm NATO)
- Action: Short recoil-operated
- Rate of fire: 450–600 rounds/min (M2HB); 750–850 rounds/min (AN/M2); 1,200–1,300 rounds/min (AN/M3)
- Muzzle velocity: 2,910 ft/s (890 m/s) (M33 ball), 78 ft (24 m) from muzzle 3,050 ft/s (930 m/s) in manual
- Effective firing range: 1,800 m (2,000 yd)
- Maximum firing range: 7,400 m (8,100 yd)
- Feed system: Belt-fed (M2 or M9 links)

The M2 machine gun or Browning .50-caliber machine gun (informally, "Ma Deuce") is a heavy machine gun that was designed near the end of World War I by John Browning. While similar to Browning's M1919 Browning machine gun, which was chambered for the .30-06 cartridge, the M2 uses Browning's larger and more powerful .50 BMG (12.7 mm) cartridge. The design has had many designations; the official U.S. military designation for the infantry type is Browning Machine Gun, Cal. .50, M2, HB, Flexible. It has been used against infantry, light armored vehicles, watercraft, light fortifications, and low-flying aircraft.

The gun has been used extensively as a vehicle weapon and for aircraft armament by the United States since the 1930s. It was heavily used during World War II, the Korean War, the Vietnam War, the Gulf War, the War in Afghanistan, and the Iraq War. It is the primary heavy machine gun of NATO countries and has been used by many other countries as well. U.S. forces have used the M2 longer than any other firearm except the .45 ACP M1911 pistol, which was also designed by John Browning.

The M2HB (heavy barrel) is manufactured in the U.S. by General Dynamics, Ohio Ordnance Works, U.S. Ordnance, and FN Herstal for sale to the U.S. government and other nations via Foreign Military Sales.

== History ==
Machine guns were heavily used in World War I, and weapons of larger-than-rifle caliber began appearing on both sides of the conflict. The larger rounds were needed to pierce the armor that was being introduced to the battlefield, both on the ground and in the air. Germany introduced the Junkers J.I aircraft, whose armor could render ineffective aircraft machine guns that used conventional rifle ammunition such as the .30-06. Consequently, the American Expeditionary Force's commander General John J. Pershing asked for a larger-caliber machine gun. Pershing asked the Army Ordnance Department to develop a machine gun with a caliber of at least 0.50 inches (12.7 mm) and a muzzle velocity of at least 2,700 feet per second (820 m/s).

Around July 1917, John Browning began redesigning his .30-06 M1917 machine gun to use a larger and more powerful round. Winchester worked on the cartridge, which was a scaled-up version of the .30-06. Winchester initially added a rim to the cartridge because the company intended to use the cartridge in an anti-tank rifle, but Pershing insisted the cartridge be rimless. The first .50-caliber machine gun underwent trials on 15 October 1918. It fired at less than 500 rounds per minute, and the muzzle velocity was only 2,300 ft/s (700 m/s). Cartridge improvements were promised. The gun was heavy, difficult to control, fired too slowly for the anti-personnel role, and lacked sufficient power for the anti-armor role.

While the .50-caliber was being developed, some 13.2×92mmSR Mauser 1918 T-Gewehr anti-tank rifles and their ammunition were captured. The 13.2 mm German rounds had a muzzle velocity of 2,700 ft/s (820 m/s), an 800 gr (52 g) bullet, and could penetrate armor 1 in (25 mm) thick at a range of 250 yd (230 m). Winchester improved the .50 caliber round to have similar performance. Ultimately, the muzzle velocity was 2,750 ft/s (840 m/s).

Efforts by Browning and Fred T. Moore resulted in the water-cooled, .50-caliber M1921 Browning machine gun and an aircraft version. These guns were used experimentally from 1921 until 1937. They had lightweight barrels and the ammunition fed only from the left side. Service trials raised doubts about whether the guns would be suitable for aircraft or for anti-aircraft use. A heavy-barrel M1921 was considered for ground vehicles.

John M. Browning died in 1926. Between 1927 and 1932, S. H. Green studied the design problems of the M1921 and the needs of the armed services. The result was a single receiver design that could be turned into seven types of .50-caliber machine guns by using different jackets, barrels, and other components. The new receiver allowed right or left side feed. In 1933, Colt manufactured several prototype Browning machine guns (including what would be known as the M1921A1 and M1921E2). With support from the Navy, Colt started manufacturing the M2 in 1933. FN Herstal (French: Fabrique Nationale) has manufactured the M2 machine gun since the 1930s. General Dynamics, U.S. Ordnance and Ohio Ordnance Works Inc. are other current manufacturers.

A variant without a water jacket, but with a thicker-walled, air-cooled barrel was designated the M2 HB (HB for Heavy Barrel). The added mass and surface area of the heavy barrel compensated somewhat for the loss of water-cooling, while reducing bulk and weight: the M2 weighs 121 lb (55 kg) with a water jacket, but the M2 HB weighs 84 lb (38 kg). Due to the long procedure for changing the barrel, an improved system was developed by FN Herstal called QCB (quick change barrel). The lightweight "Army/Navy" prefixed AN/M2 "light-barrel" version of the Browning M2 weighing 60 pounds (27 kg) was also developed, and became the standard .50-caliber aviation machine gun of the World War II–era for American military aircraft of nearly every type, readily replacing Browning's own air-cooled .30 caliber machine gun design in nearly all American aircraft installations.

== Design details ==
The Browning M2 is an air-cooled, belt-fed machine gun, essentially a scaled-up version of John Browning's M1917 .30 caliber machine gun. The M2 fires from a closed bolt, operated on the short recoil principle. The M2 fires the .50 BMG cartridge, which offers long range, high accuracy, and immense stopping power. The closed bolt firing cycle made the M2 usable as a synchronized machine gun on aircraft before and during World War II, as on the early versions of the Curtiss P-40 fighter.

=== Features ===
The M2 has varying cyclic rates of fire, depending on the model. The M2HB air-cooled ground gun has a cyclical rate of 450–575 rounds per minute. The early M2 water-cooled AA guns had a cyclical rate of around 450–600 rpm. The AN/M2 aircraft gun has a cyclic rate of 750–850 rpm; this increases to 1,200 rpm for AN/M3 aircraft guns. These maximum rates of fire are generally not achieved in use, as sustained fire at that rate will wear out the bore within a few thousand rounds, necessitating replacement. In addition to full automatic, the M2HB can be selected to fire single shots, fire slowly at less than 40 rounds per minute, or fire rapidly for more than 40 rounds per minute. Slow and rapid firing modes use 5–7 round bursts with different lengths of pause between bursts.

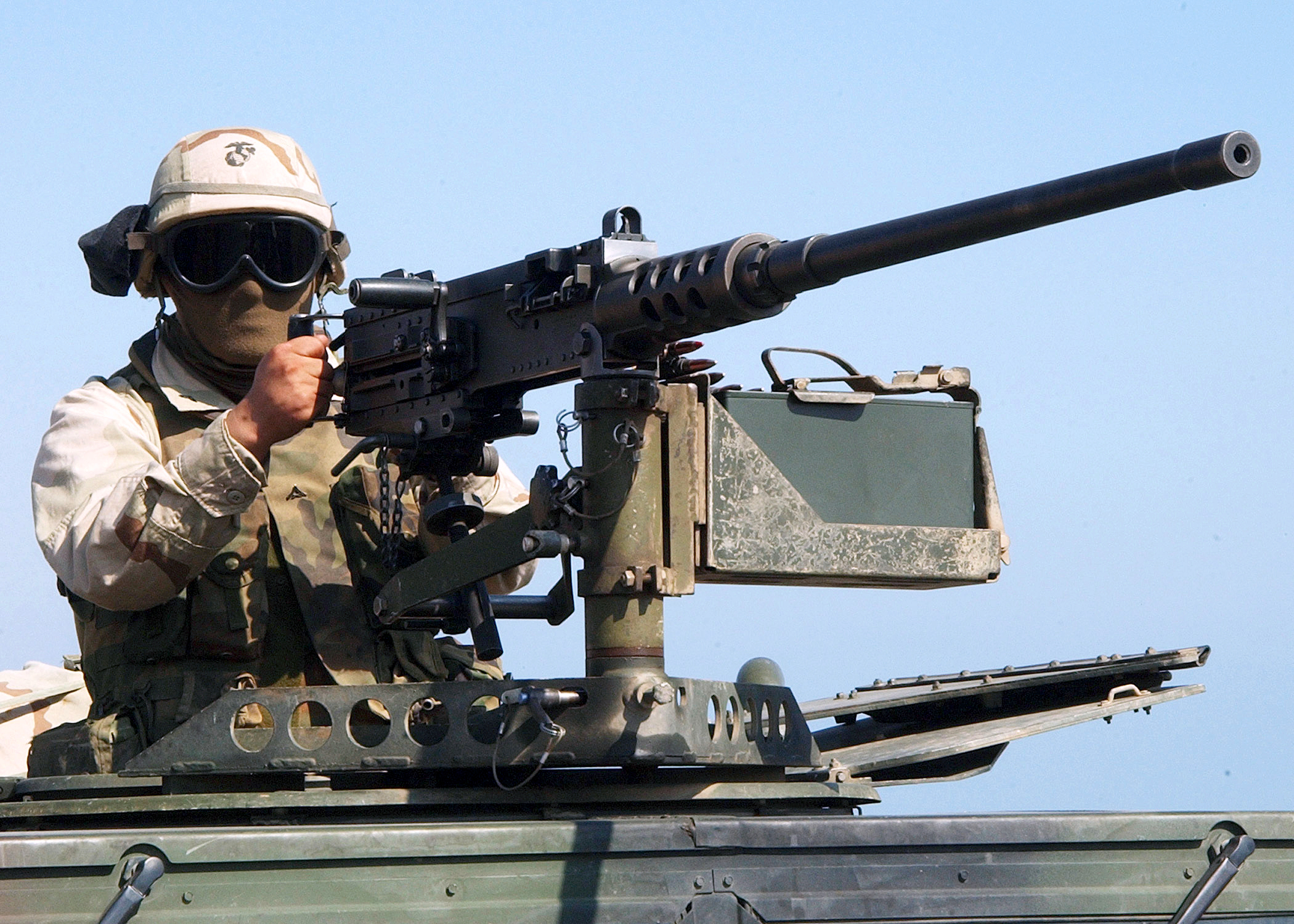
A U.S. Marine mans a .50-caliber machine gun as part of a security force during a training exercise with the 24th Marine Expeditionary Unit in November 2002.

The M2 has an effective range of 1,830 metres (2,000 yd) and a maximum effective range of 2,000 metres (2,200 yd) when fired from the M3 tripod. In its ground-portable, crew-served role as the M2HB, the gun itself weighs 84 pounds (38 kg) and the assembled M3 tripod another 44 pounds (20 kg). In this configuration, the V-shaped "butterfly" trigger is located at the very rear of the weapon with a "spade handle" handgrip on either side of it and the bolt release in the center. The spade handles are gripped and the butterfly trigger is depressed with one or both thumbs. Recently, new rear buffer assemblies have used squeeze triggers mounted to the handgrips, doing away with the butterfly triggers.

When the bolt release is locked down by the bolt latch release lock on the buffer tube sleeve, the gun functions in fully automatic mode. Conversely, the bolt release can be unlocked into the up position resulting in single-shot firing (the gunner must press the bolt latch release to send the bolt forward). Unlike virtually all other modern machine guns, it has no safety (although a sliding safety switch has recently been fielded to USMC armorers for installation on their weapons and is standard issue for the U.S. Army for all M2s). Troops in the field have been known to add an improvised safety measure against accidental firing by slipping an expended shell casing under the butterfly trigger. The upgraded M2A1 has a manual trigger block safety.

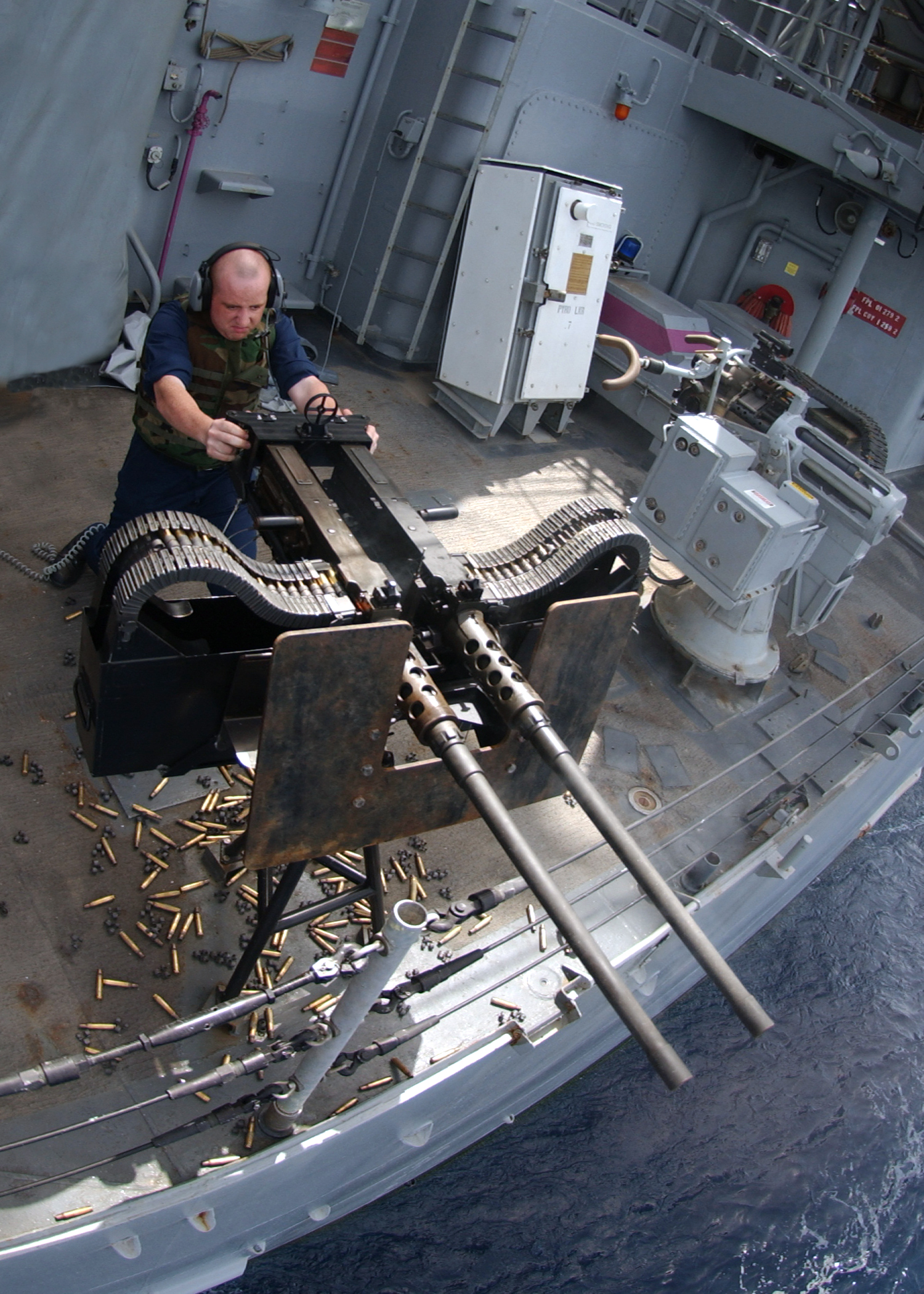
Twin M2HB machine gun during a pre-action calibration fire (PACFIRE) exercise in May 2005

The M2 was designed to operate in many configurations; it can be adapted to feed from the left or right side of the weapon by exchanging the belt-holding pawls and the front and rear cartridge stops (three-piece set to include link stripper), then reversing the bolt switch. The operator must also convert the top-cover belt feed slide assembly from left- to right-hand feed as well as the spring and plunger in the feed arm. A skilled operator can perform this conversion in under two minutes.

The charging assembly can also be swapped from left-hand to right-hand charge, though a right-hand charging handle spring is required. The M2 can be more easily interchanged if it is preemptively fitted with a retracting slide assembly on both sides of the weapon system.

At some point during World War II, the Frankford Arsenal developed a squeeze bore version of the M2HB which reduced the bullet size from .50 to .30 caliber.

=== Ammunition ===
There are several different types of ammunition used in the M2HB and AN aircraft guns. From World War II through the Vietnam War, the Browning was used with standard ball, armor-piercing (AP), armor-piercing incendiary (API), and armor-piercing incendiary tracer (APIT) rounds. All .50 ammunition designated "armor-piercing" was required to completely perforate 0.875 inches (22.2 mm) of hardened steel armor plate at a distance of 100 yards (91 m) and 0.75 inches (19 mm) at 547 yards (500 m). The API and APIT rounds left a flash, report, and smoke on contact, useful in detecting strikes on enemy targets; they were primarily intended to incapacitate thin-skinned and lightly armored vehicles and aircraft, while igniting their fuel tanks.

Current ammunition types include M33 Ball (706.7 grain) for personnel and light material targets, M17 tracer, M8 API (622.5 grain), M20 API-T (619 grain), and M962 SLAP-T. The latter ammunition along with the M903 SLAP (Saboted Light Armor Penetrator) round can perforate 1.34 inches (34 mm) of FHA (face-hardened steel plate) at 500 metres (550 yd), 0.91 inches (23 mm) at 1,200 metres (1,300 yd), and 0.75 inches (19 mm) at 1,500 metres (1,600 yd). This is achieved by using a 0.30-inch-diameter (7.6 mm) tungsten penetrator. The SLAP-T adds a tracer charge to the base of the ammunition. This ammunition was type classified in 1993.

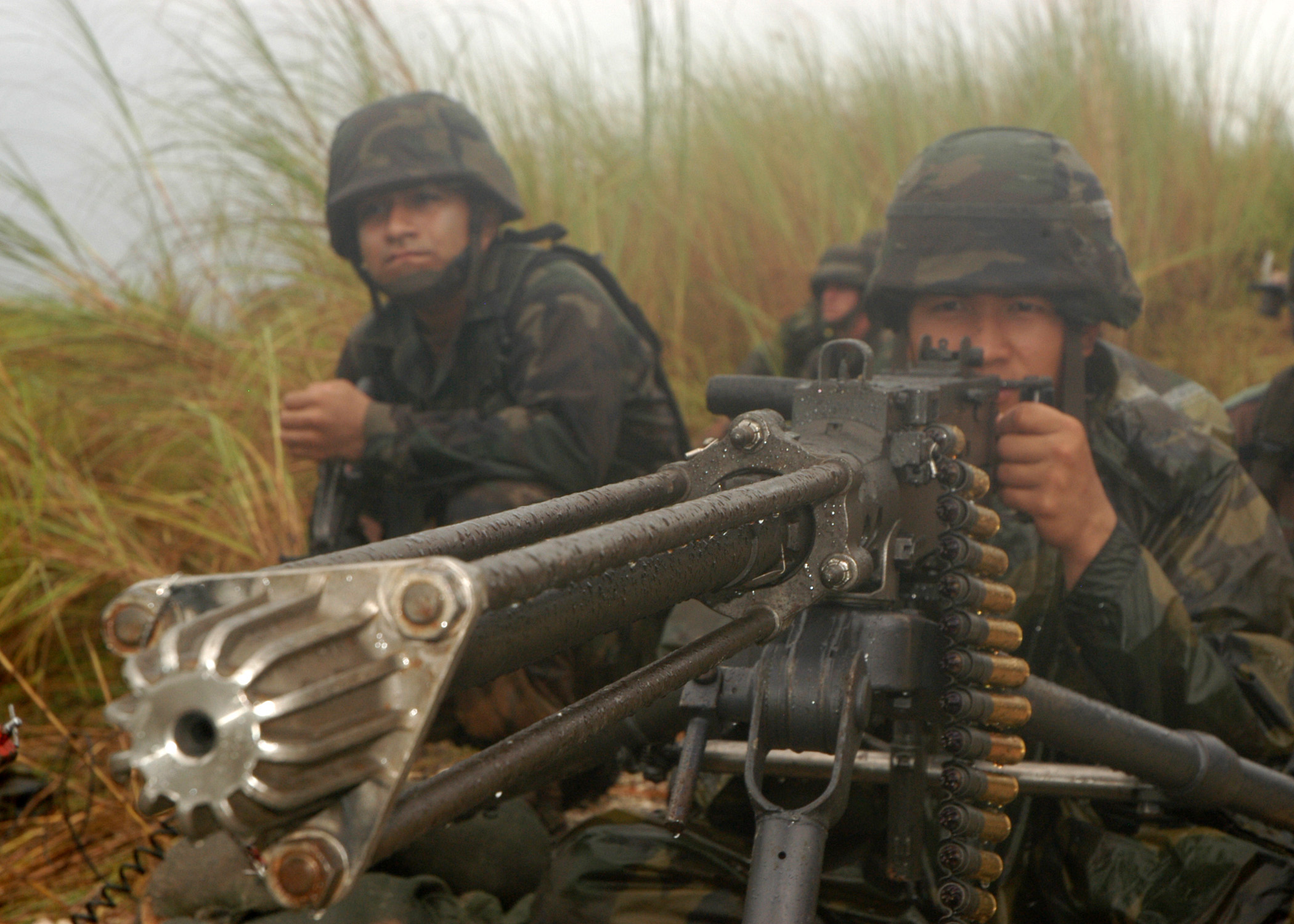
M2 with blank-firing adapter

When firing blanks, a large blank-firing adapter (BFA) of a special type must be used to allow the recoil-operated action to cycle. This functions on the principle of a recoil booster, to increase the recoil force acting on the short recoil action. This is the exact antithesis of a muzzle brake. Without this adaptor, the reduced-charge blank cartridge would develop too little recoil to cycle the action fully. The adapter is very distinctive, attaching to the muzzle with three rods extending back to the base. The BFA can often be seen on M2s during peacetime operations.

== Deployment ==
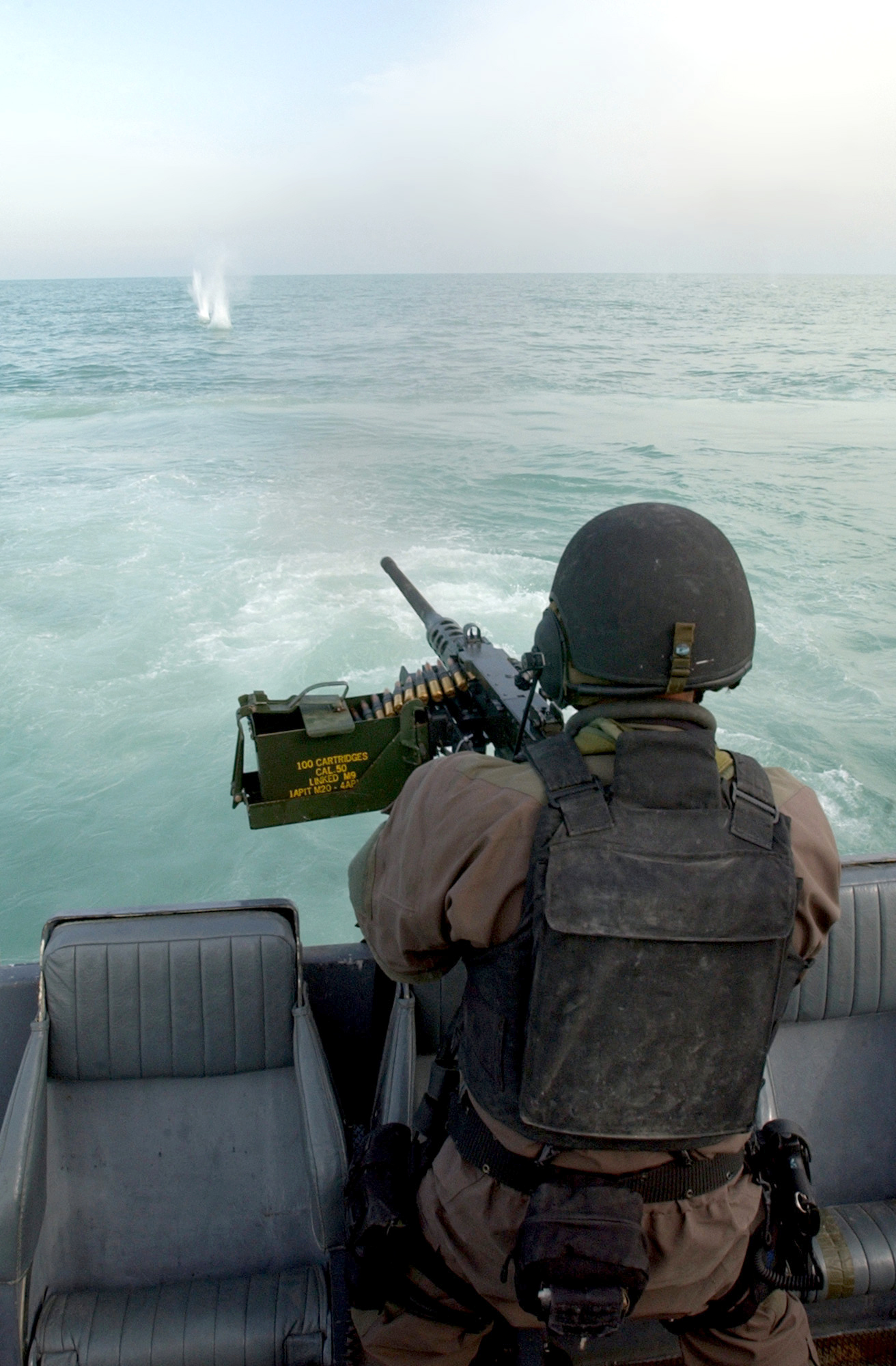
An M2 fired from a rigid-hulled inflatable boat.

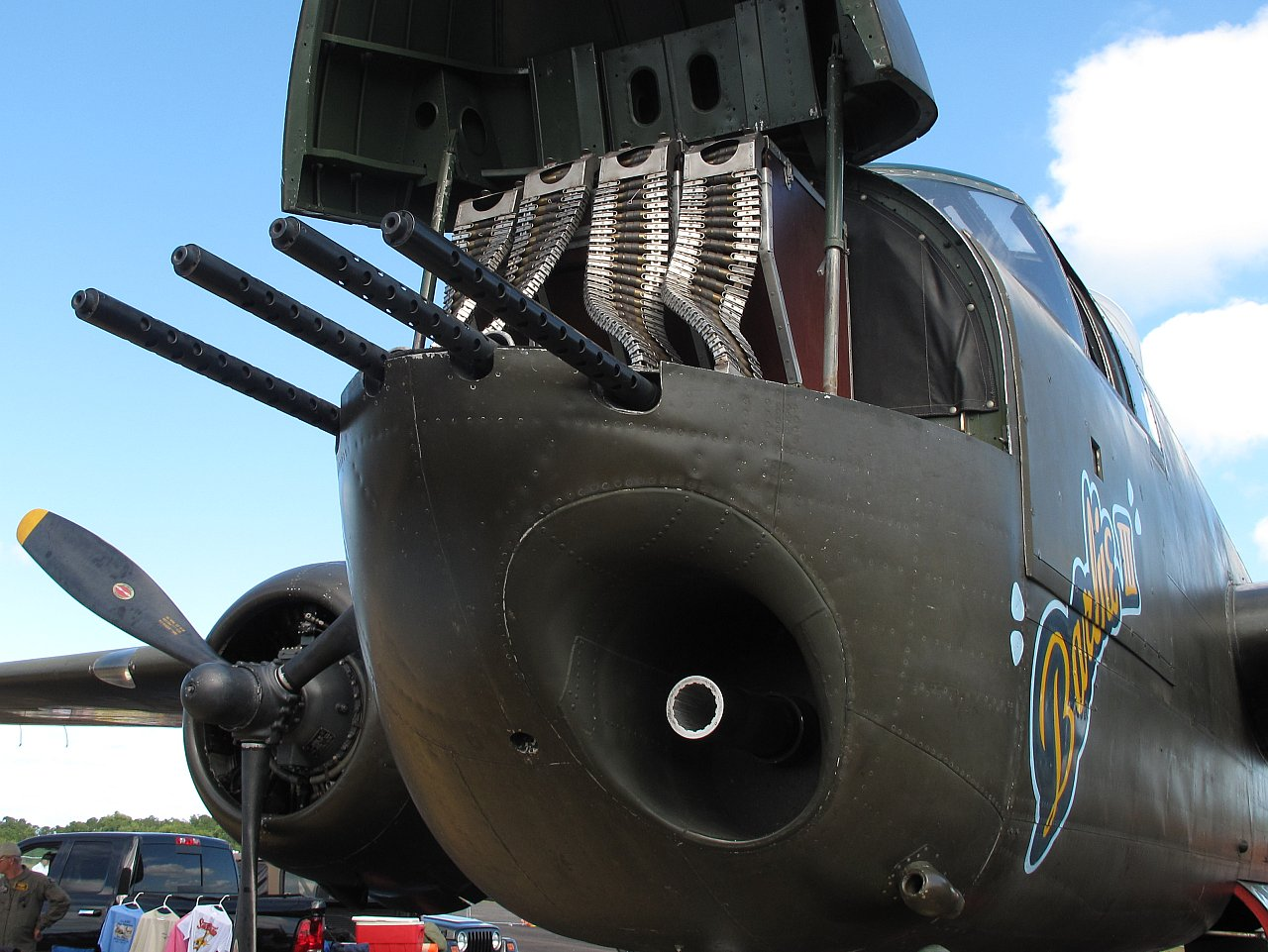
B-25H "Barbie III" showing four M2 feeds and 75 mm M5 gun

The M2 .50 Browning machine gun has been used for various roles:

- A medium infantry support weapon
- As a light anti-aircraft (AA) gun in some ships; up to six M2 guns could be mounted on the same turret.
- As an anti-aircraft gun on the ground. The original water-cooled version of the M2 was used on a tall AA tripod or vehicle-mounted anti-aircraft weapon on pedestal mount. In later variants, twin and quadruple M2HB Brownings were used, such as the M45 Quadmount (aka "meat chopper") used on the U.S. M16 half-track carrier. Twin or quad-mount .50 M2 guns normally used alternating left-hand and right-hand feed.
- Primary or secondary weapon on an armored fighting vehicle.
- Primary or secondary weapon on a naval patrol boat.
- Spotting for the primary weapon on some armored fighting vehicles.
- Secondary weapon for anti-boat defense on large naval vessels (corvettes, frigates, destroyers, cruisers, etc.).
- Coaxial gun or independent mounting in some tanks, including but not limited to: the M47 Patton, M48 Patton, M4 Sherman, M24 Chaffee, Heavy tank M6, Heavy Tank T29, M1 Abrams, M60 Patton, M46 Patton, and the M26 Pershing.
- Fixed-mounted forward-firing primary aircraft armament (AN/M2 and AN/M3 light-barrel versions only). The AN/M2 was used as primary armament in almost all World War II U.S. pursuit aircraft (such as the North American P-51 Mustang, Republic P-47 Thunderbolt, Lockheed P-38 Lightning, Bell P-39 Airacobra, Curtiss P-40 Warhawk, Grumman F6F Hellcat, and Vought F4U Corsair). It was also used in fixed mountings in bombers and ground attack aircraft like the Douglas SBD Dauntless dive bomber, Grumman TBF Avenger torpedo bomber, and medium bombers such as North American B-25 Mitchell, Martin B-26 Marauder, and Douglas A-26 Invader; usually 4–8 per aircraft but the bombers could mount 12 or more in certain configurations. The later, faster-firing electrically feed-boosted AN/M3 was used in many Korean War–era USAF fighter aircraft such as the Lockheed F-80 Shooting Star, Republic F-84 Thunderjet, North American F-86 Sabre, and early versions of the Martin B-57 Canberra bomber. The U.S. Navy had largely completed their move to the (unrelated) M2/AN 20 mm autocannon for aircraft armament by this time.
- Turret-mount or flexible-mounted defensive armament, again only with the AN/M2 light-barrel version, in almost all U.S. World War II–era bombers and patrol aircraft such as the Boeing B-17 Flying Fortress, Consolidated B-24 Liberator and Boeing B-29 Superfortress heavy bombers, North American B-25 Mitchell and Martin B-26 Marauder medium bombers, Consolidated PBY Catalina patrol flying boats, Goodyear K- and M-class blimps, Grumman TBF/TBM Avenger torpedo bombers, and in a combined offensive/defensive turret mounting in many Northrop P-61 Black Widow night fighters. The AN/M3 was used as a flexible, quad-mounted, radar-directed tail-defense gun as late as 1980 on the Boeing B-52 Stratofortress, until replaced by 20 mm M61 Vulcan Gatling-type cannon on the H model.
- Variants of the AN/M3 are used as flexible door guns or as flexible remotely controlled armament subsystems on many U.S. Army, Navy, Marine Corps and Coast Guard helicopters, such as the Bell UH-1 Iroquois, Sikorsky UH-60 Blackhawk and variants, Sikorsky CH-53E Super Stallion, Bell OH-58 Kiowa, and others.

=== United States ===
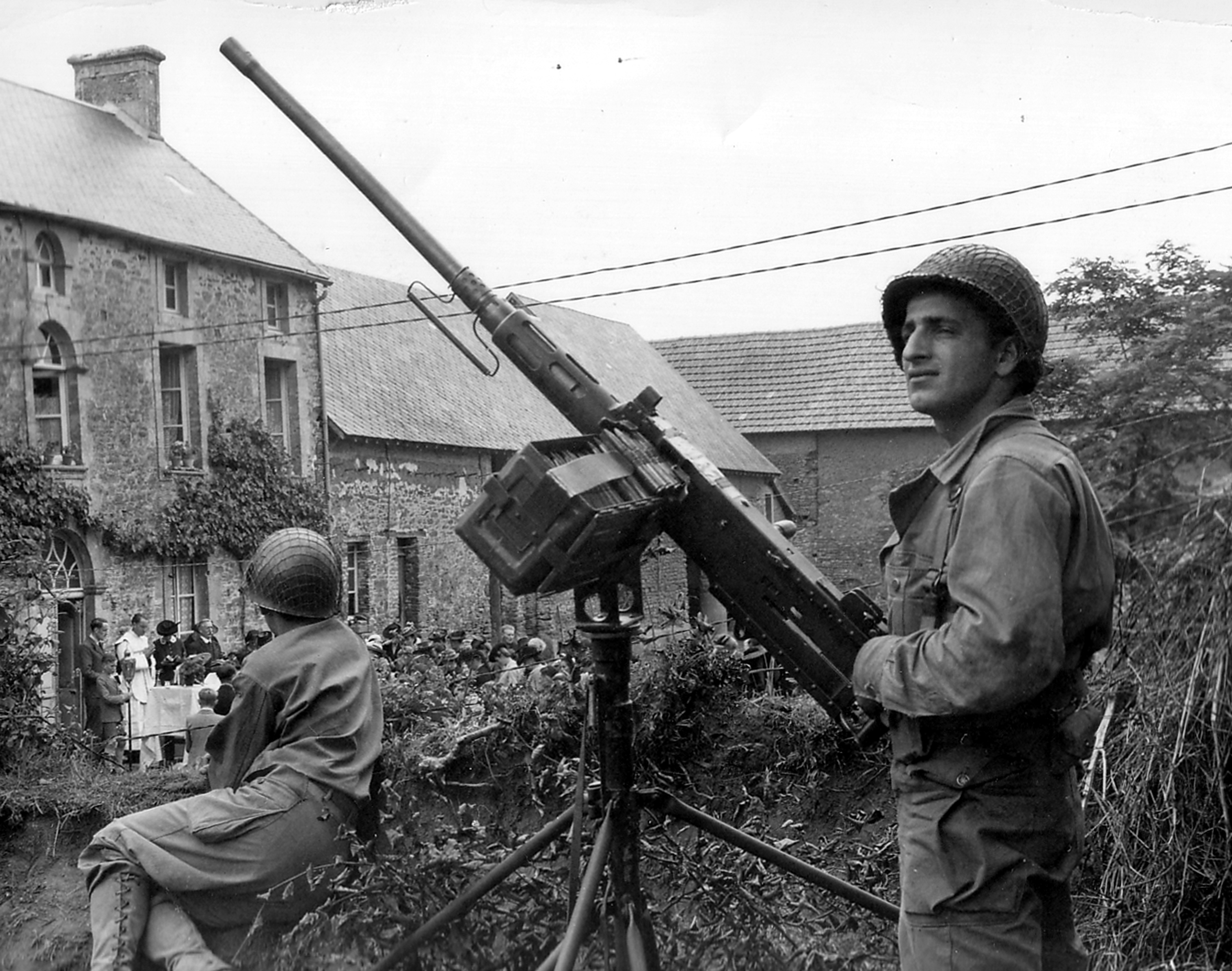
A U.S. soldier in Normandy stands guard with the M2HB installed on a dual-purpose mounting, 1944.

At the outbreak of the Second World War, the United States had versions of the M2 in service as fixed aircraft guns, anti-aircraft defensive guns (on aircraft, ships, or boats), infantry (tripod-mounted) guns, and as dual purpose anti-aircraft and anti-vehicular weapons on vehicles.

The .50 AN/M2 light-barrel aircraft Browning used in planes had a rate of fire of approximately 800 rounds per minute and was used singly or in groups of up to eight guns for aircraft ranging from the Republic P-47 Thunderbolt to the North American B-25 Mitchell bomber, which in the last J-version of the Mitchell could have up to 14 M2s firing forward for ground attack missions – eight in a solid metal-structure nose, four more mounted in a pair of conformal twin-gunned gun pods on the lower cockpit sides, and two more if the forward dorsal turret's pair of M2 guns were also aimed straight forward. The later A-26 bested this with up to a maximum of 16/18 machine guns, 8 in the nose, four more per wing in flush-mount pods, plus 2 guns in the dorsal turret.

In the dual-purpose vehicle mount, the M2HB proved extremely effective in U.S. service: the Browning's .50-caliber AP and API rounds could easily penetrate the engine block or fuel tanks of a German Bf 109 fighter attacking at low altitude, or perforate the hull plates and fuel tanks of a German half-track or light armored car. It could even penetrate the sides and rear of the Panzer I, Panzer II, Panzer III, and Panzer IV tanks. While the dual-purpose mounting was undeniably useful, it did normally require the operator to stand when using the M2 in a ground role, exposing him to return fire. Units in the field often modified the mountings on their vehicles, especially tanks and tank destroyers, to provide more operator protection in the anti-vehicular and anti-personnel role. The weapon was particularly hated by the Germans, whose attacks and ambushes against otherwise helpless stalled motor convoys were frequently broken up by .50-caliber machine gun fire. Vehicles would frequently perform "recon by fire" with the M2 Browning; i.e., they would fire continuously at suspected points of ambush while moving through areas still containing enemy forces.

Heavy weapons companies in some Army infantry battalions and regiments were issued a single M2 Browning with tripod (ground) mount. The M2HB proved particularly useful as a defensive weapon against German infantry and motorized forces. It could be mounted on a tripod and secured in place with sandbags, denying the enemy access to intersections and other choke points. Hearing the sound of an M2 was often enough to convince enemy infantry to take cover. There are numerous recorded instances of the M2 Browning being used against enemy personnel, particularly in infantry assaults or to suppress and eliminate artillery observers and snipers at long range.

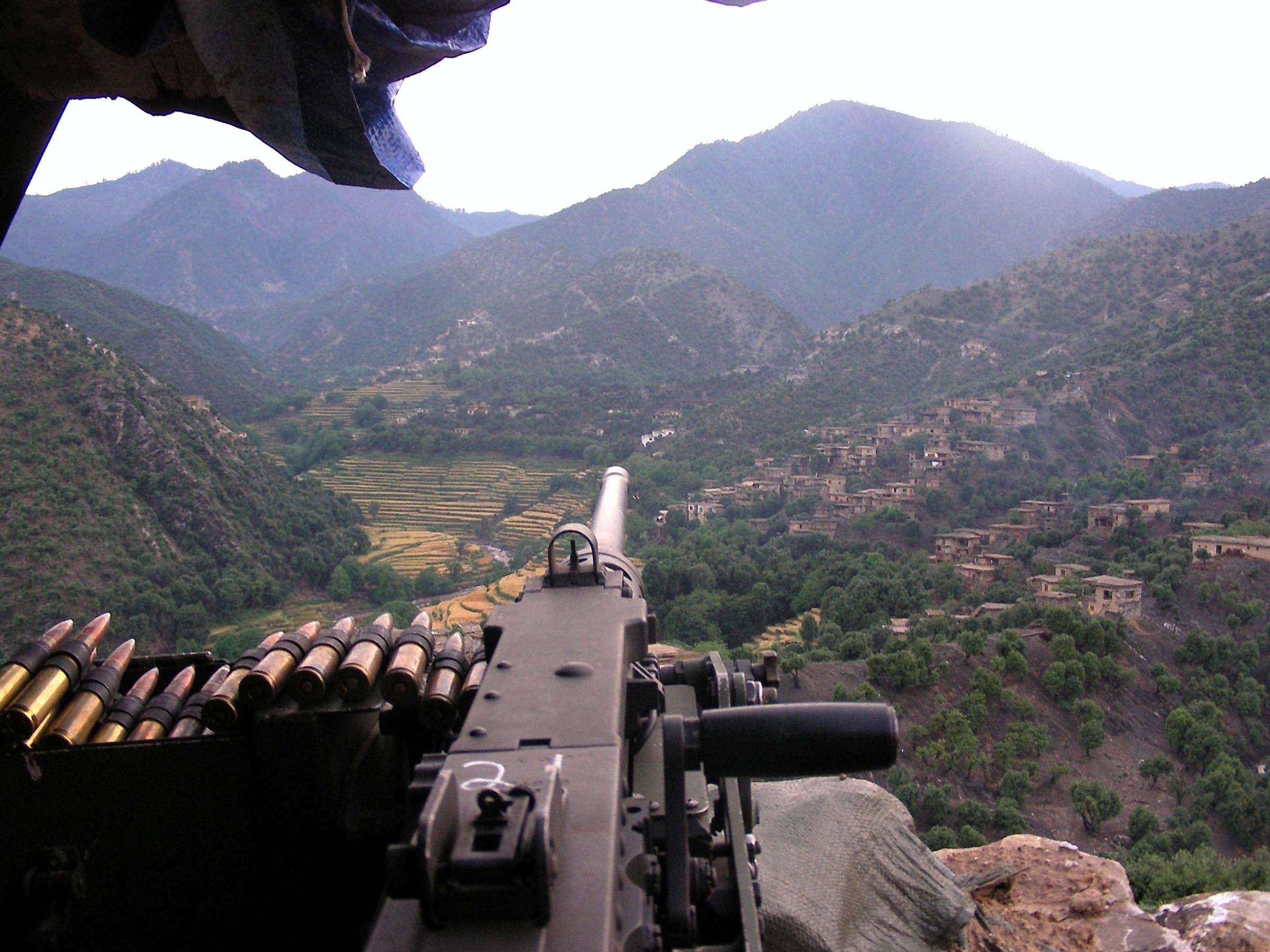
An M2 overlooking the Korengal Valley at Firebase Phoenix, Afghanistan, in 2007

The M2HB was not widely used in the Pacific campaign for several reasons, including the weight of the gun, the nature of infantry jungle combat, and because road intersections were usually easily outflanked. However, it was used by fast-moving motorized forces in the Philippines to destroy Japanese blocking units on the advance to Manila. The quad mount .50 was also used to destroy Japanese emplacements.

The M2HB was used in Korea and Vietnam, and later in both Operation Desert Storm, the Afghan theater of Operation Enduring Freedom and in Iraq. In 2003, U.S. Army SFC Paul Ray Smith used his M2HB mounted on an M113 armored personnel carrier to kill 20 to 50 enemies who were attacking a U.S. outpost, preventing an aid station from being overrun and allowing wounded soldiers to be evacuated, SFC Smith was killed during the firefight and was posthumously awarded the Medal of Honor.

==== M45 Quadmount ====
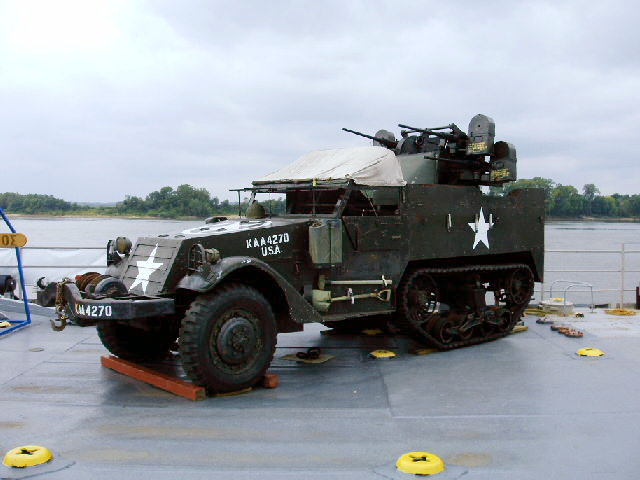
An M45 Quadmount installed on an M16 Multiple Gun Motor Carriage

The M45 Quadmount was a mounting of four .50 M2HB guns with a single gunner situated behind an armored housing. This was used by U.S. anti-air battalions, fitted either on a towed trailer or mounted on a half-track carrier. With 200 rounds per gun in a powered tracking mount, the guns proved very effective against low-flying aircraft. The use of four guns adequately compensated for the fact that the individual M2HB's rate of fire (450–550 rounds per minute) was low for an effective anti-aircraft weapon.

Towards the end of the war, as Luftwaffe attacks became less frequent, the quad .50 (nicknamed the Meat Chopper or Krautmower) was increasingly used in an anti-personnel role, similarly to the earlier-introduced (1940) and more powerful—but much more difficult to keep well-fed with ammunition when in action—German 20 mm Flakvierling. Snipers firing from trees were engaged by the quad gunner at trunk level; the weapon would cut down and destroy the entire tree, and the sniper with it.

The M45 Quadmount was still in use during the Vietnam War.

=== Commonwealth and other forces ===
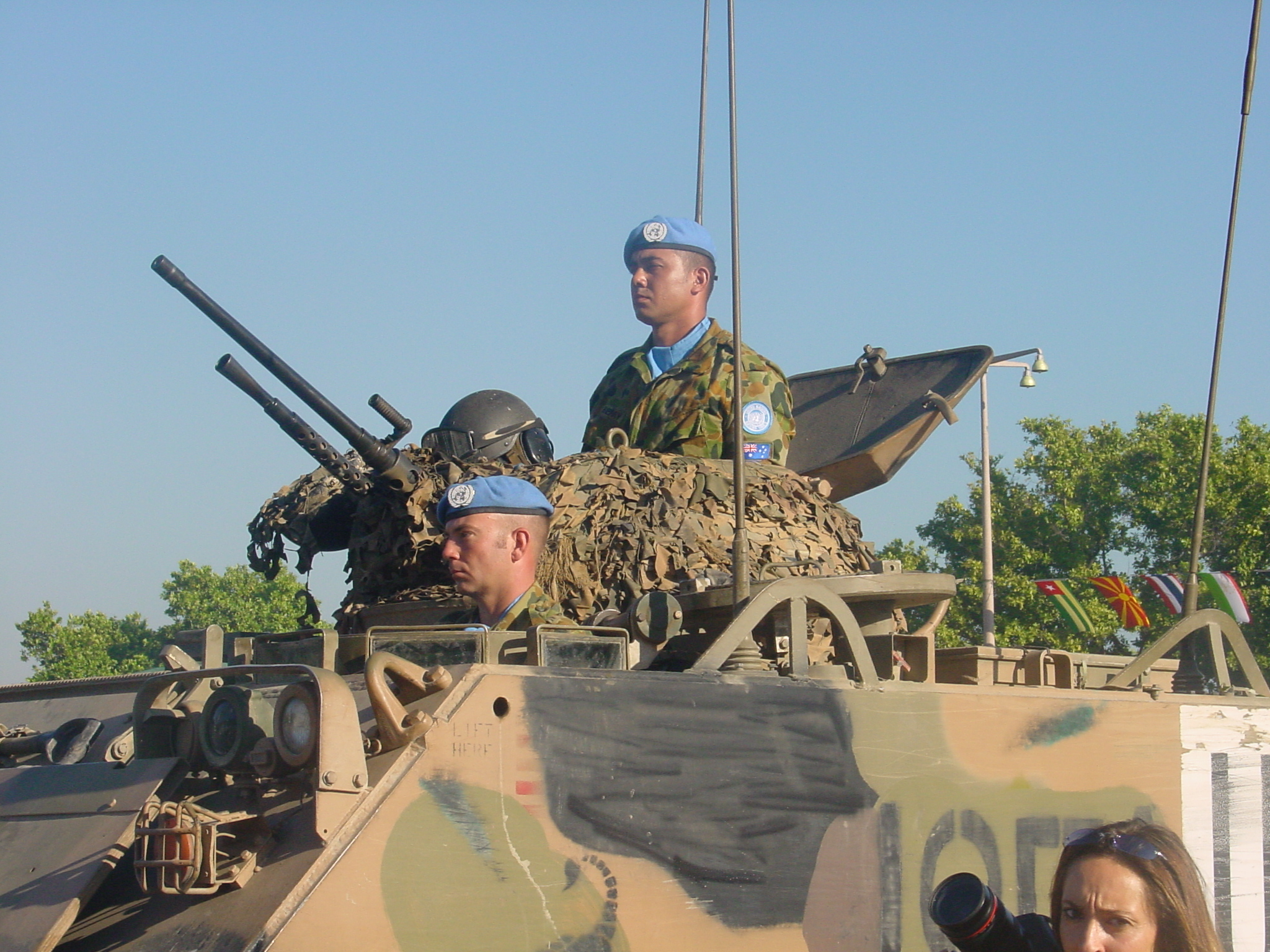
Australian M113 with twin mounted M1919 Browning and M2 Browning Quick Change Barrel machine guns, 17 May 2002

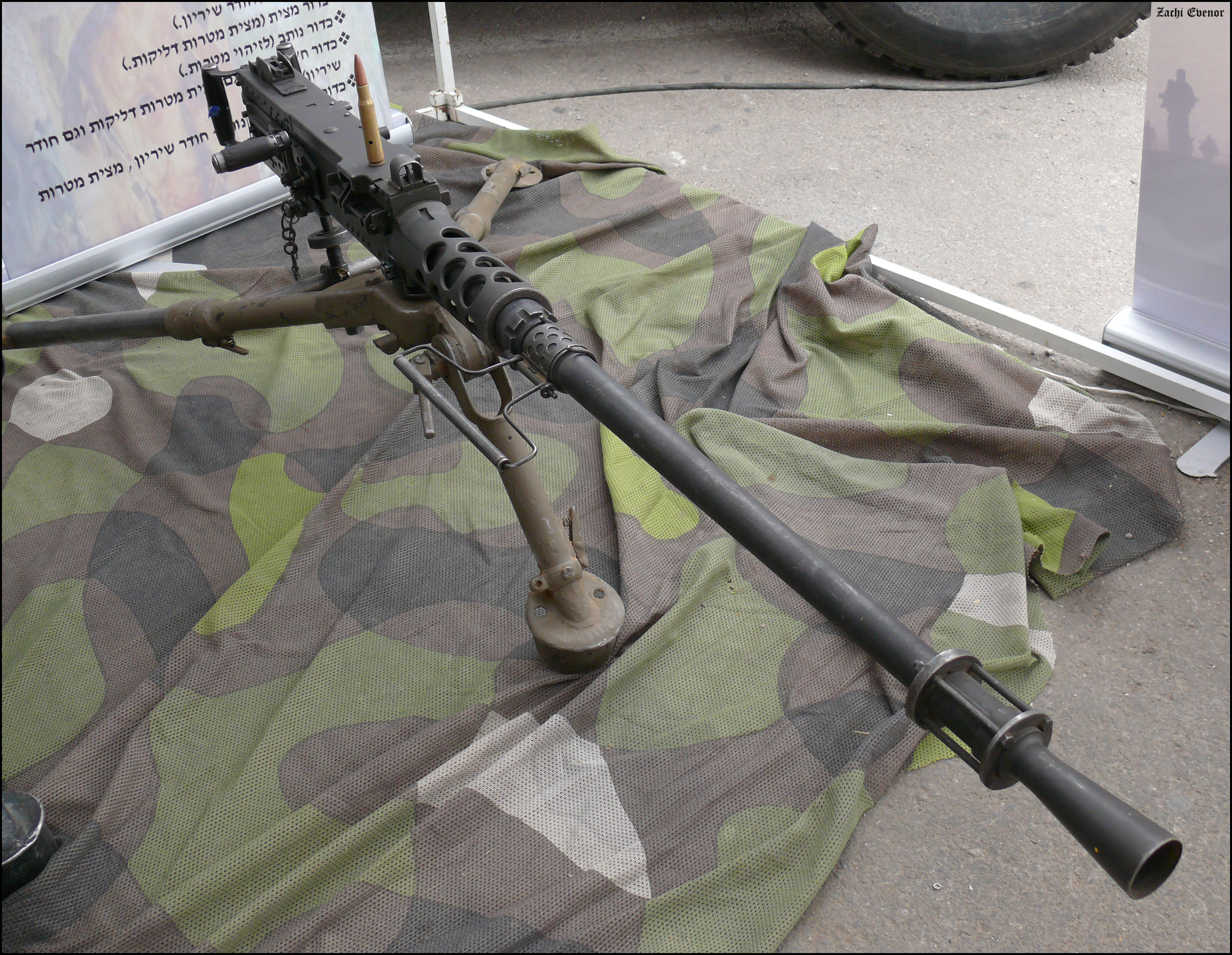
Israel Defense Forces M2HB-QCB

The Commonwealth use of the M2 Browning .50-caliber machine gun (known as the .5 Browning in British and Commonwealth service) began in World War II, though from 1942 it was standard armament on U.S.-built AFVs provided under Lend-Lease such as the M4 Sherman, M7 Priest, M8 Greyhound, or M10 tank destroyer variously used by British, Canadian, Australian, South African, and New Zealand units. Nevertheless, the heavy Browning's effectiveness was praised by many British and Commonwealth soldiers in infantry, armored, and ordnance branches. Many commanders thought that the .50 Browning was the best weapon in its class, certainly the best of the American weapons, including the M1 Garand and M1 Carbine. In North Africa, after Commonwealth units began to obtain sufficient parts, manuals, gauges, and ammunition for the new weapon, the .50 Browning was increasingly used, eventually replacing the 15 mm Besa, but in Italy, it was often deleted from top turret mountings because the mount exposed the operator to low branches and enemy fire. All LRDGs, and some SAS units, used the aircraft (AN/M2) version of the gun, while beam/waist-mounted and turret-mounted Brownings were used later in the war in such aircraft as the Short Sunderland and Lancaster bomber.

After World War II, the .50 Browning continued to see action in Korea and other theaters, in aircraft, tripod (ground), ground AA (hip-ring), and vehicle mounts. One of its most notable actions in a ground role was in a fierce battle with a nine-man Special Air Service team at the Battle of Mirbat in Oman in July 1972, where the heavy Browning and its API ammunition was used to help repulse an assault by 250 Yemeni Adoo guerrillas, though the more famous weapon from the battle is a 25 pounder gun. The Scots Guards used the weapon in the 1982 Falklands War.

A .50-caliber Browning was installed along with a .30-caliber Browning machine gun in each compact one-man turret on M113 APCs used by the Royal Australian Armoured Corps in South Vietnam.

The M2HB has been in service with the Israel Defense Forces since its establishment and has served in all of Israel's wars, operations, and conflicts. In 2012, the IDF upgraded its M2HB machine guns to the M2HB-QCB model, with a heavy quick-change barrel. Today, the M2 serves as an infantry crew-served heavy machine gun, as a remote-controlled external coaxial gun on Merkava main battle tanks, as the main weapon on the Samson RCWS, and as a secondary weapon on Israeli Sea Corps gunboats and missile boats.

Nigerian troops have extensively deployed the .50-caliber Browning, mounted on Otokar Cobra APCs, Panhard VBL M11s and Landcruiser gun-trucks in counterinsurgency operations in the Niger Delta, N.E Nigeria, the Jos Plateau, and in Mali.

=== Sniper rifle ===
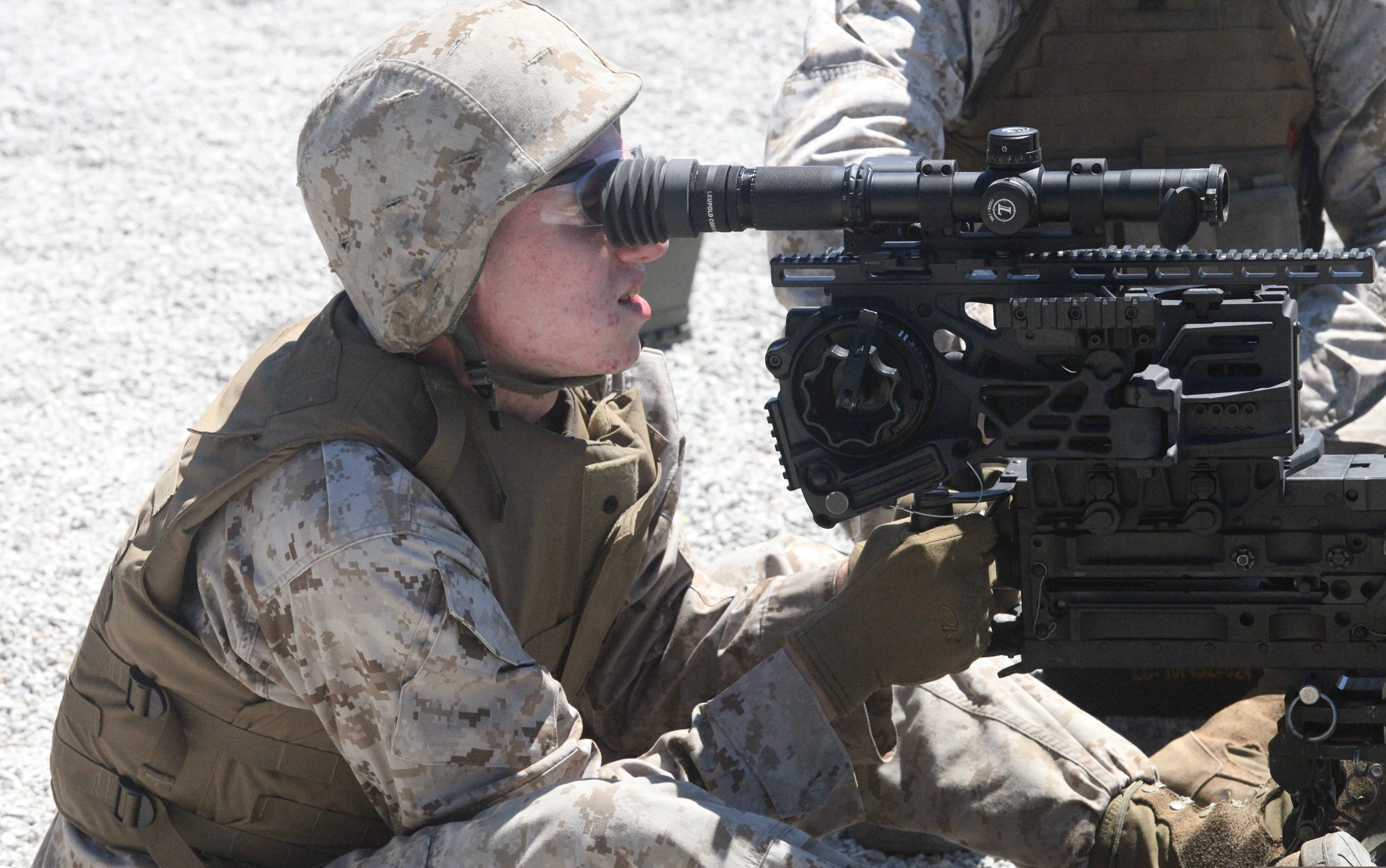
USMC M2 fitted with a Leupold CQBSS variable power scope

The M2 machine gun has also been used as a long-range sniper rifle when equipped with a high-powered telescopic sight. Soldiers during the Korean War used scoped M2s in the role of a sniper rifle, but the practice was most notably used by U.S. Marine Corps sniper Carlos Hathcock during the Vietnam War. Using an Unertl telescopic sight and a mounting bracket of his own design, Hathcock could quickly convert the M2 into a sniper rifle, using the traversing-and-elevating (T&E) mechanism attached to the tripod. When firing semi-automatically, Hathcock hit man-size targets beyond 1,800 metres (2,000 yd)—twice the range of the standard-caliber sniper rifle of the time (a .30-06 Winchester Model 70). Hathcock set the record for the longest confirmed kill at 2,250 metres (2,460 yd)—about 1.4 statute miles, a record which stood until 2002, when it was broken in Afghanistan by Canadian Army sniper Arron Perry.

== Variants and derivatives ==
=== Manufacturers ===
Licensed historic production:

- Aircraft Armaments Incorporated (AAI)
- Australian Defence Industries
- Canadian Arsenals Limited (CAL)
- Colt's Patent Fire Arms Company
- Buffalo Arms Company
- three divisions of General Motors: AC Sparkplug; Frigidaire; and Brown-Lipe-Chapin
- High Standard Manufacturing Company
- Kelsey Hayes Wheel Company
- Saco-Lowell Shops
- Savage Arms Corporation
- Springfield Armory (U.S. arsenal), and
- Wayne Pump Company
- Sumitomo Heavy Industries

Current production (2023):

- Canik Arms
- FN Herstal (Fabrique Nationale)
- General Dynamics
- U.S. Ordnance
- Ohio Ordnance Works Inc, and
- Manroy Engineering (UK)

=== Variants ===
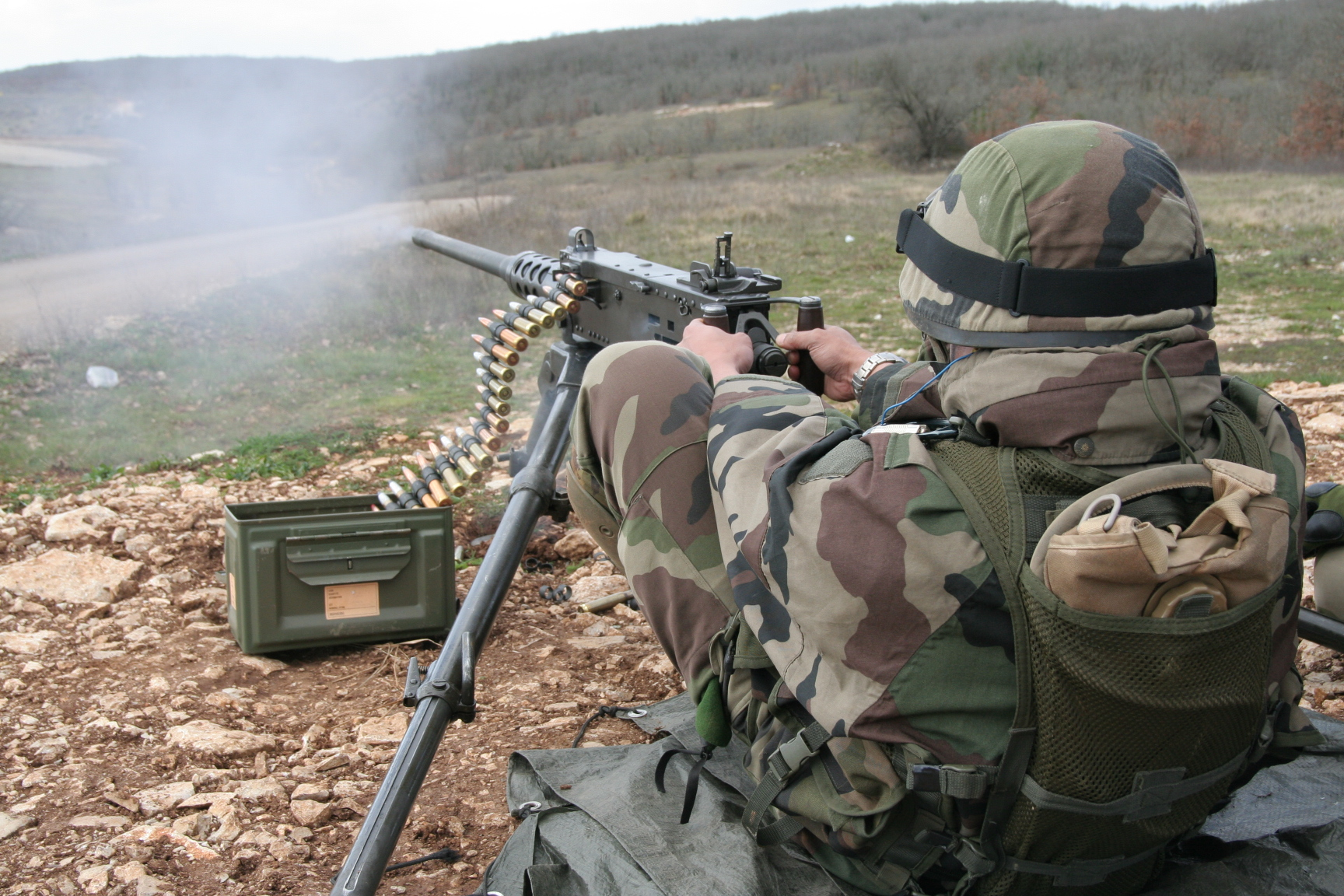
An M2HB in the French Foreign Legion's 2nd Infantry Regiment during an exercise

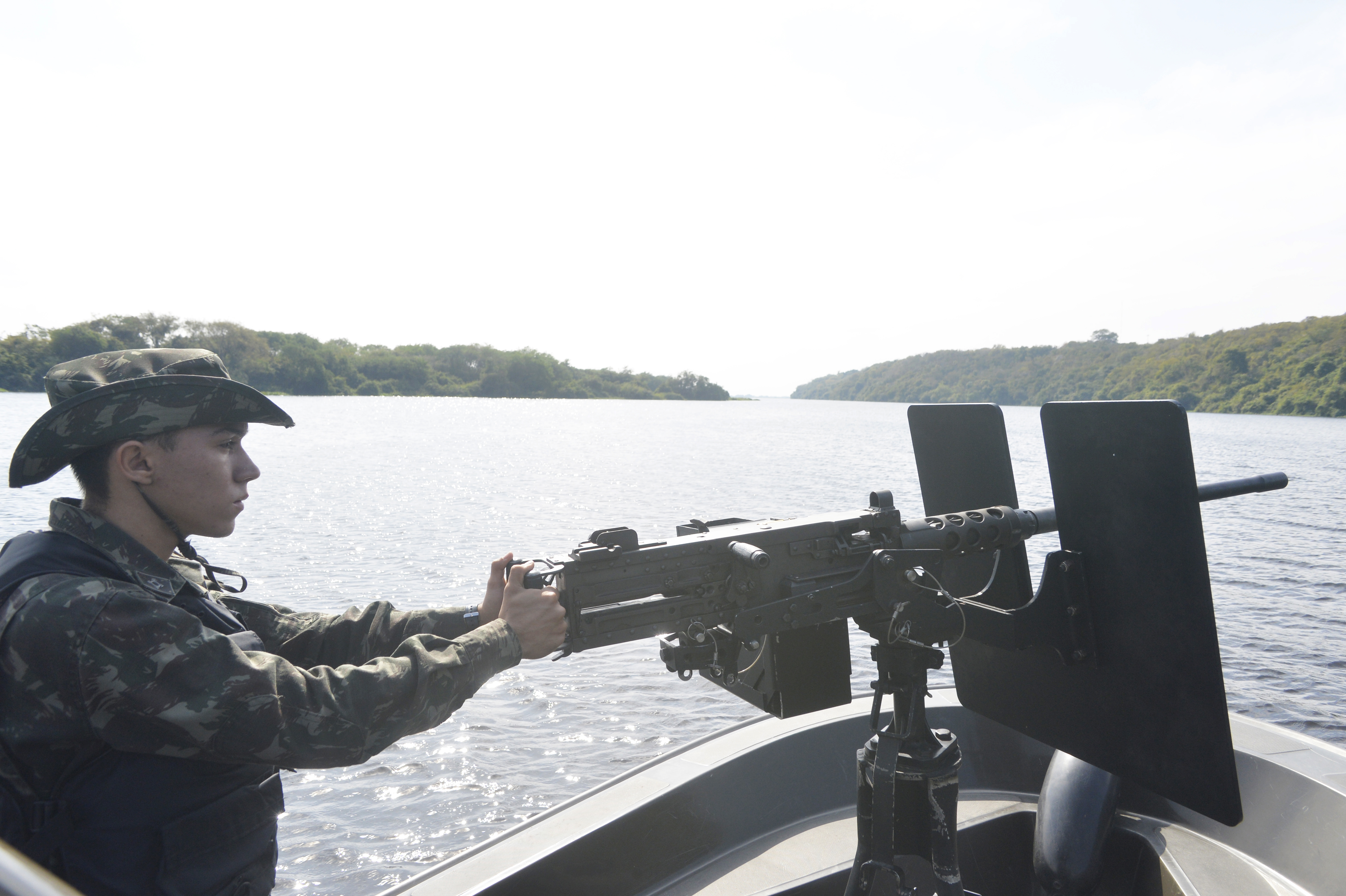
Jungle Infantry soldier of the Brazilian Army manning an M2HB in the Amazon rainforest

The basic M2 was deployed in U.S. service in a number of subvariants, all with separate complete designations as per the U.S. Army system. The basic designation as mentioned in the introduction is Browning Machine Gun, Cal. .50, M2, with others as described below.

The development of the M1921 water-cooled machine gun which led to the M2, meant that the initial M2s were, in fact, water-cooled. These weapons were designated Browning Machine Gun, Cal. .50, M2, Water-Cooled, Flexible. There was no fixed water-cooled version.

Improved air-cooled heavy barrel versions came in three subtypes: the basic infantry model, Browning Machine Gun, Cal. .50, M2, HB, Flexible; a fixed developed for use on the M6 Heavy Tank designated Browning Machine Gun, Cal. .50, M2, HB, Fixed; and a "turret type" whereby "Flexible" M2s were modified slightly for use in tank turrets (this subvariant's designation Browning Machine Gun, Cal. .50, M2, HB, TT was only used for manufacturing, supply, and administration identification and separation from flexible M2s).

A number of additional subvariants were developed after the end of World War II. The M2 Heavy Barrel, M48 Turret Type was developed for the commander's cupola on the M48 Patton tank. The cupola mount on the M48A2 and M48A3 was thoroughly disliked by most tankers, as it proved unreliable in service. An externally mounted M2 was later adopted for the commander's position on the M1 Abrams tanks. Three subvariants were also developed for use by the U.S. Navy on a variety of ships and watercraft including the soft mount and fixed type versions. The fixed types fire from a solenoid trigger and come in left- or right-hand feed variants for use on the Mk 56 Mod 0 dual mount and other mounts.

Huaqing Machinery has made a clone of the M2HB known as the CS/LM6, which was released publicly in 2010 at foreign weapons expo conventions. It was made with a picatinny rail on the receiver in order to have quick installation of various optics. The original M2HB tripod and parts can be used on the CS/LM6.

=== M2A1 ===
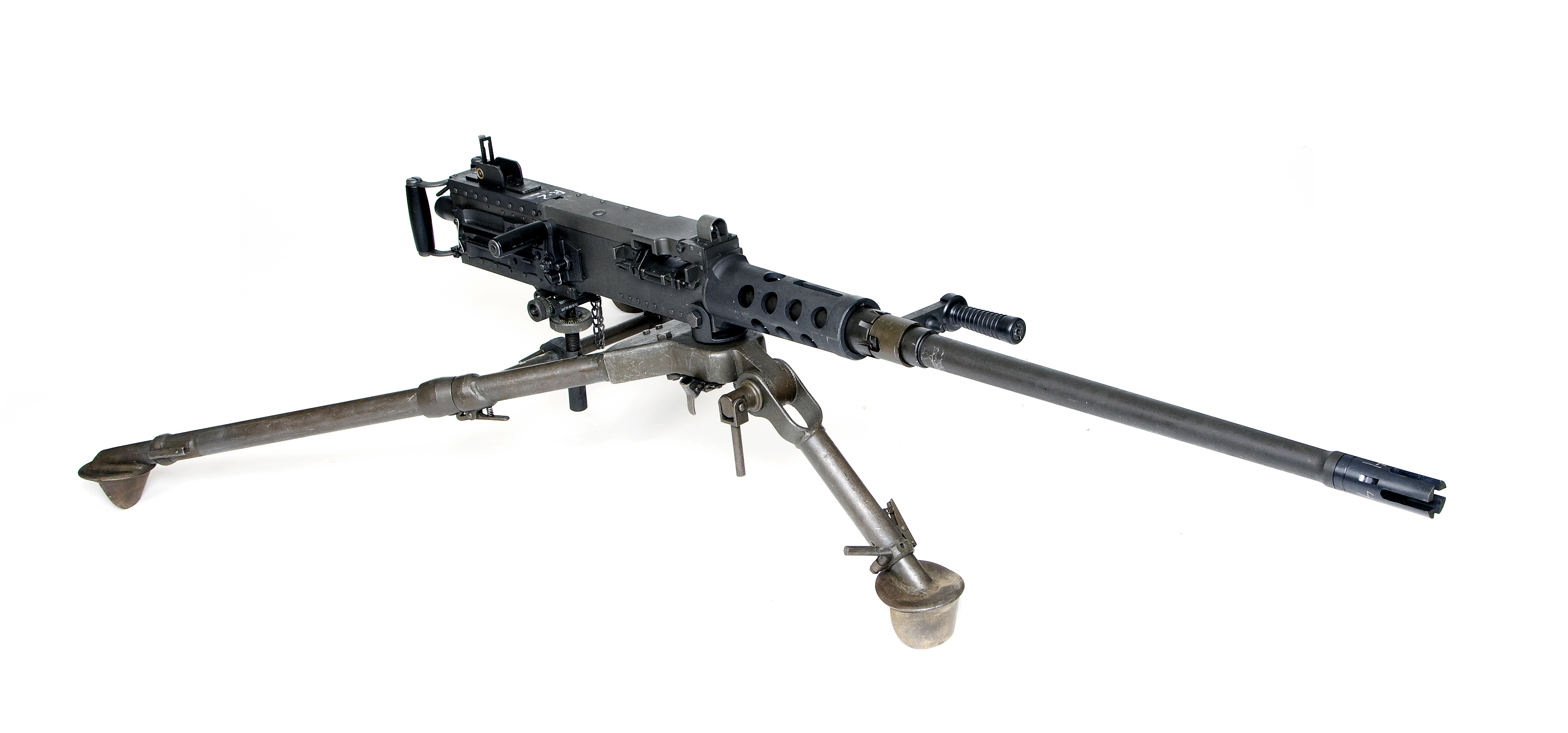
M2E2 modification with quick-change barrel (QCB)

When the M2 was first being designed, John Browning faced two design challenges. With the machine tools available at that time, the dimensions that established the location of the bolt face and the depth of the chamber could not be held tightly enough to control the fit of the cartridge in the chamber. The round can be too tight in the chamber and the gun would not fire, or be too loose in the chamber, resulting in a stoppage or ruptured cartridge. The other dimension that could not be held closely enough was when the firing pin would fall. The solution to these problems was adjustable timing and headspace ("timing" is the adjustment of the gun so that firing takes place when the recoiling parts are in the correct position for firing; "headspace" is the distance between the face of the bolt and the base of the cartridge case, fully seated in the chamber); the operator had to screw the barrel into the barrel extension, moving the barrel toward the bolt face to reach the proper headspace with simple gauges to allow the operator to adjust to the proper dimensions. By the late 20th century, the M2 was the only adjustable headspace weapon in the U.S. inventory. With rising reports of injuries from improperly headspaced weapons, the U.S. military held a competition for a quick-change barrel conversion kit with fixed timing and headspace in 1997. Three companies offered kits and Saco Defense won the competition. However, funding was lost before the design could be fully evaluated and the program ended. In 2007, the military found money to start a new competition. Saco Defense had since been acquired by General Dynamics, which won the competition.

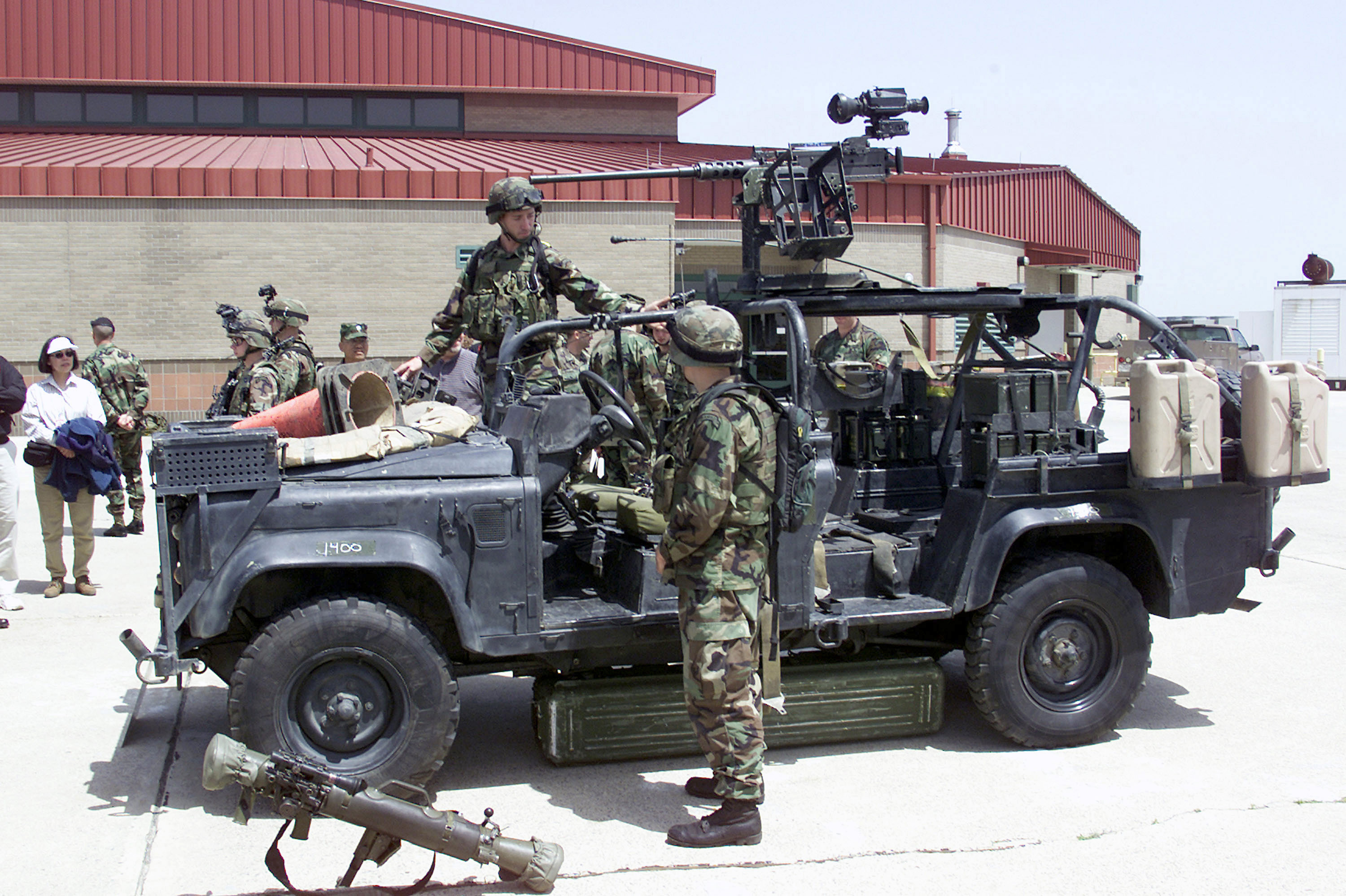
U.S. Army Ranger Special Operations Vehicle armed with RAMO M2HB-QCB machine gun

On 15 October 2010, the M2A1 heavy machine gun was type classified by the U.S. Army. Formerly known as the M2E2, the M2A1 incorporates improvements to the design including a quick-change barrel (QCB) with a removable carrying handle, a new slotted flash suppressor that reduces muzzle flash by 95 percent, fixed headspace and timing, a modified bolt, and a manual trigger block safety. When a standard M2 had a barrel change, the headspace and timing had to be manually set. Improper adjustment could damage the weapon and cause serious injury to the user. Fixed headspace and timing reduces risk, and the carrying handle allows the barrel to be switched in seconds. In June 2011, the Army began conversion of M2HB machine guns to M2A1s. The M2A1 was named one of the greatest Army inventions of 2011. As of 30 November 2012, 8,300 built or converted M2A1s had been fielded by the U.S. Army; the program upgraded the Army's entire M2 inventory of more than 54,000 guns. The U.S. Marine Corps upgraded all of their ground-mounted M2s to M2A1 standard. The first phase of conversions was completed in March 2017, with 3,600 M2A1s planned to be fielded by the Marines in total. The Israel Defense Forces adopted the M2HB-QCB (the commercial version of the M2A1) in 2012 as a replacement to the M2HB.

=== 13,2 mm FN Browning ===
One derivative of the M2 Browning is the Mitrailleuse d´Avion Browning - F.N. Calibre 13,2 mm, more commonly known as the FN Browning M.1939. The FN Browning M.1939 was a heavily modified M2 Browning for aircraft use designed by FN Herstal for export. Their aim was to make a light, reliable heavy machine gun with the same damage output as a 20 mm autocannon. To achieve this, they raised the firing rate to 1080 rpm and gave it a more powerful cartridge in the form of the 13.2×99mm Hotchkiss. This cartridge was a popular Eurasian analog of .50 BMG developed independently in 1920s with a 13.2 mm bullet (.52 in) and more propellant. A new projectile was designed for this gun. It was of a high-explosive type and was designed to take down a small aircraft with a single hit. Tests showed that it was very effective against both cloth- and aluminum-skinned aircraft.

Due to the aforementioned improvements, the gun received interest from numerous nations when it entered the export market in 1939. Due to the start of World War II and the invasion of Belgium, it was exported only to Romania and Sweden. Sweden was able to buy the majority of the weapons along with the blueprints to produce the weapon on their own without paying for a license. In Sweden, the weapon received the designation Automatkanon m/39 ("Autocannon m/39"), Akan m/39 for short, and was later produced by Ericsson as the Akan m/39A. Sweden also gave the blueprints to Finland so they could produce the weapon. Since Finland was already producing 12.7 mm ammunition, the Finnish variant was rechambered to 12.7 mm (.50 BMG). The Finnish variant was designated VKT 12,70 LKk/42 and was produced by Finland.

== Aircraft guns ==
=== .50 Browning AN/M2 ===
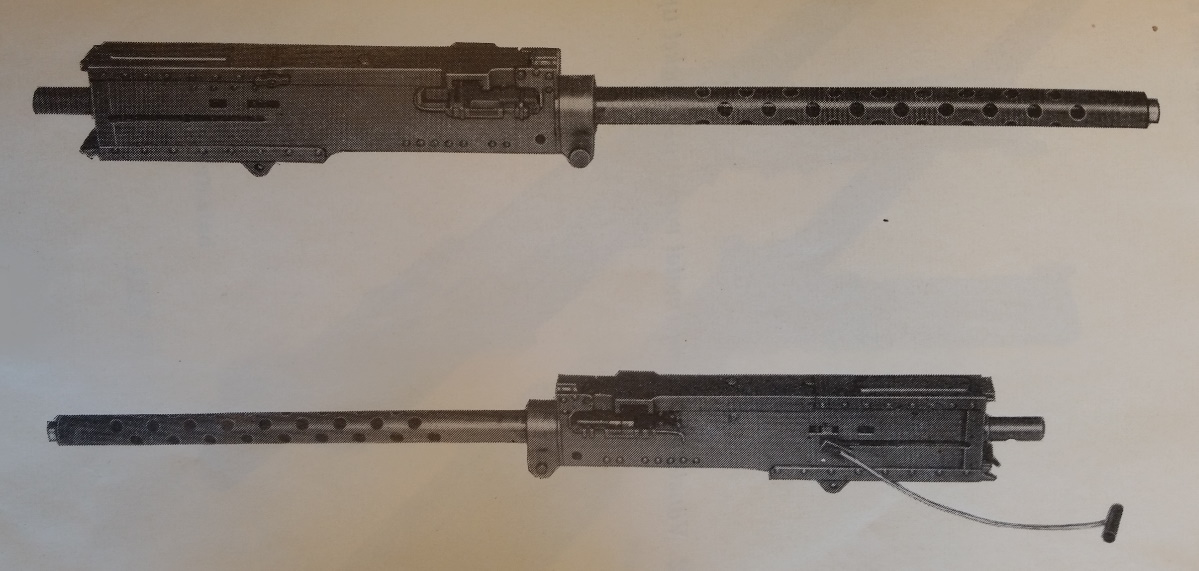
.50 AN/M2 aircraft machine gun

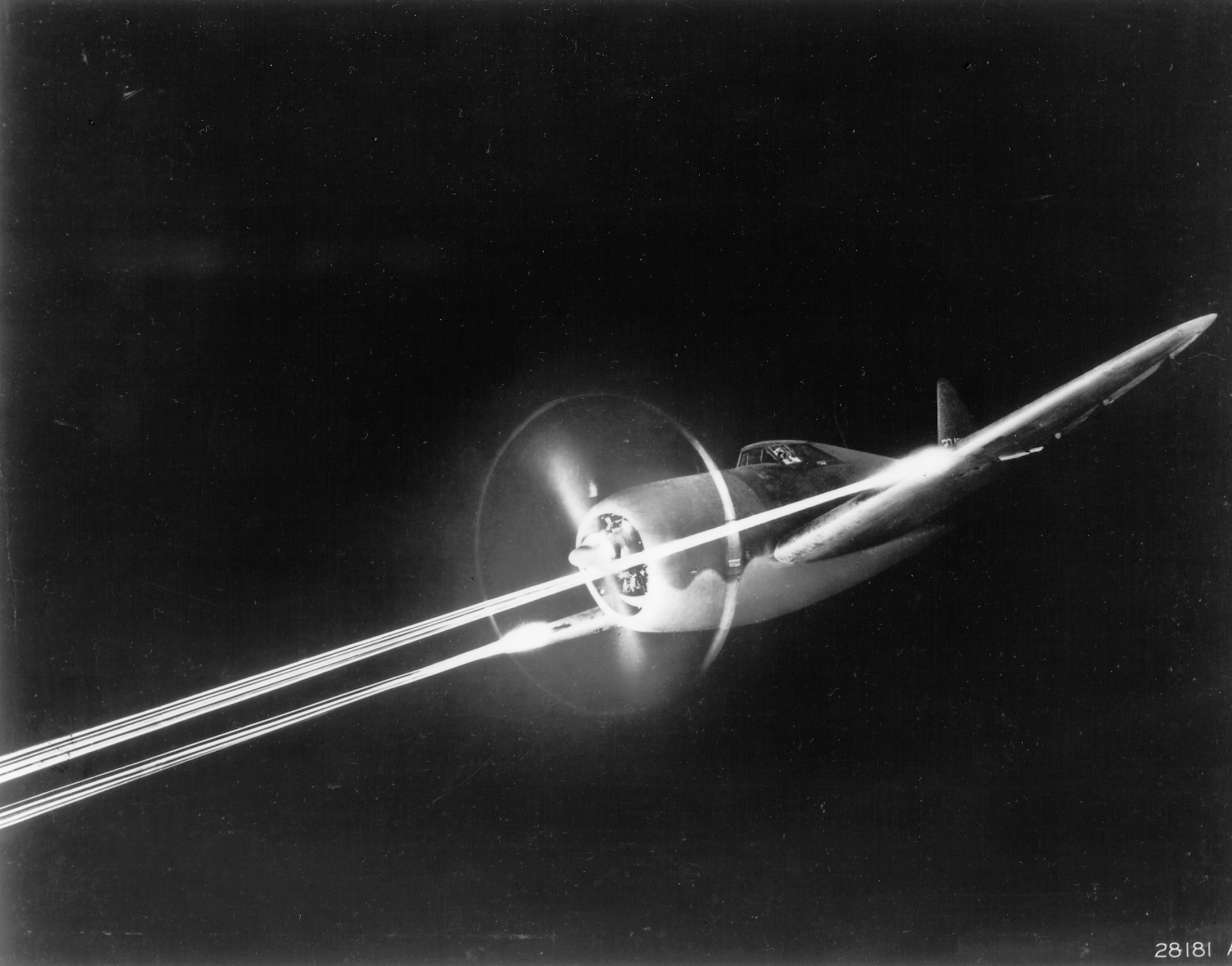
A P-47 Thunderbolt firing its eight AN/M2 machine guns

The M2 heavy machine gun was widely used during World War II, and in later postwar conflicts, as a remote or flexible aircraft gun. For fixed (offensive) or flexible (defensive) guns used in aircraft, a dedicated M2 version was developed called the ".50 Browning AN/M2" or the "12.7 mm AN/M2". The "AN" stands for "Army/Navy", since the gun was developed jointly for use by both services. The AN/M2 designation was also used for other aircraft guns and therefore it is important to write the caliber before the designation.

The 12.7 mm AN/M2 had a cyclic rate of 600–800 rounds per minute, with the ability to be fired from an electrically operated remote-mount solenoid trigger when installed as a fixed gun. Cooled by the aircraft's slip-stream, the air-cooled 12.7 mm AN/M2 was fitted with a substantially lighter 36-inch (91 cm) length barrel, reducing the weight of the complete unit to 61 pounds (28 kg), which also had the effect of increasing the rate of fire. The full official designation for this weapon was "Browning Machine Gun, Aircraft, Cal. .50, AN/M2" (Fixed) or (Flexible).

The 12.7 mm AN/M2 was used on many aircraft during WWII, as it served as the main aircraft armament in the U.S. military. Most U.S. fighter aircraft were armed with four, six or eight AN/M2 MGs mounted in the wings. Some examples being the Curtiss P-40, Republic P-47 Thunderbolt, and North American P-51 Mustang for the USAAF and the F4F, F6F, and Vought F4U Corsair for the U.S. Navy. For bombers, the AN/M2 was used in both flexible and fixed positions for both offensive and defensive use. In flexible defensive positions, the Boeing B-17G Flying Fortress heavy bomber was armed with 13 AN/M2 guns in both turreted and flexible positions. In fixed offensive configurations, like on the North American B-25 Mitchell, commonly carried 6 to 12 fixed guns for strafing.

In foreign use, the AN/M2 is often just referred to as the M2 Browning. In Sweden, it was redesignated 12,7 mm automatkanon m/45 (short 12.7mm akan m/45) meaning 12.7 mm autocannon m/45. The Swedish Air Force used a different designation system which recognized the incendiary rounds as grenades, thus it was called autocannon. The AN/M2 was also produced in Finland under the export name Colt MG 53-2.

=== M296 ===
The XM296/M296 is a further development of the AN/M2 machine gun for the OH-58 Kiowa Warrior helicopter. The M296 differs from previous remote firing variants in that it has an adjustable firing rate (500–850 rpm), while lacking a bolt latch (allowing single-shot operation). As an air-cooled gun used aboard a relatively slow rotary-wing aircraft, the M296 has a burst restriction rate of 50 rounds per minute sustained fire or 150 rounds per minute maximum while conducting peacetime training requirements; the combat firing rate is unrestricted but a ten-minute cooling period after prolonged firing is mandated to avoid stoppages due to overheating.

=== XM213/M213, XM218, GAU-15/A, GAU-16/A, and GAU-18/A ===
The XM213/M213 was a modernization and adaptation of existing .50-caliber AN/M2s in inventory for use as a pintle-mounted door gun on helicopters using the M59 armament subsystem.

The GAU-15/A, formerly identified as the XM218, is a lightweight member of the M2/M3 family. The GAU-16/A was an improved GAU-15/A with modified grip and sight assemblies for similar applications. Both of these weapons were used as a part of the A/A49E-11 armament subsystem (also known as the Defensive Armament System).

The GAU-18/A is a lightweight variant of the M2/M3 and is used on the USAF's MH-53 Pave Low and HH-60 Pave Hawk helicopters. These weapons use the M2HB barrel and are typically set up as left-hand feed, right-hand charging weapons, but on the HH-60 Pave Hawks that use the EGMS (External Gun Mount System), the gun is isolated from the shooter by a recoil-absorbing cradle and all weapons are set up as right-hand charge but vary between left- and right-hand feed depending on what side of the aircraft it is on. A feed chute adapter is attached to the left- or right-hand feed pawl bracket allowing the weapon to receive ammunition through a feed chute system connected to externally mounted ammunition containers holding 600 rounds each.

=== AN/M3, M3P, and M3M/GAU-21/A ===
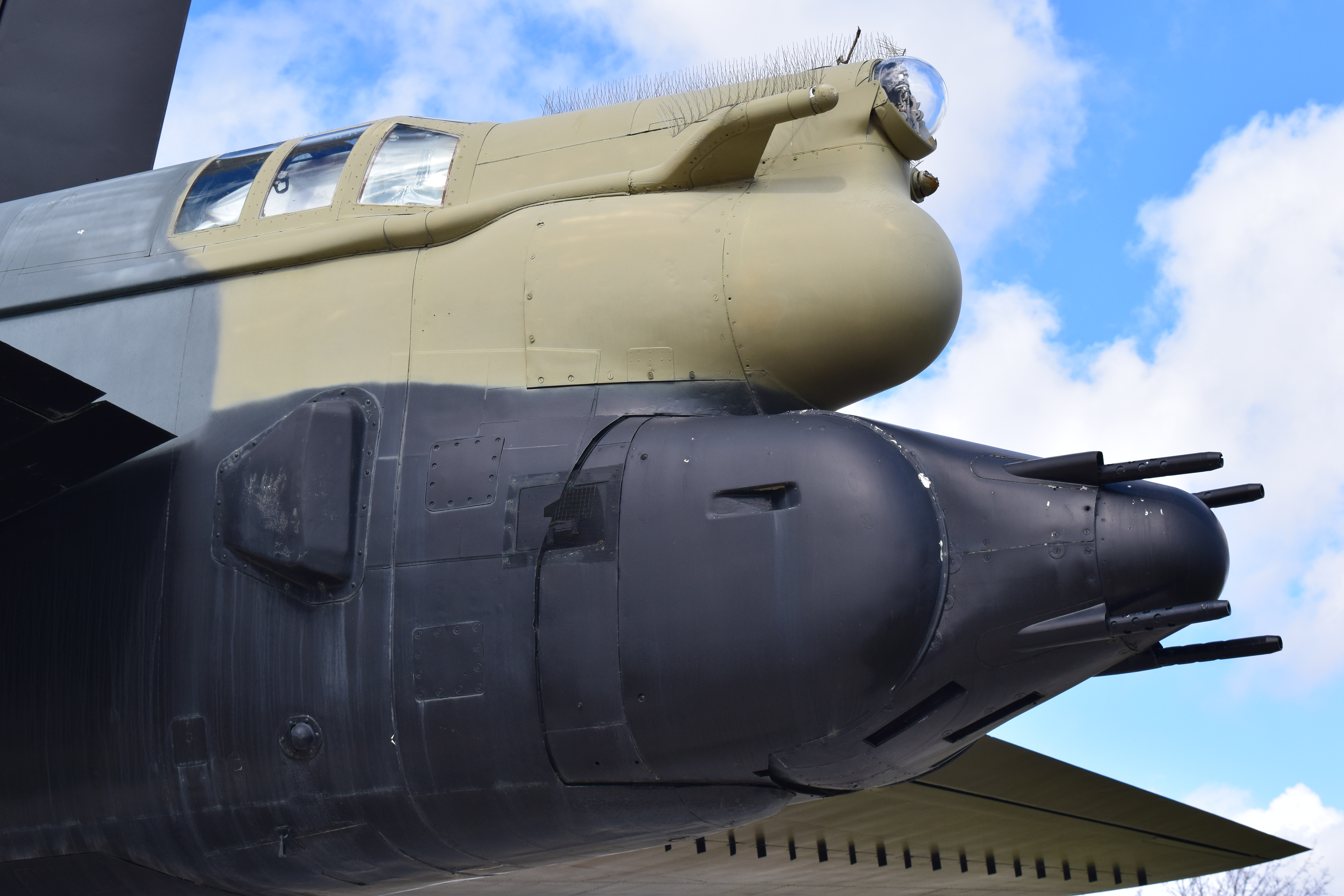
AN/M3 quad mount on a B-52D

During World War II, a faster-firing Browning was developed for aircraft use. The AN/M3 increased the rate of fire to around 1,200 rounds per minute while firing the same round with minimal change in weight or size. The AN/M3 was used in South Korea on the F-82 Twin Mustang, F-86 Sabre, F-84 Thunderjet, and F-80 Shooting Star, and in Vietnam in the XM14/SUU-12/A gun pod. Two are installed in the Embraer EMB 314 Super Tucano aircraft as a fixed wing-mounted standard weapon as designated as M3W with minor modification with reduced weight barrel, electronic box triggered from the cockpit with 250 rounds each.

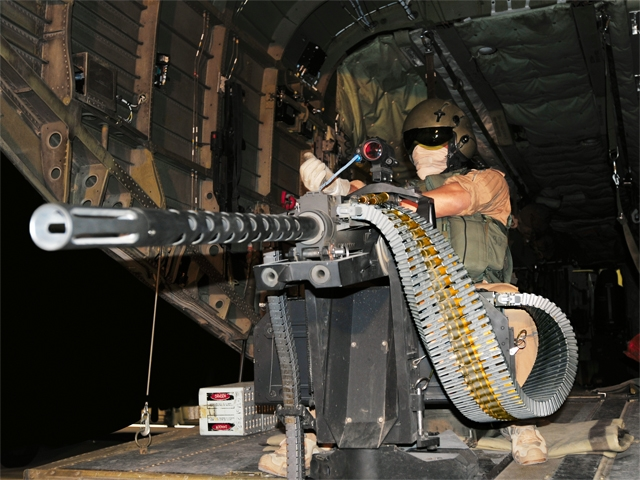
A German Army ramp gunner manning an M3M on a CH-53 Sea Stallion

The M3M and M3P are developed from the AN/M3 by FN Herstal and are solely manufactured by them. In particular, they both fire from open bolts compared to the M2's closed bolt operation. The fixed, remote-firing version, the FN M3P, is employed on the Avenger Air Defense System and was used on the OH-58D, augmenting the XM296 .50-cal. machine gun. The FN M3M flexible machine gun conversely can fire without electric or hydraulic power. It has been adopted by the U.S. Navy under the designation GAU-21/A for use on helicopters. The GAU-21/A is also being used by the U.S. Marine Corps to upgrade from the XM218/GAU-16 .50-cal. machine gun for the CH-53E, on the UH-1Y Venom, on the Canadian Forces' CH-146 Griffon via the INGRESS upgrade and is to be used on the CH-53K. The Air Force is looking to replace the GAU-18 on the HH-60G Pave Hawk with the GAU-21 because of its higher 1,100 rpm rate of fire, longer 10,000-round barrel life, and lower recoil through the use of a soft mount. The M3M is also the primary machine gun used by the British Royal Navy's Fleet Air Arm for helicopter armament on Wildcat and Merlin aircraft. It is also used by the German Bundeswehr on their NH-90 helicopters.

== Myths regarding use against personnel ==
It is often stated in military circles that the use of the M2 Browning against human targets is prohibited under the Geneva Conventions. This is false; the Geneva Conventions, contrary to popular belief, do not regulate the use of any weapon of war. They only regulate the treatment and protection of prisoners of war and non-combatants. There has been controversy surrounding the use of .50-caliber ammunition against enemy personnel, specifically Raufoss Mk 211 explosive/incendiary rounds. The Saint Petersburg Declaration of 1868 states that the "military or naval" use of explosive or incendiary projectiles with a mass of under 400 g (14 oz) is forbidden by its signatory parties.

Similarly, the Hague Conventions of 1899 and 1907, which do regulate the use of specific weaponry, do not prohibit the use of .50-caliber weapons like the M2 against personnel. The U.S. Army's field manual for the M2 includes instructions on how to employ the weapon against personnel. One possible source of the misconception is from World War II, when American half-track units in Germany were told to stop firing their M2s at ground targets, to conserve ammunition in case of a Luftwaffe attack. Also, U.S. troops were told to use their M2s only against enemy equipment due to shortages of ammunition during the Korean or Vietnam War. It is also possible that a restriction during the latter period limiting the use of the M40 recoilless rifle's .50-caliber spotting gun to destroy enemy equipment only, since the M40 was meant to be used against armor and firing it at personnel would give away their position before it could be used as intended, was mistakenly applied to all .50-caliber weapons.

== Users ==
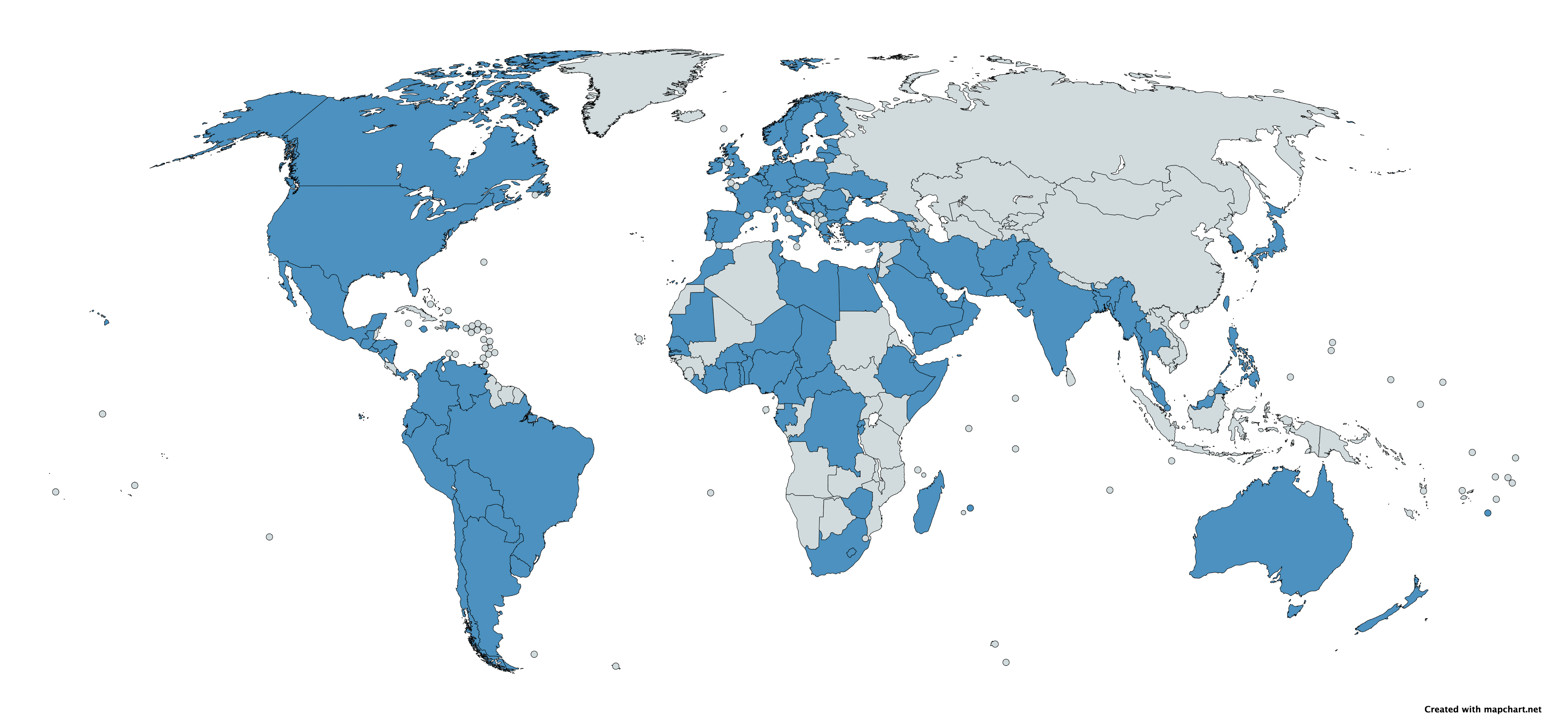
Map with M2 Browning users in blue

The M2 family has been widely used abroad, primarily in its basic infantry configuration. A brief listing of designations for M2 family weapons follows:

Country	Is NATO member	Designation	Description
Afghanistan	No		12.7 × 99 mm Browning M2HB machine gun
Argentina	No	M2HB, AN/M3	12.7 × 99 mm Browning M2HB machine gun
Australia	Global Partner	M2HB-QCB (M2HB Quick Change Barrel)	12.7 × 99 mm Browning M2HB machine gun
Austria	No	üsMG M2	12.7 × 99 mm Browning M2HB machine gun
Azerbaijan	No	Canik M2 QCB	12.7 × 99 mm Browning M2HB machine gun
Bahrain	No		12.7 × 99 mm Browning M2HB machine gun
Bangladesh	No	K6 machine gun (Imported from South Korea)	12.7 × 99 mm Browning M2HB machine gun
Belgium	Yes		12.7 × 99 mm Browning M2HB machine gun
Benin	No		12.7 × 99 mm Browning M2HB machine gun
Bolivia	No		12.7 × 99 mm Browning M2HB machine gun
Brazil	No	mtr .50 M2 HB "BROWNING" and M3	12.7 × 99 mm Browning M2HB machine gun
Bulgaria	Yes		12.7 × 99 mm Browning M2HB machine gun
Burkina Faso	No		12.7 × 99 mm Browning M2HB machine gun
Bosnia	No		12.7 × 99 mm Browning M2HB machine gun
Burundi	No		12.7 × 99 mm Browning M2HB machine gun
Cameroon	No		12.7 × 99 mm Browning M2HB machine gun
Canada	Yes	FN M2HB-QCB, GAU-21	12.7 × 99 mm Browning M2HB machine gun
Central African Republic	No		12.7 × 99 mm Browning M2HB machine gun
Chad	No		12.7 × 99 mm Browning M2HB machine gun
Chile	No		12.7 × 99 mm Browning M2HB machine gun
Colombia	Global Partner		12.7 × 99 mm Browning M2HB machine gun
Cyprus	No		12.7 × 99 mm Browning M2HB machine gun
Croatia	Yes		12.7 × 99 mm Browning M2HB machine gun
Democratic Republic of Congo	No		12.7 × 99 mm Browning M2HB machine gun
Denmark	Yes	m/50 TMG	12.7 × 99 mm Browning M2HB machine gun
Denmark	Yes	M/2001 TMG	12.7 × 99 mm FNH M2HB-QCB
Denmark	Yes		12.7 × 99 mm FNH M3M machine gun
Czech Republic	Yes		12.7 × 99 mm FNH M2HB-QCB
Djibouti	No		12.7 × 99 mm Browning M2HB machine gun
Dominican Republic	No		12.7 × 99 mm Browning M2HB machine gun
Ecuador	No		12.7 × 99 mm Browning M2HB machine gun
Egypt	No		12.7 × 99 mm Browning M2HB machine gun
El Salvador	No		12.7 × 99 mm Browning M2HB machine gun
Estonia	Yes	Browning M2 sometimes as Raskekuulipilduja Browning M2	12.7 × 99 mm Browning M2HB. Usually mounted on vehicles, such as the pasi XA-180 and XA-188, but the tripod version is also in use.
Ethiopia	No		12.7 × 99 mm Browning M2HB machine gun
France	Yes	MIT 50 (Mitrailleuse cal. 50)	12.7 × 99 mm Browning M2HB machine gun
Finland	Yes	12,7 RSKK 2005	12.7 × 99 mm Browning M2HB machine gun in protector remote weapon stations in Patria AMV APCs.
Gabon	No	12.7 × 99 mm Browning M2HB machine gun	
Gambia	No	12.7 × 99 mm Browning M2HB machine gun	
Ghana	No	12.7 × 99 mm Browning M2HB machine gun	
Georgia	No		
Germany	Yes	M3M, MG50	Produced by FN Herstal.
Greece	Yes		12.7 × 99 mm Browning M2HB machine gun
Guatemala	No		12.7 × 99 mm Browning M2HB machine gun
Honduras	No		12.7 × 99 mm Browning M2HB machine gun
India	No		12.7 × 99 mm Browning M2HB machine gun
Indonesia	No		12.7 × 99 mm Browning M2HB machine gun
Iran	No		12.7 × 99 mm Browning M2HB machine gun
Ireland	No	.5 Heavy Machine Gun (HMG)	
Israel	No	מק"כ 0.5 |12.7 × 99 mm M2HB-QCB, used by all ground forces (infantry, armored fighting vehicles and tanks) and naval forces	
Italy	Yes		12.7 × 99 mm Browning M2HB machine gun
Ivory Coast	No		12.7 × 99 mm Browning M2HB machine gun
Jamaica	No		12.7 × 99 mm Browning M2HB machine gun
Japan	Global Partner	12.7mm Heavy Machine Gun M2	12.7 × 99 mm Browning M2HB machine gun
Jordan	No		12.7 × 99 mm Browning M2HB machine gun
Katanga	No		12.7 × 99 mm Browning M2HB machine gun
South Korea	Global Partner	K6 machine gun (standard HMG), MG50 (being phased out), M3M (used by Cheonghae Unit)	The Armed Forces received 664 M2s before the Korean War, and 4,445 were in service by the end of the war. Later, produced locally by Yehwa Shotgun.
Kuwait	No		12.7 × 99 mm Browning M2HB machine gun
Lebanon	No		12.7 × 99 mm Browning M2HB machine gun
Lesotho	No		12.7 × 99 mm Browning M2HB machine gun
Liberia	No		12.7 × 99 mm Browning M2HB machine gun
Libya	No		12.7 × 99 mm Browning M2HB and M3 machine guns
Latvia	Yes	M2HB-QCB	12.7 × 99 mm Browning M2HB machine gun
Lithuania	Yes		12.7 × 99 mm Browning M2HB machine gun
Luxembourg	Yes	Mitrailleuse .50 M2 HB	12.7 × 99 mm Browning M2HB machine gun
Madagascar	No		12.7 × 99 mm Browning M2HB machine gun
Malaysia	No		12.7 × 99 mm Browning M2HB machine gun
Mauritania	No		12.7 × 99 mm Browning M2HB machine gun
Mauritius	No		12.7 × 99 mm Browning M2HB machine gun
Mexico	No		12.7 × 99 mm Browning M2HB machine gun
Morocco	No		12.7 × 99 mm Browning M2HB machine gun
Myanmar	No		12.7 × 99 mm Browning M2HB machine gun
Netherlands	Yes		12.7 × 99 mm Browning M2HB machine gun
New Zealand	Global Partner		12.7 × 99 mm Browning M2HB machine gun
Nicaragua	No		12.7 × 99 mm Browning M2HB machine gun
Niger	No		12.7 × 99 mm Browning M2HB machine gun
Nigeria	No		12.7 × 99 mm Browning M2HB machine gun
Norway	Yes	12,7 mitraljøse	12.7 × 99 mm Browning M2HB machine gun
Oman	No		12.7 × 99 mm Browning M2HB machine gun
Pakistan	Global Partner		12.7 × 99 mm Browning M2HB machine gun
Palau	CoFA Member		12.7 × 99 mm Browning M2HB machine gun
Panama	No		12.7 × 99 mm Browning M2HB machine gun
Paraguay	No		12.7 × 99 mm Browning M2HB machine gun
Peru	No		12.7 × 99 mm Browning M2HB machine gun
Philippines	No	M3P	12.7 × 99 mm Browning M2HB machine gun
Poland	Yes	GAU-21	12.7 × 99 mm Browning M2HB machine gun
Portugal	Yes	m/951	12.7 × 99 mm Browning M2HB machine gun
Qatar	No		12.7 × 99 mm Browning M2HB machine gun
Romania	Yes		12.7 × 99 mm Browning M2HB machine gun
Rwanda	No		12.7 × 99 mm Browning M2HB machine gun
Saudi Arabia	No		12.7 × 99 mm Browning M2HB machine gun
Senegal	No		12.7 × 99 mm Browning M2HB machine gun
Serbia	No		12.7 × 99 mm Browning M2HB machine gun
Singapore	No		12.7 × 99 mm Browning M2HB machine gun
Slovenia	Yes	FN HERSTAL M2HB-QCB Heavy Machine Gun	12.7 × 99 mm Browning M2HB machine gun
Somalia	No		12.7 × 99 mm Browning M2HB machine gun
South Africa	No	12.7mm L4 Browning Machine Gun	12.7 × 99 mm Browning M2HB machine gun
Soviet Union	No	M2 AA variant, Lend-Lease, 3100 pieces	12.7 × 99 mm Browning M2HB machine gun
Spain	Yes		12.7 × 99 mm Browning M2HB machine gun
Sweden	Yes		12.7 × 99 mm Browning M2HB machine gun
Switzerland	No	MG 64	12.7 × 99 mm Browning M2HB machine gun
Sri Lanka	No		12.7 × 99 mm Browning M2HB machine gun
Syria	No		12.7 × 99 mm Browning M2HB machine gun
Taiwan	No		12.7 × 99 mm Browning M2HB machine gun
Thailand	No		12.7 × 99 mm Browning M2HB machine gun
Togo	No		12.7 × 99 mm Browning M2HB machine gun
Tonga			12.7 × 99 mm Browning M2HB machine gun
Tunisia			12.7 × 99 mm Browning M2HB machine gun
Turkey	Yes		12.7 × 99 mm Browning M2HB machine gun
Ukraine	No		
United Arab Emirates	No		
United Kingdom	Yes	M2	Original U.S.-made model
United Kingdom	Yes	Mk 1	M2 with a 36-inch barrel
United Kingdom	Yes	L1A1, L1A2	12.7 × 99 mm Browning M2HB machine gun with a 36-inch barrel (L1A1) or 45-inch barrel (L1A2); mounted on tripods, anti-aircraft stands, or WMIK-fitted Land Rovers
United Kingdom	Yes	L6A1	12.7 × 99 mm Browning M2HB machine gun; ranging gun for the L7 105 mm tank gun on the Centurion tank
United Kingdom	Yes	L11A1	12.7 × 99 mm Browning M2HB machine gun; ranging gun
United Kingdom	Yes	L21A1	12.7 × 99 mm Browning M2HB machine gun; ranging gun for the 120 mm tank gun on the Chieftain tank
United Kingdom	Yes	L111A1	12.7 × 99 mm M2HB - QCB machine gun
United Kingdom	Yes	L114A1	12.7 × 99 mm M3M door gun for use on Commando Helicopter Force and other helicopter units' airframes.
United States	Yes	Browning Caliber .50 M2, M2HB, XM218/GAU-16, GAU-21	12.7 × 99 mm Browning M2HB machine gun
Uruguay	No		12.7 × 99 mm Browning M2HB machine gun
Venezuela	No		12.7 × 99 mm Browning M2HB machine gun
Vietnam	No		12.7 × 99 mm Browning M2HB machine gun
Yemen	No		12.7 × 99 mm Browning M2HB machine gun
Zimbabwe	No		

== See also ==
- DShK, NSV, and Kord, 12.7mm machine guns, Soviet/Russian equivalents.
- FN BRG-15, 15.5mm caliber machine gun
- HMG PK-16, 12.7×108mm Pakistani equivalent
- KPV heavy machine gun, 14.5mm caliber machine gun
- List of crew-served weapons of the U.S. Armed Forces
- List of individual weapons of the U.S. Armed Forces
- List of U.S. Army weapons by supply catalog designation
- M85 machine gun, a vehicle-borne replacement for the M2 that proved unreliable and was removed from service.
- XM312, XM806, U.S. prototype heavy machine guns that failed to replace the M2.
- MG 131 machine gun, World War II 13mm German aircraft-mounted gun
- MG 18 TuF, a German 13.2mm machine gun from WWI
- Type 77/85, W85, Type 89, Type 171 12.7mm machine guns, Chinese equivalents.

Records
Preceded by M1903 Springfield	Longest confirmed combat sniper-shot kill 1967–2002; 2,286 m (2,500 yd) by Carlos Hathcock	Succeeded by McMillan TAC-50
