= Petrograd (disambiguation) =

Petrograd (Russian: Петроград) is the former name of the second largest city of Russia, now known as Saint Petersburg.

Petrograd may also refer to:

== Places ==
- Central Petrograd, Petrograd, Russia; the city centre
- Petrograd Island, Petrograd, Russia; the origin of the old city of Petrograd
- Petrograd Side, Petrograd, Russia; the portion of Petrograd lying on islands in the Neva Delta; see Geography of Saint Petersburg
- Petrograd Metropolis electoral district (Russian Constituent Assembly election, 1917)
- Petrograd Military District, Empire of Russia
- Petrograd Governorate, Tsardom of Russia

== Military ==
- Battle of Petrograd (1919), Russian Civil War
- Siege of Petrograd (1940s), WWII
- 2nd Petrograd Infantry Division

== Other uses ==
- University of Petrograd, Petrograd, Russia

== See also ==
- Petrograd formula
- Petrograd Standard
- New Petrograd, New Jersey, USA
- Petrovgrad
- Leningrad (disambiguation)
- Petersburg (disambiguation)
- Saint Petersburg (disambiguation)
