= Nichioh Maru =

History
- Name: Nichioh Maru
- Owner: Nissan Motors
- Operator: Nitto Kaiun Corporation
- Port of registry: Japan
- Route: Kanda–Oppama–Kobe
- Builder: Shin Kurushima Dockyard Co., Ltd
- Launched: January 2012
- Identification: IMO number: 9609184; Call sign: JD3267

General characteristics
- Type: Ro-ro car carrier
- Tonnage: 1,140 GT
- Length: 169.95 m (557 ft 7 in)
- Beam: 26 m (85 ft 4 in)
- Speed: 21.2 knots (39.3 km/h; 24.4 mph)
- Capacity: Completed vehicles: 880 units; (without truck trailers: 1,380 units; with trailers: 115 units)

Nichioh Maru is a ro-ro car carrier built for the transport of Nissan cars and parts around Japan. The ship employs various features designed to promote energy efficiency, including solar power panels, an electronically controlled diesel engine, LED lighting in the ship's hold and living quarters, and low friction paint on its hull. According to its owners it will achieve a fuel reduction of up to nearly 1,400 tons annually, with an annual reduction of 4,200 tons of CO_{2} emissions.

== See also ==
- City of St. Petersburg, Nissan's international car carrier
