= AN/M2 =

AN/M2 (also spelled as AN-M2) is a US military designation from the WW2 era that was used by multiple aircraft guns.

AN/M2 may refer to:

- .30 in (7.62 mm), AN/M2, a version of the M1919 Browning machine gun meant for aircraft use
- .50 in (12.7 mm), AN/M2, a version of the M2 Browning machine gun meant for aircraft use
- 20 mm AN/M2, a US variant of the Hispano-Suiza HS.404 autocannon meant for aircraft use
