= Treaty of Saint Petersburg =

Treaty of Saint Petersburg or Treaty of St. Petersburg may refer to:

- Treaty of Saint Petersburg (1723), concluded between the Persian Empire and the Russian Empire
- Treaty of Saint Petersburg (1755), Great Britain promises subsidies to the Russian Empire on the eve of the Seven Years' War
- Treaty of Saint Petersburg (1762), ending the Seven Years' War between Prussia and Russia following the accession of Tsar Peter III
- Treaty of Saint Petersburg (1805), signed by the British Empire and the Russian Empire to create an alliance against Napoleon's French Empire
- Treaty of Saint Petersburg (1812), an alliance between Russia and Sweden against the French Empire of Napoleon
- Treaty of Saint Petersburg (1825), defined the boundaries in the area that later became Alaska
- Treaty of Saint Petersburg (1826), a treaty between the United Kingdoms of Sweden and Norway and the Russian Empire
- Treaty of Saint Petersburg (1834), concluded between the Ottoman Porte and Russia
- St. Petersburg Declaration of 1868, a predecessor of the Hague Conventions of 1899 and 1907
- Treaty of Saint Petersburg (1875), a treaty between the Empire of Japan and Empire of Russia about disputed islands
- Treaty of Saint Petersburg (1881), a treaty between the Russian Empire and the Chinese Empire
- Anglo-Russian Entente (1907)

== See also ==
- Convention of St Petersburg (disambiguation)
- Saint Petersburg Declaration (disambiguation)
