= Saint Petersburg Declaration =

The Saint Petersburg Declaration may refer to:

- Saint Petersburg Declaration of 1868, a treaty prohibiting the use of less deadly explosives that might merely injure and thus create prolonged suffering of combatants
- Saint Petersburg Declaration on Forest Law Enforcement and Governance in Europe and North Asia (2005) - see Illegal logging

It may also refer to:

- St. Petersburg Declaration (St. Petersburg, Florida, 2007), a manifesto calling for reform within Islam - see Secular Islam Summit

== See also ==
- Convention of St Petersburg (disambiguation)
- Treaty of Saint Petersburg (disambiguation)
