= Peterborough station (disambiguation) =

Peterborough station may refer to:

== Railways ==
- Peterborough railway station, in England
- Peterborough East railway station, originally named 'Peterborough', a former station in England
- Peterborough railway station, South Australia, in Australia
- Peterborough station, Ontario, a heritage railway station in Canada

== Other ==
- Peterborough Power Station, a gas-fired power station in Peterborough, England
- Peterborough transmitting station, a broadcasting and telecommunications facility near Peterborough, England

== See also ==
- Peterborough (disambiguation)
