= Petersburg, Kentucky =

Petersburg is the name of two unincorporated areas in the U.S. state of Kentucky:

- Petersburg, Boone County, Kentucky, in Boone County, Kentucky
- Petersburg, Louisville, in the consolidated Louisville city-county government area
