= Convention of Saint Petersburg =

The Convention of Saint Petersburg may refer to several diplomatic agreements including

- Convention of Saint Petersburg (1747), treaty between Russia, Britain and the Dutch Republic during the War of the Austrian Succession
- Saint Petersburg Declaration of 1868, a convention renouncing the military use of explosive small-weapons projectiles
- Anglo-Russian Convention, treaty between Britain and Russia in 1907 agreeing not to annex Afghanistan

== See also ==
- Saint Petersburg Declaration (disambiguation)
- Treaty of Saint Petersburg (disambiguation)
