= Petersburg, North Carolina =

Petersburg, North Carolina may refer to:

- Petersburg, Burke County, North Carolina
- Petersburg, Madison County, North Carolina
- Petersburg, Onslow County, North Carolina
- Moravian Falls, North Carolina, formerly called Petersburg
