= MV City of St. Petersburg =

Car carrier ship

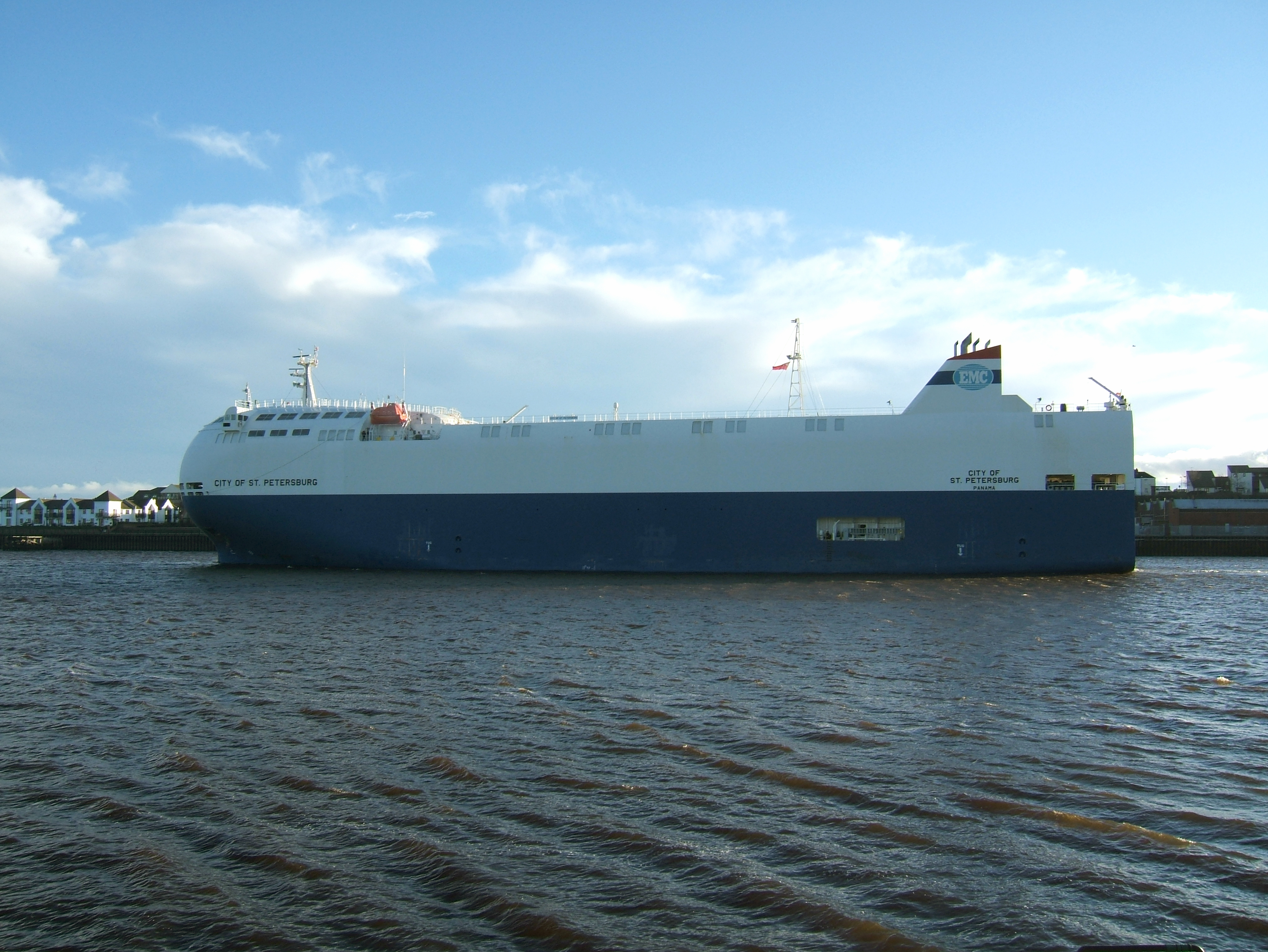
- City of St. Petersburg leaving Tyne

History
- Name: City of St Petersburg
- Owner: Fair Wind Navigation S.A.
- Port of registry: Panama
- Builder: Kyokuyo Shipyard Corporation
- Yard number: Shimonoseki 493
- Completed: 22 December 2010
- Identification: BV reg no: 13256L; Call sign: 3FIM5; IMO number: 9473456; MMSI number: 353083000
- Status: Operational

General characteristics
- Type: Car carrier
- Tonnage: 21,143 GT; 6,342 NT; 21,000 DWT
- Length: 139.99 m (459.3 ft)
- Beam: 22.4 m (73 ft)
- Draught: 6.5 m (21 ft)
- Depth: 24.45 m (80.2 ft)
- Decks: 12
- Deck clearance: 1,460 mm (57 in)
- Installed power: 7-cylinder two-stroke engine
- Propulsion: Single shaft
- Speed: 16.9 knots (31.3 km/h; 19.4 mph)
- Capacity: 2,000 vehicles

City of St. Petersburg is a roll-on/roll-off, pure car carrier cargo ship made for Nissan Motor Company Ltd, designed with a sleek semi-spherical prow to reduce wind resistance, thus saving 800 tons of fuel annually.

== See also ==
- Nichioh Maru, Nissan's domestic car carrier
