= Leningrad (disambiguation) =

Leningrad is a former name of St. Petersburg, Russia.

Leningrad may also refer to:

== Places ==
- Leningrad Oblast, a federal subject of Russia, around Saint Petersburg
- Mu'minobod, Tajikistan (former name)
- 2046 Leningrad, an asteroid named after Leningrad

== Music ==
- Leningrad (band), Russian ska/punk band
- Symphony No. 7 (Shostakovich) (Op. 60), a symphony by Shostakovich, subtitled Leningrad
- "Leningrad" (song), 1989 song by Billy Joel
- Leningrad, track 3 on The Storyman, 2006 album by Chris de Burgh
- Leningrad, track 6 on the Leningrad Cowboys album Go Space

== Ships ==
- Soviet helicopter carrier Leningrad, 1968 naval vessel
- Leningrad-class destroyer, Soviet Navy destroyers in service 1936–1963
  - Soviet destroyer Leningrad, the lead ship of the Leningrad class

== Other ==
- Leningrad, a ZX Spectrum clone
- Leningrad Military District, of the Russian Armed Forces
- Leningrad: The Advance of Army Group North, Summer 1941, a 1980 board wargame about the 1941 battle for the city

== See also ==
- List of places named after Vladimir Lenin
- Leningradsky (disambiguation)
- Petrograd (disambiguation)
