= Saint Peter's Abbey on the Madron =

Former monastery in Bavaria, Germany

Coordinates: 47°42′45″N 12°07′33″E

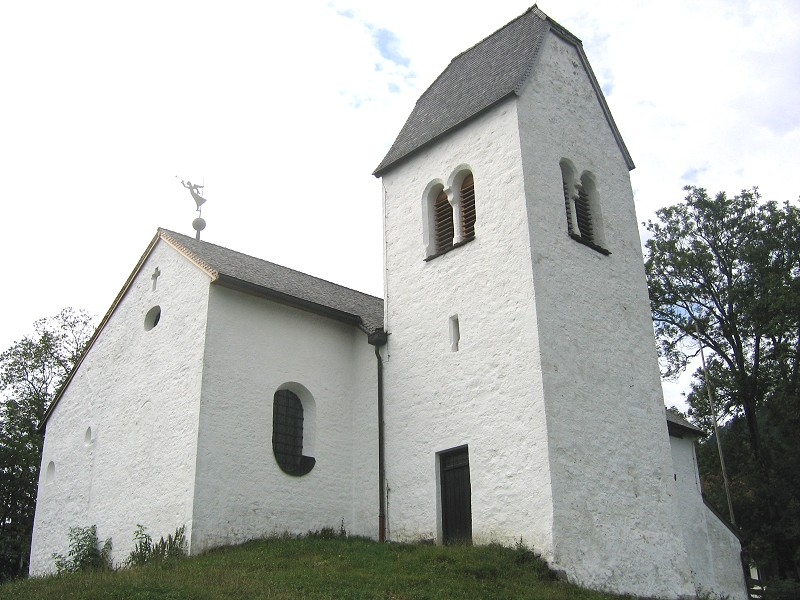
Peterskirchlein

St. Peter's Abbey on the Madron (Kloster St. Peter am Madron) was a Benedictine monastery in Flintsbach am Inn in Bavaria, Germany. The church, now a pilgrimage church known as the Peterskirchlein, still stands on the site.

== History ==
The Madron is a mountain known also as the Petersberg ("St. Peter's Mount"). It was occupied in ancient times, showing traces of Bronze Age settlement.

A poorly documented monastic foundation dating from sometime in the 8th century and settled by monks from St. Peter's Abbey in Salzburg was destroyed by the Hungarian invasion of the early 10th century. A supposed resettlement in about 955 by refugee monks from Wessobrunn Abbey is equally poorly evidenced.

In 1130 however the monastery, dedicated to Saint Peter, was definitely (re)founded by Count Siboto of Falkenstein and resettled by monks from Weihenstephan Abbey in Freising. The Counts of Falkenstein-Neuburg were also the monastery's Vögte (lords protector) and endowed it with a number of estates. They gave the monastery to the Bishop of Freising in 1163, but retained the office of Vogt. The monastery was destroyed in 1296 during a dynastic conflict, and never rebuilt. From the early 14th century, the site became a prebend for a canon of Freising Cathedral, part of whose responsibilities was to oversee the long-established pilgrimage here. It was dissolved in the secularisation of 1803.

The area for which the place had pastoral responsibility was extremely small, but against expectation, the church survived and became shortly afterward the centre of a renewed interest in the tradition of the pilgrimage. The Peterskirchlein is today a well-known landmark on its mountain.
