= Petersburg, Iowa =

Petersburg, Iowa may refer to:

- Petersburg, Delaware County, Iowa
- Petersburg, Muscatine County, Iowa
