= Petersberg (Flintsbach) =

Mountain in Bavaria, Germany

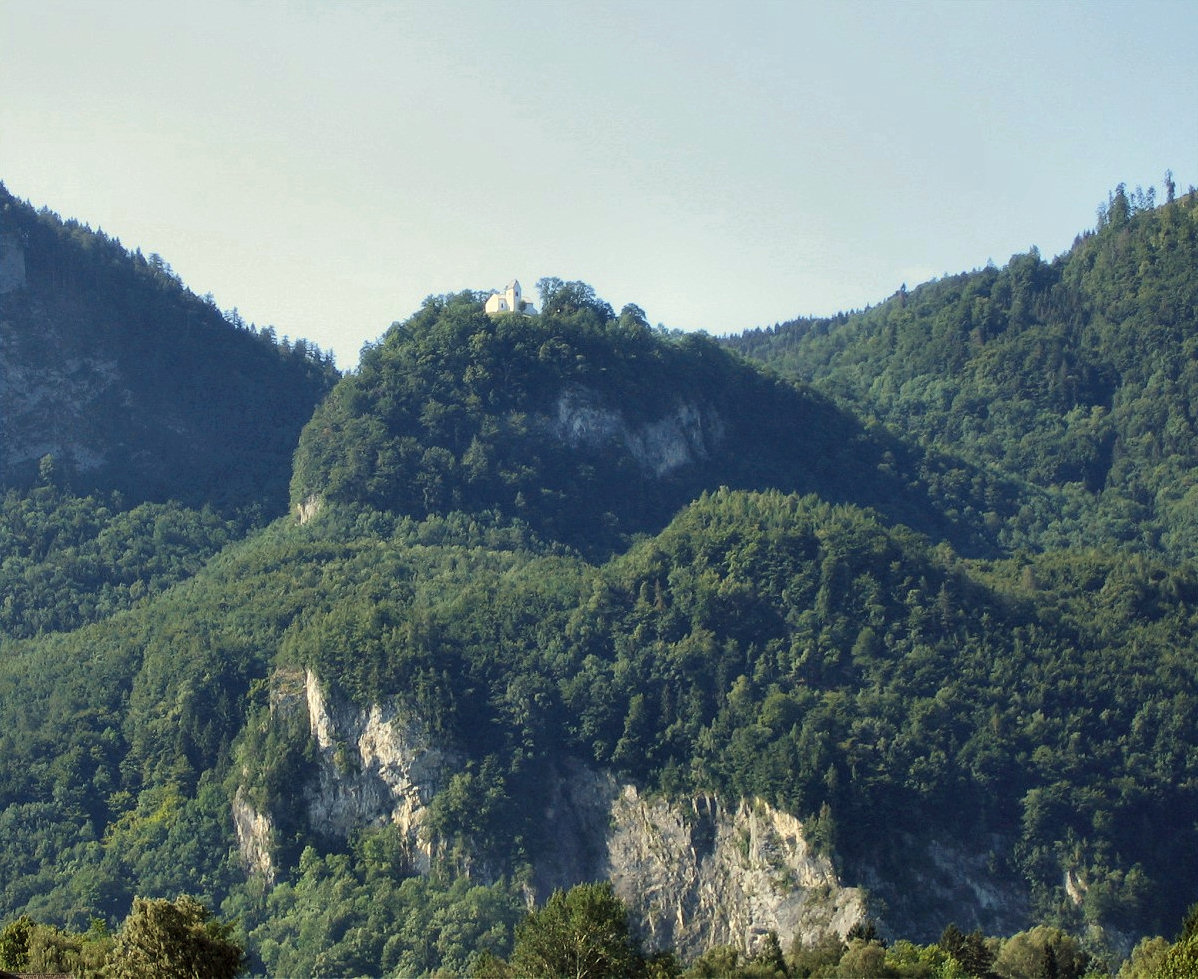
- Petersberg in June 2007

Highest point
- Elevation: 847 m (2,779 ft)
- Coordinates: 47°42′45″N 12°07′33″E

Geography
- Location within Bavaria
- Location: Bavaria, Germany
- Parent range: Mangfall Mountains

Petersberg (German pronunciation: [ˈpeːtɐsˌbɛʁk]) is a mountain in the Flintsbach municipality of Bavaria, Germany. Situated in the eastern foothills of the Mangfall Mountains, some 400 meters above the Inn valley, it is noteworthy for its (short-lived) medieval monastery of Saint Peter's on the Madron, the church of which however retained its importance as a pilgrimage site.
