= Petersburg, Ohio =

Petersburg, Ohio may refer to:

- Petersburg, Carroll County, Ohio
- Petersburg, Jackson County, Ohio
- Petersburg, Mahoning County, Ohio
- Coal Grove, Ohio, also called "Petersburg"
