= Peterborough (disambiguation) =

Peterborough is a city in the county of Cambridgeshire, England, formerly in Northamptonshire.

Peterborough may also refer to:

== Australia ==
- Peterborough, South Australia
- District Council of Peterborough, South Australia
- Peterborough, Victoria
- Shellharbour, New South Wales was once known as Peterborough

== Canada ==
- Peterborough (electoral district), Ontario
- Peterborough (provincial electoral district), Ontario
- Peterborough, Ontario
- Peterborough County, Ontario

== England ==
- Peterborough (UK Parliament constituency), Cambridgeshire
- City of Peterborough, a district of Cambridgeshire
- Peterborough Rural District, a former district of England
- Soke of Peterborough, a historic area in England

== United States ==
- Peterborough, New Hampshire, a New England town
  - Peterborough (CDP), New Hampshire, the main village in the town

== Other uses ==
- Peterborough (HM Prison), in Peterborough, England
- Peterborough United F.C., a football team in the English Championship
- HMCS Peterborough, 1944 Royal Canadian Navy corvette
- BR Standard Class 5 73050, a preserved British steam locomotive

== See also ==
- Peterborough station (disambiguation)
- Peterboro, New York
- Petersburg (disambiguation), several places
