= Petersburg, Louisville =

Neighborhood in Louisville, Kentucky

Coordinates: 38°11′02″N 85°39′57″W

Petersburg is a neighborhood of Louisville, Kentucky centered along Petersburg Road and Indian Trail.

The area is named after freedman Peter Laws who constructed a log cabin in the area after the Civil War. The Petersburg-Newburg area is home to one of the area's oldest black cemeteries.
