= Saint Petersburg Declaration of 1868 =

International treaty agreed in Saint Petersburg

- Type: Multilateral treaty
- Signed: 11 December 1868
- Location: Saint Petersburg, Russia

The Saint Petersburg Declaration of 1868 is an international treaty that outlawed the use of exploding bullets by the 17 signatory states. The signatories reasoned that that bullets that either blew up or caught fire upon hitting a target were too lethal, making the practice uncivilized and barbaric. The treaty is considered foundational to international humanitarian law. The treaty only applied to warfare between the signatories and excluded use of exploding bullets in colonial warfare and police actions.

The treaty, also known in full as the Declaration Renouncing the Use, in Time of War, of Explosive Projectiles Under 400 Grammes Weight, was agreed in Saint Petersburg, Russian Empire, 11 December [O.S. 29 November] 1868. It succeeded the First Geneva Convention of 1864. It was a predecessor of the well-known Hague Conventions of 1899 and 1907. It was signed by the members of the International Military Commission convened for this purpose in the presence of the Imperial Cabinet of Russia.

== History ==
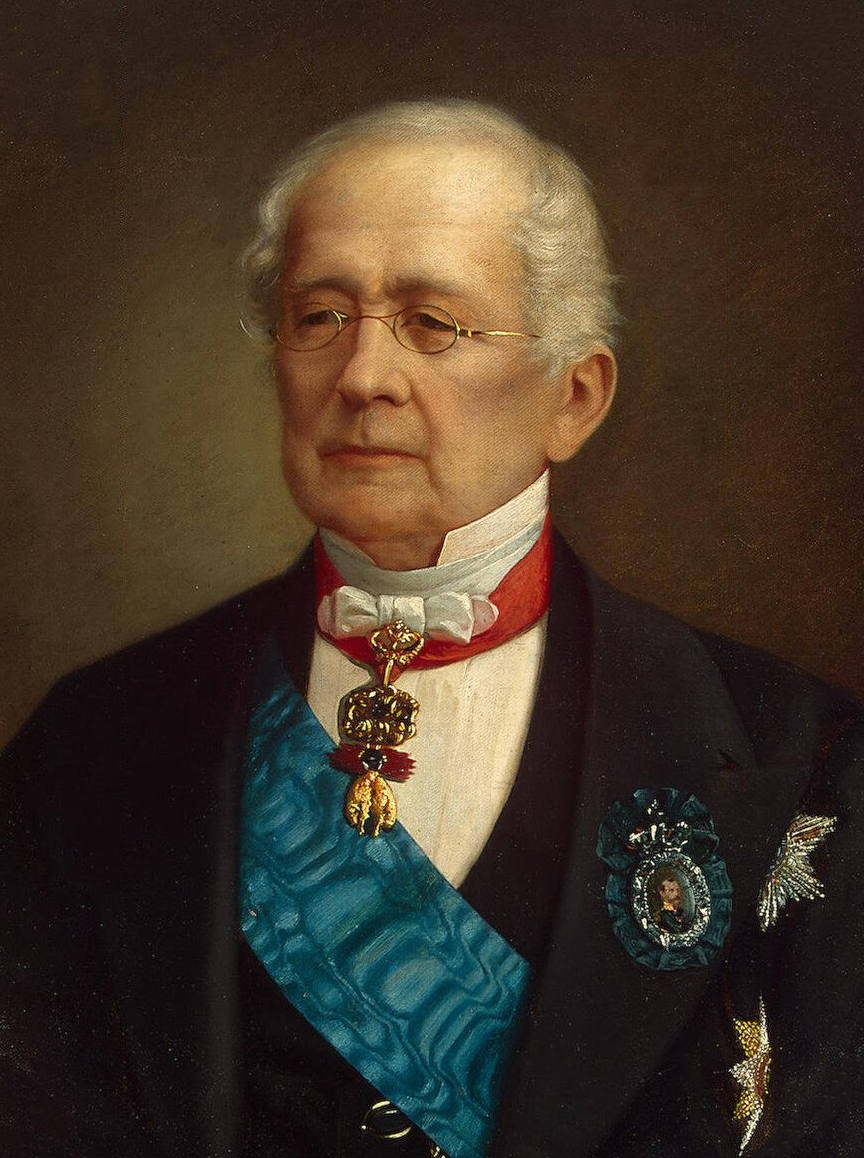
Alexander Gorchakov

In 1863, the Russian Army had perfected a fulminating musketball that could explode when it hit a hard target and was designed to blow up powder magazines or ammunition wagons. At the same time several similar projectiles for the same purposes were developed in America, the best one known being the Gardiner's Explosive Bullet, and both sides used them in the US Civil War, inflicting horrible wounds when aimed at people, and that, in turn, caused a public backlash against the weapon. In 1867, Russians perfected an improved explosive musketball that would detonate on any impact after being fired, even soft targets like people or animals. Predicting the disastrous effect of such a discovery on diplomatic relations with their neighbors, Russia decided to negotiate a ban on the development, creation, and use of such weapons before a grisly arms race commenced.

Upon the invitation of the Russian diplomat and statesman Prince Alexander Gorchakov, for the purpose of considering the existing rules of war, a conference of delegates met at Saint Petersburg, Russian Empire, in December 1868.

The nations represented were Austria-Hungary, Bavaria, Belgium, Denmark, France, United Kingdom (representing the British Empire), Greece, Italy, the Netherlands, Persia, Portugal, Prussia and the North German Confederation (i.e., Greater Prussia), Russia, Sweden-Norway, Switzerland, the Ottoman Empire, and Württemberg. The United States, not considered a major power at the time, was not invited and took no part in the convention. Baden and Brazil ratified the agreement in 1869.

The delegates affirmed that the only legitimate object of war should be to weaken the military force of the enemy, which could be sufficiently accomplished by the employment of highly destructive weapons. With that fact established, the delegates agreed to prohibit the use of less deadly explosives that might merely injure the combatants and thereby create prolonged suffering of such combatants.

The Great Powers agreed to renounce, in case of war among themselves, the use "by their military or naval troops of any projectile of a weight below 400 grams (14 ounces avoirdupois), which is either explosive or charged with fulminating or inflammable substances."

While the declaration bans the use of fragmenting, explosive, or incendiary small arms ammunition, it does not prohibit such ammunition for use in autocannon or artillery rounds.

The influence of this declaration on international humanitarian law were elucidated in the Japanese case Ryuichi Shimoda v. The State (1963):

International law of war is not formulated simply on the basis of humanitarian feelings. It has as its basis both considerations of military necessity and effectiveness and humanitarian considerations, and is formulated on a balance of these two factors. To illustrate this, an example often cited in the textbooks may be given, of the provisions of the St. Petersburg Declaration of 1868 prohibiting the use of projectiles under 400 grammes which are either explosive or charged with combustible or inflammable substances. The reason for the prohibition is explained as follows: such projectiles are small and just powerful enough to kill or wound only one man, and as an ordinary bullet will do for this purpose, there is no overriding need for using these inhuman weapons. On the other hand, the use of a certain weapon, great as its inhuman result may be, need not be prohibited by international law if it has a great military effect.

== Notes ==
- Ammunition for anti-materiel rifles and heavy machine guns with a bore of about 12.7 mm to 14.5 mm in diameter straddle the definition between small arms and heavy weapons. Large-bore rifles using high-explosive or incendiary rounds run the risk of violating the Declaration despite the legal use (as specified in the Hague Conventions of 1899 and 1907) of such special munitions in heavy machine guns and autocannons. The discussion of their legality often revolves around the weight limitation and whether it applies to the weight of the bullet itself or to the entire fixed cartridge.
- The distinction between "explosive" and "fulminating" bullets is academic but important.
  - An "explosive" bullet contains an explosive filler that detonates on impact.
  - A "fulminating" bullet contains a small unstable high explosive charge and is designed to shatter into fragments after impact or inside the wound. They also have the added potential of detonating when jarred or while being removed, complicating first aid or surgery.
- The Declaration bans such munitions during wars only among the co-signatory European and Eurasian nations. It notably leaves out instances of war with non-signatory nations, conflicts with undeveloped nations, or military operations in their own colonies and possessions.
