= George S. Bowdoin Stable =

Former stable in Manhattan, New York

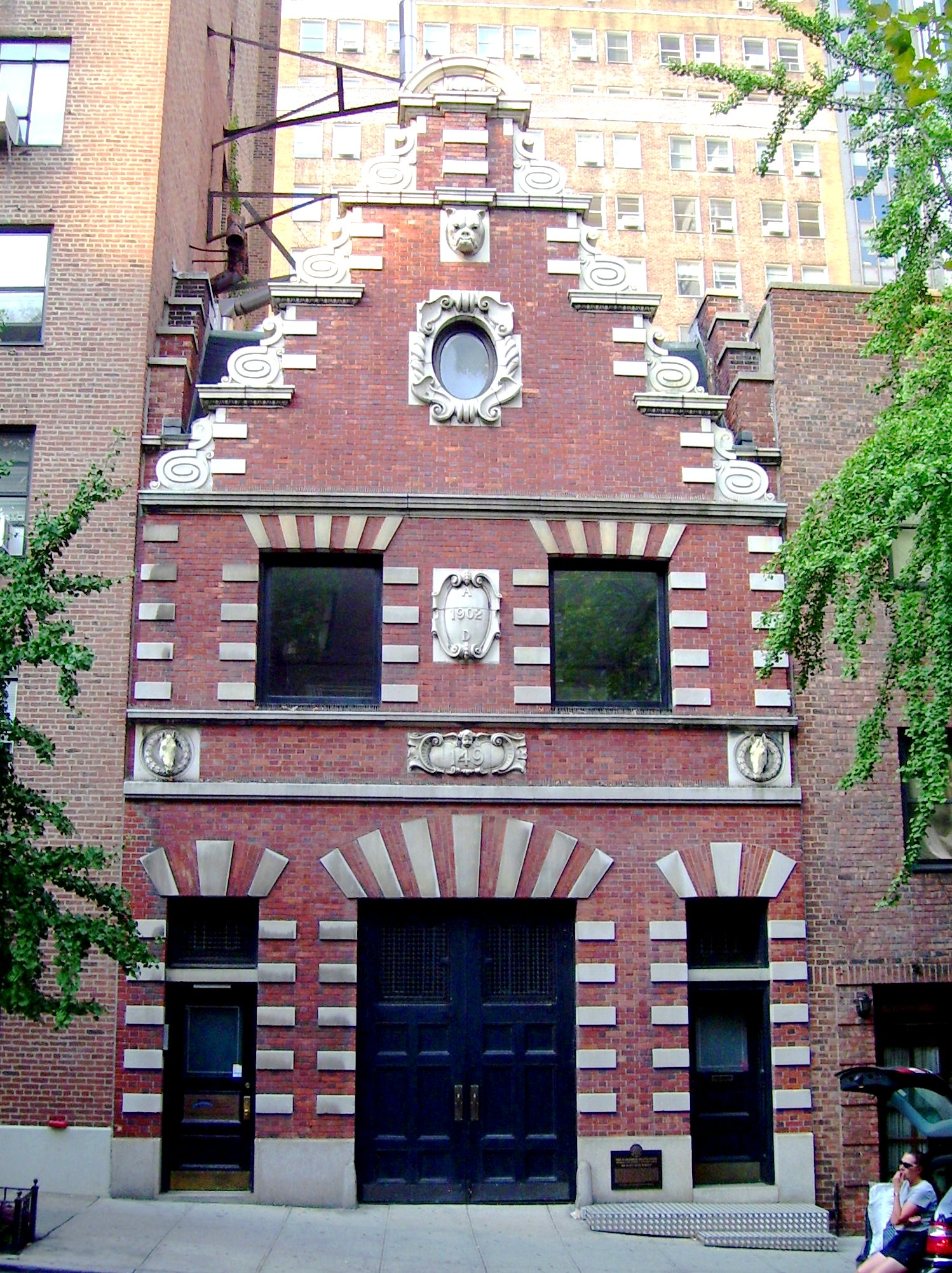
- George S. Bowdoin Stable in 2012
- Interactive map of the George S. Bowdoin Stable area

General information
- Architectural style: Dutch Revival
- Location: 149 East 38th Street; New York City, US
- Coordinates: 40°44′55.5″N 73°58′36.5″W
- Completed: 1902

Design and construction
- Architect: Ralph S. Townsend
- Main contractor: Isaac Hopper & Son

New York City Landmark
- Designated: June 17, 1997
- Reference no.: 1953

The George S. Bowdoin Stable is a historic building located at 149 East 38th Street between Lexington and Third avenues in the Murray Hill neighborhood of Manhattan in New York City. Designed by Ralph S. Townsend, the structure was originally constructed in 1902 as a private horse stable for William R. H. Martin. Over the years, it has accommodated a variety of other uses, including a garage, private residence, art gallery, cultural center, and office.

The structure's two-and-a-half-story-tall façade is made of red brick and stone. The façade is decorated with stone quoins, horses' heads, and bulldog motifs. The interior was originally divided into stables on the first floor and coachmen's quarters on the second floor. Over the years, the interior has been modified into a two-and-a-half bedroom house with design features such as high ceilings and skylights.

== History ==
The property, which previously contained a four-story dwelling, was purchased by William R. H. Martin from John W. Smyth in 1902 for the purposes of erecting a private stable on the lot. Martin resided at 114 East 36th Street in Murray Hill and was a senior partner at the men's clothing firm of Rogers, Peet & Company. He also was one of the largest real estate holders in Manhattan; some of the properties he owned included the Martinique Hotel and the Marbridge Building. When the building was constructed at the beginning of the 20th century, stables were often situated a block or more away from prime residential districts to keep the noises and smells from the horses away from wealthy residents. The site selected for the stable between Lexington and Third avenues was located just outside of the Murray Hill neighborhood (which ran from East 35th to 40th streets between Madison and Lexington avenues) and avoided the higher real estate costs to the west near Fifth Avenue.

=== 20th century ===
Plans for the stable were filed in August 1902, and it was constructed the same year. Ralph S. Townsend, who designed the stable, also designed a house at 122–124 East 38th Street for Martin. In 1907, Martin sold the property to George S. Bowdoin, a partner at J.P. Morgan & Co. Like Martin, Bowdoin was a Murray Hill resident and lived on Park Avenue near East 36th Street. His daughter Edith inherited the stable after his death in 1913 and had the first floor converted into a garage for automobiles in 1918. That December, John H. Duncan completed plans for $3,000 worth of alterations; the modifications included new floors and fireproof partitions, as well as removal of old stalls.

After Edith Grinnell Bowdoin's death in 1943, the stable was sold in January 1944. The buyer was George Nichols, who kept four of his vehicles in the garage and rented out the upper floors as a single-family residence.

The 6,000-square-foot (560 m^{2}) building was gutted and renovated by a new owner in 1984, who installed numerous skylights and opened up the interior space to provide ceilings over 20 feet (6.1 m) tall, but ended up never living in the building because they got married and moved to California. The newly renovated home was rented out to Jane Nichols Page, the granddaughter of John Pierpont Morgan Jr. The property was purchased by Donald Saff and his wife Ruth in 1997, who paid "in the high $2 millions" and spent six weeks renovating it. The Saffs used the building as an art gallery, office and residence. That year, the former stable was designated as a landmark by the New York City Landmarks Preservation Commission.

=== 21st century ===
By the early 2000s, there was a 700-square-foot (65 m^{2}) rooftop farm above the carriage house. In 2002, the building became the home of the Gabarron Foundation's Carriage House Center for the Arts, a non-profit organization that promotes the understanding of Spanish culture in the United States. They hosted artworks and presented activities within the house. The Gabarron Foundation bought the townhouse from lawyer Theodore W. Kheel's Task Foundation in 2005 at a cost of $5 million. The Gabarron Foundation placed the building for sale in 2011 with an asking price of $13.995 million, but the sale price was reduced multiple times to $8.25 million in 2012.

Following a renovation in 2015, the structure was placed for sale the next year with an asking price of $8.35 million. Since 2017, the building has served as the headquarters of the Henry George School of Social Science. It is one of the few surviving buildings in Manhattan that were used as stables.

== Architecture ==
The stable was designed by architect Ralph S. Townsend in the Dutch Revival style. Townsend and his firm—Townsend, Steinle & Haskell—later had several other commissions for Martin, including the Marbridge Building. The stable's design includes motifs of bulldogs and horse heads, indicating the building's original use.

=== Exterior ===
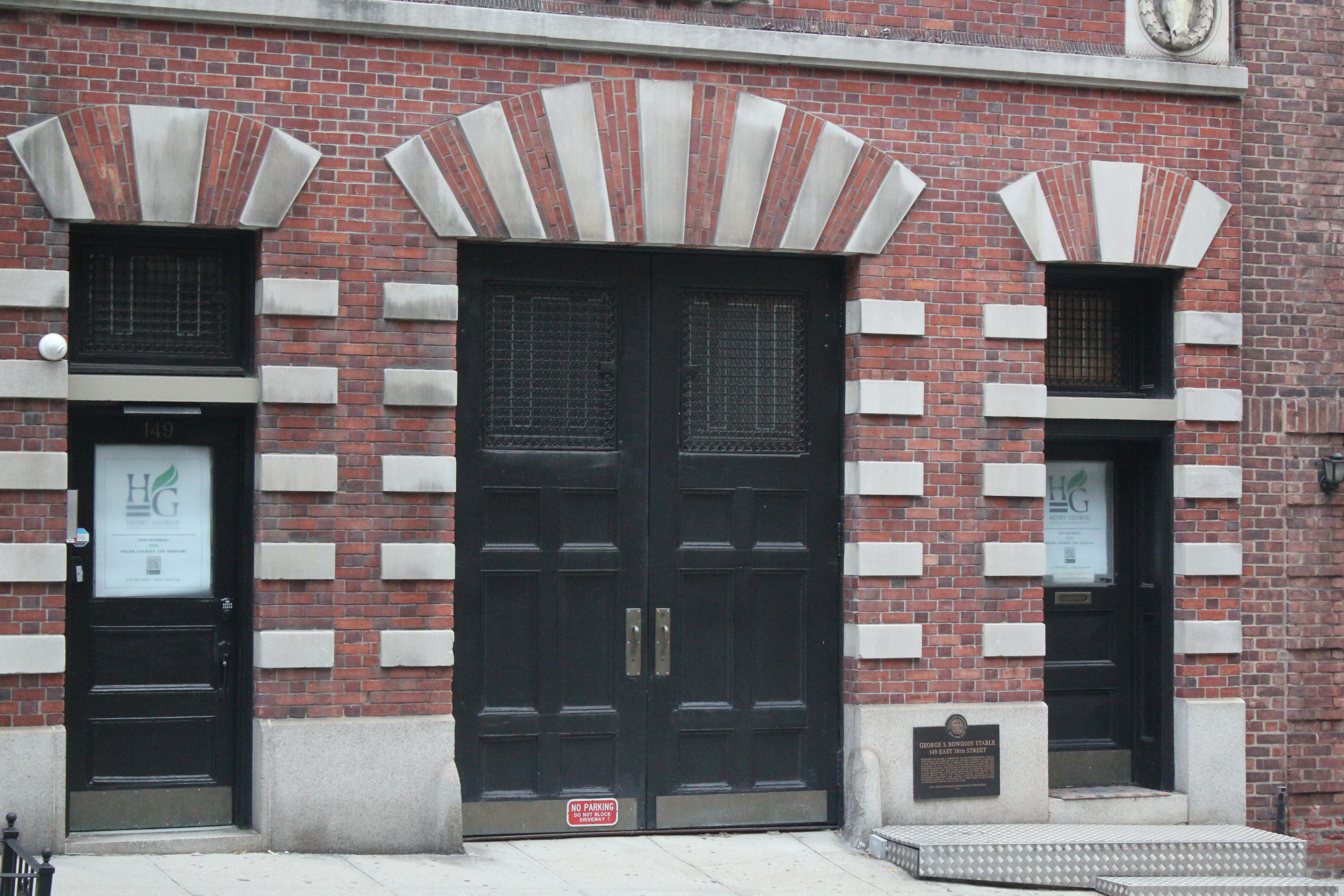
Ground-level doorways

The façade is made of brick and is two and a half stories high. At ground level, the façade is divided into three bays of doorways. The center bay features double doors and was originally the carriage entrance, while the outer bays are narrower doorways. The westernmost opening was originally a window but was converted into a doorway at some point in the 20th century; both of the outer doorways contain a wooden door below a rectangular transom window. All three openings are arched and are topped by stone-and-brick voussoirs and stone quoins. There is a horizontal band course of stone above the first story, as well as a stone window sill just below the second story. A pair of high-relief horse heads are mounted above the first floor band course on either end of the façade. Between the horse heads, just above the main doorway, is a stone escutcheon with the building's house number, 149.

There are two rectangular sash windows on the second story, connected by the stone windowsill. Each window is flanked by stone quoins, and there are additional quoins on the outermost parts of the façade. Another stone escutcheon between the two windows contains the inscription "A.D.1902" indicating the building's year of construction. A band course runs above the second story. There is a stepped gable with a high-relief of a bulldog and a bull's eye window on the third story. The gable is clad in red Flemish bond brickwork, with large white stone quoins and volutes on either side of the gable. A stone pediment caps the gable.

=== Interior ===
The stable contained living quarters for the coachmen above the horse stalls and the carriages that were kept on the ground floor. By the 21st century, the building had 6,000 square feet (560 m^{2}) or 7,406 square feet (688.0 m^{2}) of space across three floors.

The building has two and a half bedrooms, a terrace, kitchen, bookshelves, and wooden fireplaces. The first floor has wooden floors, while the second story has porcelain-tiled floor. The ceilings range up to 25 feet (7.6 m), and there is a spiral staircase connecting the first through third floors. When the Saffs lived in the building, it included practical design features such as glass brick walls and skylights. There were also custom design features including a box that remotely controlled the light, music, and curtains in the master bedroom, as well as neon pink lights in the kitchen's pillars. Saff referred to the box as a "James Bond" novelty and the lights as a "Miami Vice" feature. The Gabarron Foundation used the first two floors for exhibits and the third story for office space.

== In popular culture ==
The building was used as a filming location in Woody Allen's 2009 comedy movie Whatever Works.

== See also ==
- List of New York City Designated Landmarks in Manhattan from 14th to 59th Streets
