= Martinique New York on Broadway, Curio Collection by Hilton =

Hotel in Manhattan, New York

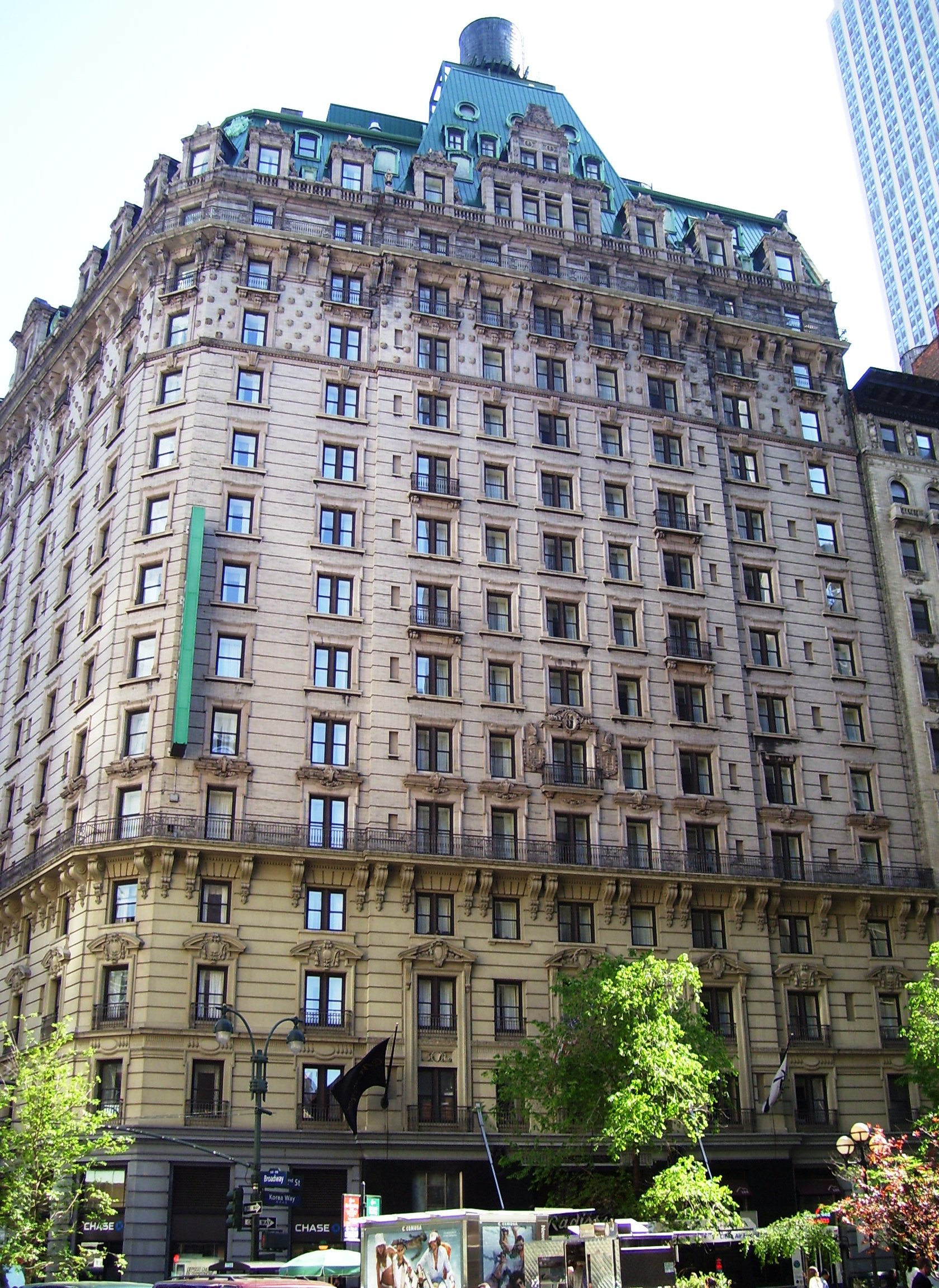
- Martinique New York on Broadway, south facade

General information
- Architectural style: French Renaissance
- Location: 49 West 32nd Street (1260–1266 Broadway), Manhattan, New York, United States
- Coordinates: 40°44′54″N 73°59′16″W
- Construction started: 1897
- Opening: 1898
- Operator: Hilton Hotels

Height
- Height: 200 feet (61 m)

Technical details
- Floor count: 19

Design and construction
- Architect: Henry Janeway Hardenbergh

Other information
- Number of rooms: 531
- Number of restaurants: 2

Website
- Official website

U.S. National Register of Historic Places
- Designated: January 30, 2025
- Reference no.: 100011342

New York State Register of Historic Places
- Designated: December 5, 2024
- Reference no.: 06101.015753

New York City Landmark
- Designated: May 5, 1998
- Reference no.: 1983

The Martinique New York on Broadway, Curio Collection by Hilton is a 532-room hotel at 53 West 32nd Street (also known as 1260–1266 Broadway) in Manhattan, New York City, United States. It was designed by Henry Janeway Hardenbergh and built by William R. H. Martin, who headed the Rogers Peet business, in a French Renaissance style. The Martinique was developed in three sections between 1897 and 1910. The hotel is a New York City designated landmark, is listed on the National Register of Historic Places, and is part of the Historic Hotels of America.

As completed, the hotel had 600 rooms. The hotel occupies an irregular site with facades along Broadway to the west, 33rd Street to the north, and 32nd Street to the south. On all three sides, the facade is made of glazed brick, terracotta, and limestone, with balconies, cartouches, and sash windows. It is crowned by a large green mansard roof and has decorated dormer windows. Inside the hotel were various ornately decorated public rooms, including a lobby, cafe, and dining rooms at ground level; a grill room in the basement; and ballrooms on the second floor. The modern-day hotel contains two restaurants and some exhibition space.

Martin acquired land for the hotel between 1892 and 1895. The first section of the hotel on 33rd Street opened in 1898 and originally operated as an apartment hotel. The Martinique was expanded twice, in 1901–1903 and 1909–1910. Martin sold the hotel in 1919 to T. Coleman du Pont of the Greeley Square Company. Louis Markel's 56 East 59th Street Corporation acquired the hotel in 1929 and lost it to foreclosure two years later. Frank W. Kridel operated the hotel from 1939 to 1954, when he sold the building to Robert Selby and Eugene Moses. From 1973 until the end of 1988, the Martinique was a welfare hotel housing hundreds of families. The welfare hotel gained a negative reputation across the U.S. and was the setting for Jonathan Kozol's 1988 study, Rachel and Her Children: Homeless Families in America. Developer Harold Thurman leased the building from the owners in 1989, and he reopened it under a Holiday Inn franchise in October 1998. The hotel switched to the Radisson chain in 2005 and joined Hilton's Curio Collection division in 2019. After the Martinique went into foreclosure in 2020, Burnett Equities bought the hotel and reopened it in late 2021.

== Site ==
The Martinique New York is on the eastern side of Greeley Square, south of Herald Square, in the Koreatown and Midtown South neighborhoods of Manhattan in New York City, United States. The building has a frontage along Broadway to the west, 33rd Street to the north, and 32nd Street to the south. The hotel was built on lots at West 33rd and 32nd Streets, and also the northeast corner of Broadway and 32nd Street. The irregularly shaped land lot covers 19,975 square feet (1,855.7 m^{2}), with a frontage of 93.17 feet (28 m) on Broadway and a depth of 122.83 feet (37.44 m) between 33rd and 34th Streets. The property is identified on the Manhattan tax map as Block 834, Lot 11. The hotel comprises two 17-story structures on Broadway and 32nd Street, as well as a six-story wing on 33rd Street.

The building shares the city block with the Hotel Pierrepont and the Hotel at Fifth Avenue (the former Aberdeen Hotel) to the east. Other nearby structures include the Empire State Building to the northeast, Herald Towers to the north, Macy's Herald Square to the northwest, Manhattan Mall to the west, and the former Grand Hotel and the Hotel Wolcott one block south. There were once several department stores to the west, while there are office and hotel buildings to the east. To the south are other former hotels including the Gilsey House and Grand Hotel. The 12-story, 165-room Hotel Alcazar at one time adjoined the Hotel Martinique on the north side of 34th Street, east of Broadway. The Martinique also wrapped around a 20-story hotel at the southeast corner of Broadway and 33rd Street. An entrance to the New York City Subway's 34th Street–Herald Square station and to the PATH system's adjacent 33rd Street station is directly outside the hotel, within Greeley Square.

== Architecture ==
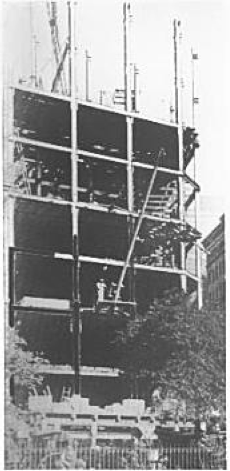
Construction work at the Hotel Martinique, circa 1910

Henry Janeway Hardenbergh designed the Martinique Hotel in the French Renaissance style. The hotel is variously described as being 16, 17, or 19 stories high. The design "capitalized on the openness of Greeley Square". A 1918 publication stated: "New York is noted for its beautiful buildings, and the Martinique is no exception". The building is a New York City designated landmark and is also part of the Historic Hotels of America. It was listed on the National Register of Historic Places in 2025.

The hotel was constructed in three sections. The original building on 33rd Street was erected in 1897–1898, followed by an extension to the middle of the Broadway frontage erected in 1901–1903. The section at the corner of 32nd Street and Broadway, including the entire 32nd Street frontage, was erected in 1909–1910. The original hotel measures 68 feet (21 m) wide, while the annex on Broadway measures 39 feet (12 m) wide. The 1910 annex's interior is of French Renaissance design, while its exterior uses a mix of French Renaissance and Spanish details. The addition and the older structure are connected with a large courtyard between the two buildings, forming an angle at this point.

=== Facade ===
The facade is clad with glazed brick, terracotta, and limestone. The 32nd Street elevation of the facade is divided vertically into nine bays, while the Broadway elevation is six bays wide and the 33rd Street elevation is five bays wide. The 32nd Street and 33rd Street elevations are symmetrical, and the Broadway elevation is asymmetrical. The eastern elevation, which faces nearby buildings, is clad with plain brick.

On all three elevations, the articulation consists of three horizontal sections similar to the components of a column (namely a base, shaft, and capital). These sections are separated from each other by a cornice above the fourth story and a string course above the eleventh story. The ground story is clad with rusticated limestone blocks and contains storefronts, while the upper stories are faced in terracotta and brick. The facade also contains aluminum sash windows. When built, the hotel featured "rusticated stonework balconies and prominent cartouches on all three of its facades". The facade is crowned by a two-story, green mansard roof with elaborate dormer windows. There are brick parapets and chimneys above the mansard roof. The chimneys have terracotta caps, and the main chimney on the 33rd Street wing also has a cupola and a cornice of sheet metal. In addition, the eastern part of the roof has a bulkhead or dormer structure for utilities.

==== 32nd Street elevation ====
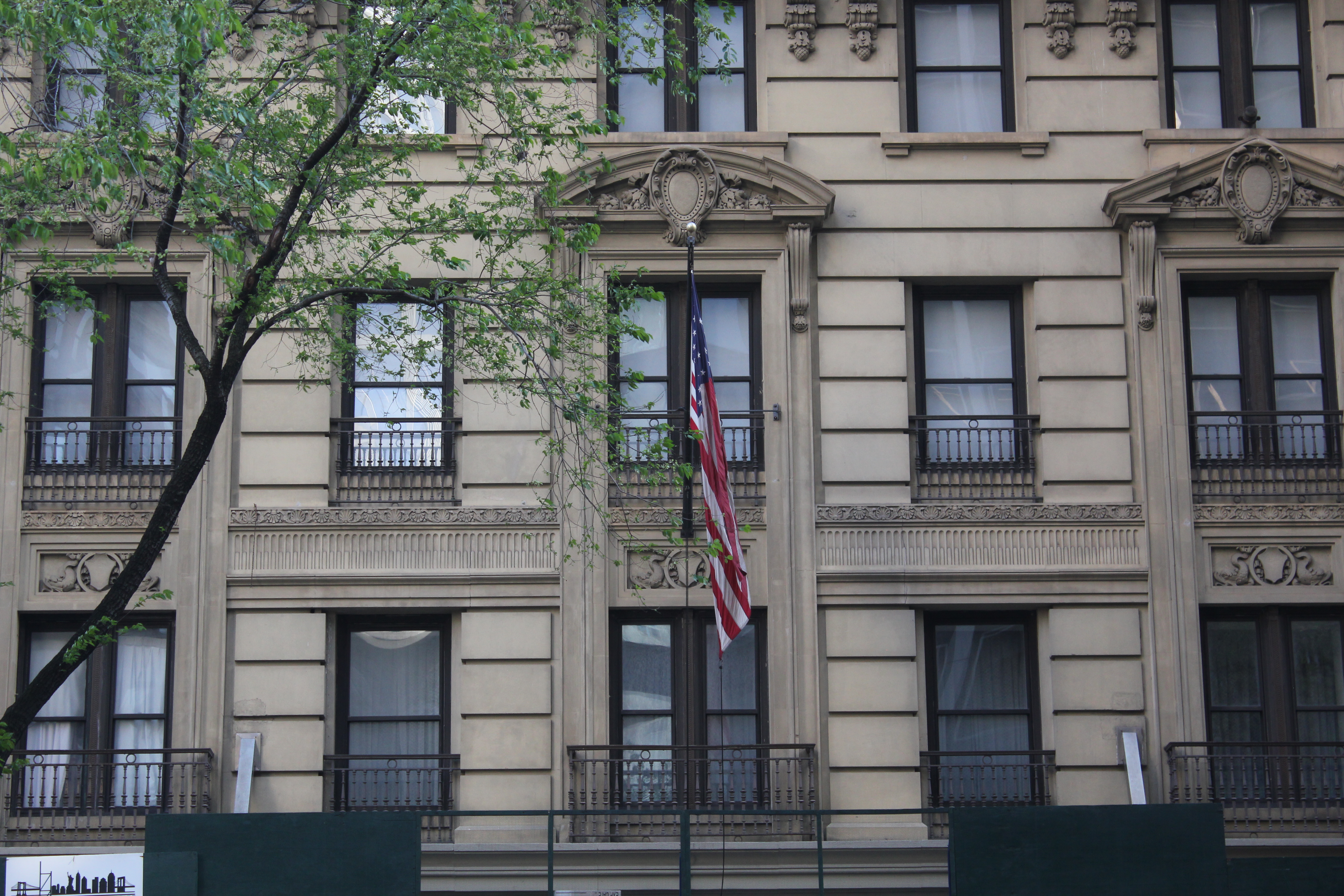
The second and third stories of the 32nd Street elevation's central pavilion. Three of the central pavilion's five bays are decorated, while the other two bays are plain in design.

The southern elevation on 32nd Street is the building's primary facade and dates to the 1910 expansion. This elevation is laid out symmetrically, and the five central bays are placed within a slightly projecting pavilion. The main entrance is on 32nd Street, through a three-bay-wide marble doorway at the center of the ground level, which is topped by a projecting marquee. A set of transom windows is placed above the main doors. Directly above the marquee is a frieze with the name "Hotel Martinique", as well as an escutcheon on either side of the frieze. The outermost ground-level bays contain windows or doors, which lead to storefronts. By the 2020s, the hotel entrance and one storefront had a cast-iron surround; some of the other storefronts have granite panels below their windows.

The second through fourth stories contain a rusticated stone facade with nine windows on each story. Each of the windows contains an iron railing in front of it. In three of the central pavilion's five bays, (Note: These would be the third, fifth, and seventh bays as counted from west to east.) the windows on the second and third stories are separated horizontally by decorative spandrel panels and flanked by vertical moldings, and there are broken pediments and crests above the third-story windows. The other two bays of the central pavilion are plainly decorated, and a molded frieze runs above the second-story windows. In the four outermost bays, (Note: These would be the first, second, eighth, and ninth bays from west to east.) the second-story windows are topped by geometric lintels, while those on the third story are topped by broken pediments and crests. The window sills on the fourth story are placed directly above the third-story windows' pediments. Above all of the fourth-story windows are voussoirs, which are flanked by brackets that support a balcony on the fifth story. The balcony itself contains a cast-iron balustrade.

The shaft consists of the fifth through eleventh stories and is clad with ivory-colored brick and terracotta, which is rusticated in a manner emulating the limestone below. The fifth-story windows contain volutes above them, and their sills rest atop the fourth-story cornice. The central sixth-story window is ornately decorated with escutcheons (also described as shields) and a pediment. Some of the eighth- and tenth-story windows contain balconettes. A Greek key molding runs above the eleventh story. The rest of the windows contain plain sills and are surrounded by eared terracotta frames.

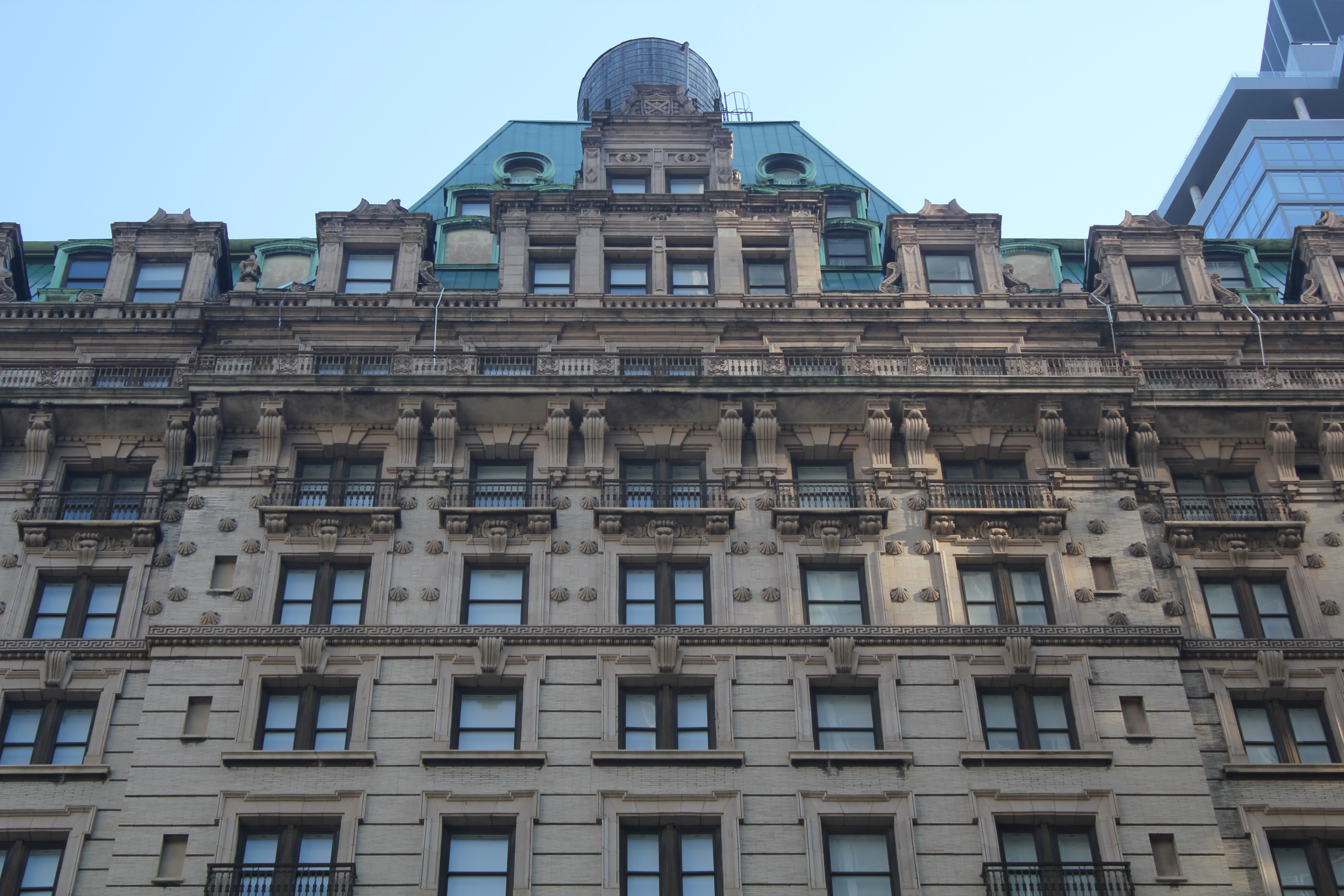
The tenth to sixteenth stories seen from 32nd Street. There is a band course above the eleventh story and a heavy cornice above the thirteenth story. The top stories are within a mansard roof and have dormer windows.

There are terracotta shells or scallops flanking the windows on the twelfth and thirteenth stories; the bricks on these stories are laid in a diaper pattern. The windows on the thirteenth story contain balconettes and sills with volutes below them. Above the thirteenth-story windows are splayed brick lintels and keystones. Large brackets between the thirteenth-story windows support a balcony on the fourteenth story. The windows on the fourteenth story are plain in design and are topped by a cornice with a stone balcony. The fifteenth story is within the mansard roof and contains projecting dormer windows, which are flanked by volutes and topped by finials. The central dormers have pointed, curved pediments, and there are smaller, rectangular dormers flanking these; in addition, the sixteenth-story windows have segmental-arched dormers. The center section of the mansard contains a square tower, which rises above the roof and supports a water tank. This square tower has segmental-arched dormers on the seventeenth story and oculi on the eighteenth story.

==== Broadway elevation ====
At the corner of Broadway and 32nd Street is a one-bay-wide chamfered corner, which separates the Broadway and 32nd Street elevations. The three southern bays on Broadway were built as part of the 1910 expansion and are spaced widely, similar to the 32nd Street elevation. The three northern bays, constructed as part of the 1903 expansion, are more narrowly spaced and slightly project from the facade. The ground level contains storefronts and windows.

The rest of the Broadway elevation is designed in a very similar manner to the outer bays of the 32nd Street elevation. On the sixth story, the center window of the northern section (Note: This would be the fifth bay as counted from south to north.) is flanked by a pair of escutcheons or shields. The fifteenth-story dormers in the northern three bays have curved pediments. Within the southern three bays, the fifteenth-story dormers have pointed curved or rectangular pediments, while the sixteenth-story dormers are segmentally arched. In addition, the roof is slightly asymmetrical, with a square tower rising from the northern section. At the corner with 32nd Street, there is a copper cartouche at the top of the facade.

==== 33rd Street elevation ====
The 33rd Street elevation is part of the original hotel and contains many of the same decorative elements as the later 32nd Street and Broadway elevations. The ground level has been converted to storefronts. The stucco facade, doors, and windows at this story date from 2009. The remaining stories have the same design as on the other elevations. The center three bays project slightly from the facade. The window openings in the central bay are wider than in the other bays, although the center bay's windows have been sealed up. The central sixth-story opening contains a balconette, as well as a large entablature above it, decorated with an escutcheon or shield and cornucopia. The second, fourth, eighth, and tenth stories also contain balconettes. Above the mansard roof is a central tower with a dormer, which in turn is flanked by a pair of smaller dormer windows. The central dormer's pediments are curved, while the smaller dormers have pediments with gables.

=== Interior ===
The hotel's public rooms are on the ground (first) floor, mezzanine, and second floor, while the guest rooms are above it. There are two basement levels, which include both public rooms and service spaces. The Martinique Hotel has two banks of elevators, one each to the north and south, in addition to several stairs. The bronze elevator doors have ornate decorations. The stairways are clustered around the center of the 33rd Street wing and the center of the 32nd Street wing's southern end. The southern bank of elevators has three shafts and adjoins stair A, which connects the first basement to the eighteenth floor and has marble treads, a cast-iron balustrade, and a wooden handrail. The northern bank of elevators, which includes two shafts, is surrounded by stair B, which rises from the second basement to the seventeenth floor. Stair C adjoins a freight elevator. In addition, there is a freight elevator west of stair B, while to the east is stair D, which connects the first through second stories only.

==== Basements ====
Just underneath the western part of the ground story was the grill room, decorated in a modern German style. It was accessed by a marble staircase and elevators, which led to a small vestibule with white tiles. The grill room was decorated in red and orange, and the floor was made of red tiles. The walls and piers were made of a material resembling Caen stone; the walls were also wainscoted in dark oak and contained decorative lighting sconces. The vaulted ceiling consisted of a large arch spanning most of the room, as well as smaller arches that led off the main arch. There were reliefs of arabesques along the grill room's ceiling, which ran along the ceiling's rubs, as well as a pair of wrought-iron chandeliers that were colored to match the design of the ceiling. Most of these decorations have been removed. There is a segmental arch made of terracotta, which led to the Herald Square subway station but has been sealed off. There was also a "Dutch room" with terracotta floors, hand-carved wainscoting on the walls, and murals depicting "quaint and picturesque Holland scenes".

Leading off the grill room was a large humidor, as well as kitchens and serving pantries. These spaces are connected by a corridor leading between the two elevator banks; it has vinyl floors, a plasterboard ceiling, and walls with either wallpaper of plasterboard. A fitness center extends off the eastern wall of the corridor, and there are also ancillary spaces such as utility rooms and offices. The basement also had a barber shop (later a restaurant) leading directly from the subway, There is a boiler room, storage rooms, utility spaces, and employee rooms in the sub-basement. This level has utilitarian decorations such as brick walls, plasterboard ceiling finishes, and concrete floors.

==== Ground story and mezzanine ====
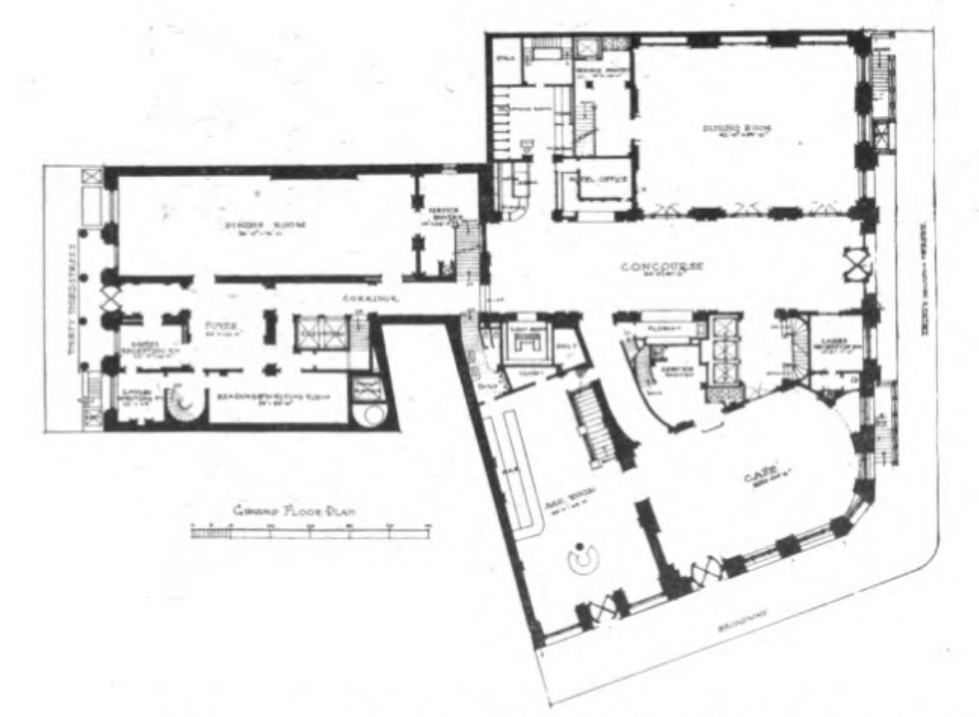
First (ground) floor plan, with east at the top

The ground story contains a large lobby, originally known as the concourse, which extends north from a double-height vestibule on 32nd Street. The vestibule has mosaic-tile floors, paneled walls, clerestory windows facing the mezzanine, and a plasterboard ceiling with a chandelier. The lobby itself also contains inlaid mosaic floor tiles. The walls were of Greek Skyros marble in gray and yellow with light-purple veining. A similar color scheme was used on the coffered ceiling, from which chandeliers are suspended. The eastern part of the lobby has three piers. Within the lobby is a spiral staircase dating from 1907, in addition to an elevator lobby and the stair hall to the west. There is also an antique clock manufactured by King James I's personal clockmaker, H. T. Crawford, for English statesman Ralph Winwood in 1691. The hotel's developer, William R. H. Martin, had purchased the clock from Mrs. Elizabeth C. Cole when the hotel was under construction. The lobby has been redecorated in yellow and blue as of 2022. After the 1910 expansion, a corridor extended between the lobby and a foyer on 33rd Street. This foyer, which served as the original main entrance, has a terrazzo floor dating from the 1930s, and there is space for a restaurant next to it.

The main public rooms were designed in a style that, according to contemporary sources, was inspired by the Galerie d'Apollon in the Louvre. The Broadway Cafe was to the left (west) of the lobby and could be accessed both from Broadway and from the corridor between 32nd and 33rd Streets. The cafe contained walls of light-colored, artificial stone, and its ceiling was treated in the Italian Renaissance style, ornamented in low relief. It was ornamented with Italian-marble columns as well as Pompeiian-style wall panels. The Louis XIV style dining room was to the right (east) of the lobby. It had Circassian-walnut paneling and gold panels on the walls. There were eight gold panels, which contained three-quarter length, life-size depictions of four men and four women, painted by Irving Wiles and Carroll Beckwith. In addition, the dining room had rose-and-gold draperies.

Above the ground level is a mezzanine with two banks of elevators, one each to the north and south. The mezzanine is otherwise plain in design, with floors made of granite, in addition to ceilings and walls made of plasterboard. The mezzanine, overlooking the hotel's ground-level corridor, contained space for the hotel's orchestra, as well as reading and writing rooms. The modern-day ground-floor and mezzanine spaces are divided into retail and restaurant spaces, the latter of which extend onto the mezzanine. There were two restaurants by the 2010s; the Petit Poulet serves French bistro cuisine, while the Martinique Cafe caters in international and American cuisine. In addition, the mezzanine has offices, kitchens, and other non-public rooms.

==== Second story ====
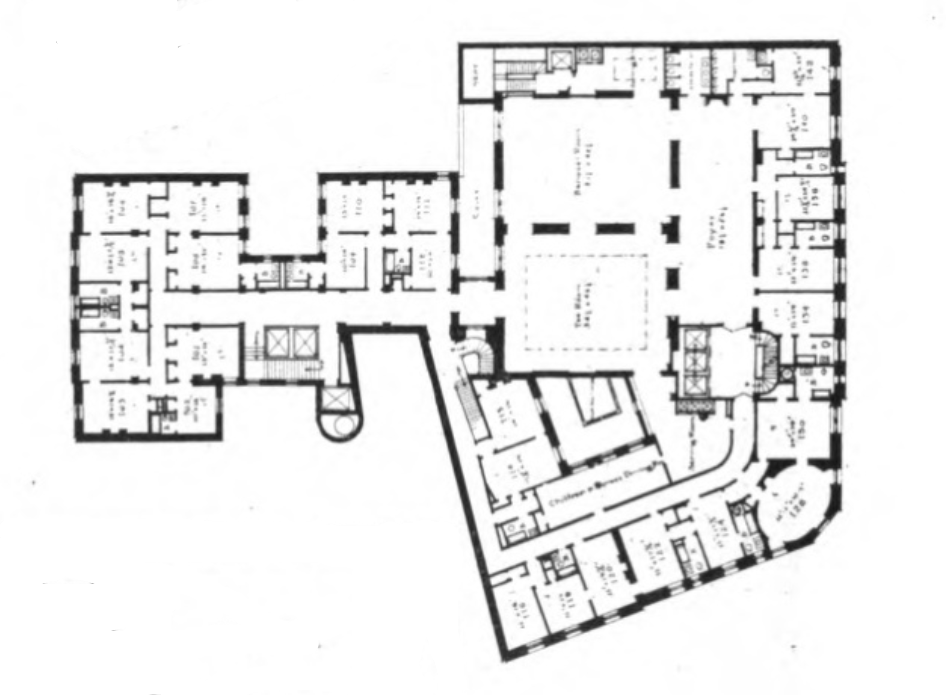
Second floor plan, with east at the top

The second story includes hallways leading west and east from the primary staircase and the southern bank of elevators. These hallways lead to a ballroom and conference rooms. Initially, the second story had a foyer that led to a tea room and banquet room, on the eastern side of the building. The foyer was decorated in the Louis XIV style, with carved, dark oak woodwork and walls completely covered in period tapestries. Within the foyer, there were carved wooden doors with inlaid paneled mirrors. The tea room had artificial stone walls covered with painted-green wooden grillages; the skylight over the entire room was concealed by rafters and grillage with entwined vines. Adjoining the tea room was the Flemish-style banquet room, furnished in dark oak. The tea and banquet rooms have been replaced by the ballroom, which has plasterboard walls and ceilings, in addition to a floor with a carpet.

The western corridor connects with three conference rooms along 32nd Street and Broadway, on the west side of the hotel; these were converted from guest rooms. In general, the second-floor corridors and the conference rooms lack their original decorations and have carpeted floors, plasterboard ceilings, and walls with wallpaper and dadoes. The exception is the northern end of the western corridor, which turns north and then east; this part of the corridor passes through an archway separating the original building and its 1903 annex. This archway connects with a double-loaded corridor, which was part of the original wing's floor layout. In 2006, the hotel had 14,000 square feet (1,300 m^{2}) of convention space, which included a grand ballroom, an executive boardroom, and breakout rooms. As of 2021, the hotel has 9,000 square feet (840 m^{2}) of event space in 14 rooms, which can fit 500 people.

==== Rooms ====
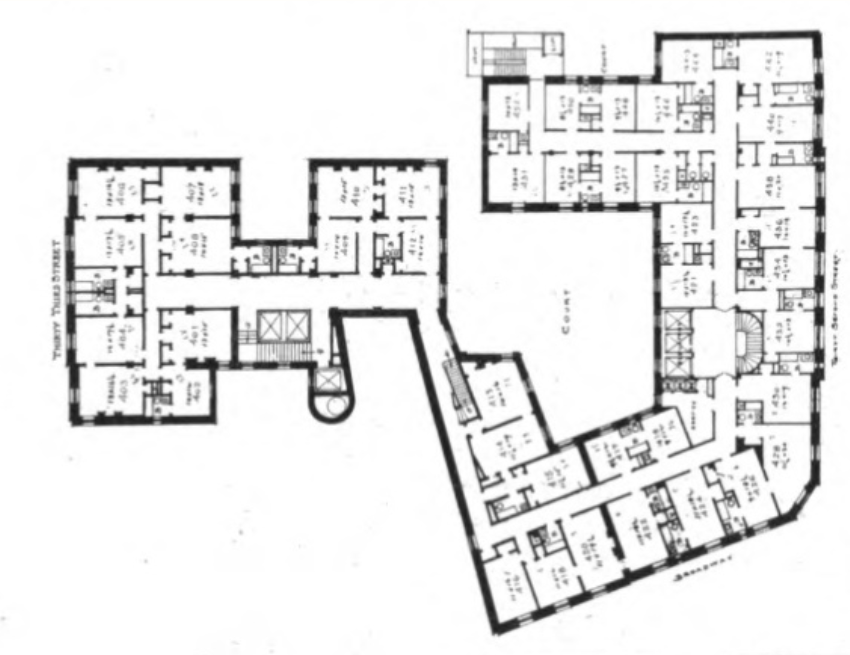
Guestroom story floor plan, with east at the top

The Martinique has 532 rooms. After the hotel's two annexes were completed, in 1910, it had 600 guest rooms and 400 bathrooms. On each story, each of the hotel's three sections has a double-loaded corridor, connecting with the corridors in the other wing. The northern wing on 33rd Street has a north–south corridor; the western wing on Broadway has a west–east corridor; and the southern wing on 32nd Street has a U-shaped corridor, surrounding a light court to the north. These corridors are served by two elevator banks: the southern bank at the south end of the 32nd Street wing, and the northern bank at the center of the 33rd Street wing. The corridors have carpeted floors, plasterboard ceilings, and walls with wallpaper and dadoes.

When the hotel opened, the rooms contained water filters and soundproof partitions. Originally, guests could have their breakfast delivered directly to their rooms. The suites at the southwest corner, facing the intersection of Broadway and 32nd Street, contained elliptical parlors. The modern-day guest rooms have carpeted floors, along with plasterboard ceilings and walls; none of the original ornamentation remains in the guest rooms. On the seventeenth floor, there is a lounge at the southwestern corner with similar ornamentation to the guest rooms. The eighteenth floor is devoid of decorations, and there is a penthouse structure above the southern portion of that floor.

== History ==
When the Hotel Martinique was developed at the end of the 19th century, many commercial structures were being developed around Herald Square. Manhattan's theater district had begun to shift northward along Broadway, from Union Square and Madison Square to Herald Square and eventually Times Square, during the first decade of the 20th century. One block to the east, new department store buildings were quickly being developed on Fifth Avenue. Because of growing demand for these theaters and department stores, numerous hotels were developed on Broadway between Madison Square and Times Square during the late 19th and early 20th century, including the Martinique. The opening of Pennsylvania Station, Macy's Herald Square, and the Hudson and Manhattan Railroad's 33rd Street Terminal in the 1900s further spurred growth immediately around Herald Square.

=== Original hotel ===
==== Development and early years ====
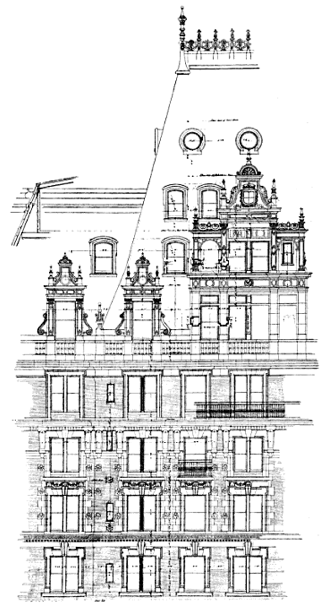
Partial elevation of the Hotel Martinique, upper part, 32nd Street elevation

The hotel was developed by William R. H. Martin, who headed the Rogers Peet business and named the hotel after himself. Martin had opened a store at 1260 Broadway c. 1889–1890, several years before companies such as Saks Fifth Avenue and Macy's opened their stores in the area. Martin purchased the first part of the hotel's site in 1892 and expanded it in 1893 and 1895. He then hired Henry Janeway Hardenbergh to design a French Renaissance-style hotel on the site. Hardenbergh filed plans for the new hotel in July 1897. The hotel, located at 54–58 West 33rd Street, was planned to be 16 stories high and was budgeted at $400,000. The Hotel Martinique was originally intended as an apartment hotel. A floor plan of the Martinique was included in a contemporary real-estate journal article about apartment hotels. The uptown store of Rogers Peet was in the same building. Martin began running a series of short ads to introduce his house, the ads appearing several times a week in the Sun and Times.

Although the hotel opened in 1898 as a speculative investment, it instantly became popular. The Real Estate Record and Guide wrote in April 1899 that "the Martinique has a waiting list of 65 names, and that at least one suite of two rooms and bath, rented at $500, has been sublet at $1,200". The success of the Martinique prompted another developer to construct an apartment hotel on a neighboring site. Soon after the Martinique opened, Martin converted the Martinique to a transient hotel; even this did not provide enough room for the growing demand of the neighborhood. Mary L. George, who owned the neighboring lots at 1266 and 1268 Broadway, leased the site to Martin. George then filed plans for a 16-story annex for the Hotel Martinique in November 1900, to be designed by Hardenbergh. The Construction News wrote in 1901 that the annex "is said to be the first hotel building in the world to use fireproof wood throughout". The first annex was completed in 1903. This annex included a bar room accessed by a storefront with granite pilasters.

In June 1905, Martin rehired Hardenbergh to design an annex on the northeast corner of Broadway and 32nd Street, which at the time was occupied by the Rogers Peet store at 1260 Broadway. The new annex was to measure 100 feet (30 m) on Broadway and 125 feet (38 m) on 32nd Street. That November, Martin bought several adjacent row houses at 42–52 West 33rd Street. A set of restaurants and a cafe opened within the hotel in 1906; at the time, William Taylor and Son were the managers. Work on the planned annex stalled for two years because Martin wished to relocate the Rogers Peet store to the Marbridge Building, which he was constructing two blocks north, before beginning work on the annex. Hardenbergh filed plans for the second annex in October 1907, and the Rogers Peet store moved to the first three stories of the Marbridge Building. The firm of Moran and Jones designed 388 rooms in the new annex, which also included an enlarged main entrance and various public spaces on the lowest stories. The expansion opened on December 21, 1910, at which point daily room rates ranged from $3.50 to $6.00 and up. Walter Chandler managed the newly expanded hotel, which could accommodate 1,200 diners and 1,000 transient guests in 600 guest rooms.

==== 1910s to 1930s ====
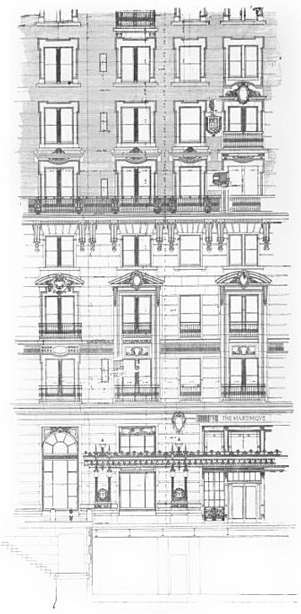
Partial elevation of the lower part, 32nd Street elevation

The development of the second annex had coincided with the opening of Penn Station and the Hudson and Manhattan Railroad terminal. To attract visitors from Penn Station, the hotel's managers transported guests' baggage to and from the station free of charge. In the 1910s, the hotel housed some long-term residents, such as physician Cornelia A. Walker and former New York deputy attorney general Job E. Hedges. The Professional Golfers' Association of America (PGA) was established at the hotel on April 10, 1916. The hotel also hosted such events as the New York State Bankers' Association's annual meetings, the American Clothing Designers Associations' meetings, and luncheons for local civic group Broadway Association. The Martinique was initially licensed to serve liquor at night, but the city government revoked this license in 1913. The hotel was the first in New York City to obtain a cabaret license; among its performers was vaudevillian Gus Edwards. The Omar Khayyam room served as the venue for the Gus Edwards Revue's "1918 Version of a Night with Omar Khayyam", a twice-nightly performance. and PGA members continued to meet there over the years.

T. Coleman du Pont of the Greeley Square Company, which operated the neighboring McAlpin Hotel, bought the Martinique from the Martin family in October 1919. The Martinique was renamed the McAlpin Annex the same month, and the du Pont family renovated the public rooms into storefronts. The hotel's manager Frank E. Jago restored the Hotel Martinique's original name in May 1921, saying that the McAlpin Annex name had created confusion. The Pennsylvania Drug Company leased a storefront on the southern side of the ground story the same year, within the space originally occupied by the dining room. As a result, a new restaurant was built on the northern side of the ground story. By the 1920s, the entertainment district around Herald Square had largely relocated northward to Times Square. Harry F. Young, a climber who was scaling the hotel for a film, fell nine stories to his death in 1923, prompting the New York City Council to ban "street exhibitions of a foolhardy character in climbing the outer walks of buildings by human beings".

Frank A. Duggan took over as the hotel's manager in May 1928. The 56 East 59th Street Corporation, led by Louis Markel, bought the hotel from the Greeley Square Company that November. Markel headed the Martinique Hotel Corporation, which officially took title to the hotel at the beginning of January 1929. Markel planned to spend $250,000 remodeling the hotel. In August 1930, the media reported that a Chicago-based department store was considering paying $9 million for the Martinique and neighboring structures, then redeveloping the site. However, two companies signed long-term leases for storefronts in the hotel the following month, preventing the department store's development for the time being.

The Metropolitan Life Insurance Company foreclosed on a mortgage loan for the Martinique in December 1931, claiming that the hotel's owners had not made mortgage payments for two years. A foreclosure auction for the hotel was scheduled for May 1933. The same month, Metropolitan Life bid $500,000, taking ownership of the building and most of the site. Metropolitan Life also took over the previous owners' lease of a 39-foot-wide (12 m) parcel of land on Broadway, which had belonged to Mary J. George. Metropolitan Life hired Francis Keally in 1936 to design a renovation of the ground-floor restaurant. Part of the restaurant became a bar, and the Broadway cafe and main restaurant received classical decorations and air conditioning. These renovations, along with the ongoing replacement of the Sixth Avenue elevated line with the Sixth Avenue subway nearby, were expected to increase visitation to the area. George Bernard, a retired women's apparel dealer, acquired the plot of land on Broadway from the executor of Mary George's estate in 1937 for $152,000.

==== 1940s to 1960s ====
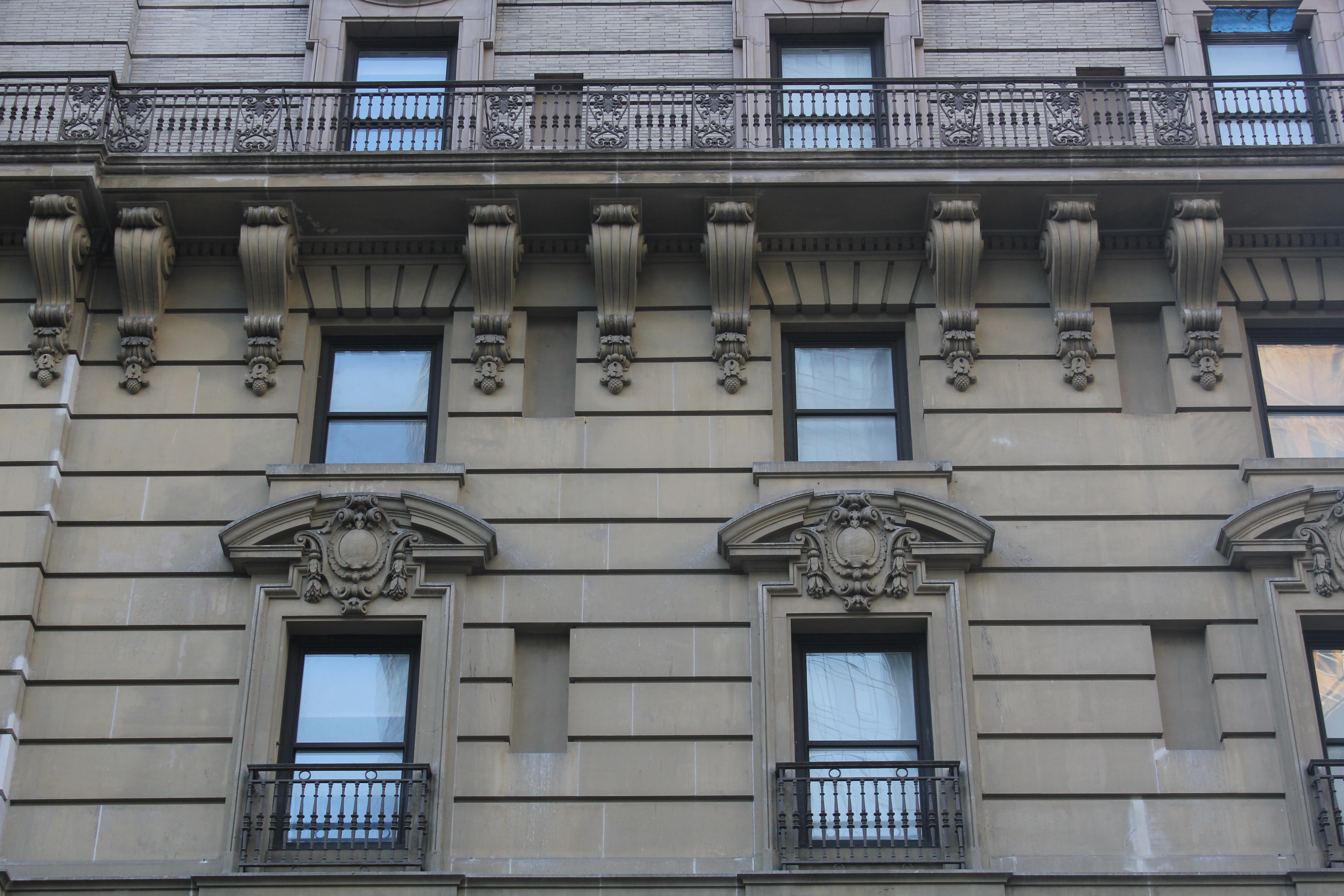
Lower stories seen from Broadway

Metropolitan Life leased the hotel in 1939 to a syndicate headed by Frank W. Kridel. The hotel was undergoing an extensive renovation at the time of the sale, which included a refurbishment of the guest rooms. The hotel continued to host events in the 1940s, such as meetings of the American Jewish Committee and the New York State Committee on Discrimination in Housing. Kridel's syndicate bought the hotel in 1944. By then, the hotel and the underlying land was valued at $2.25 million; the syndicate also took over a $1.3 million mortgage. During World War II, German saboteurs Richard Quirin and Heinrich Harm Heinck, notorious for their involvement in Operation Pastorius, stayed at the Hotel Martinique, against the recommendation of German spy George John Dasch. In September 1947, the Martinique's managers attempted to raise the rent for its permanent guests by 30 percent. The New York Supreme Court initially ruled against the hotel's managers in early 1948, but the Appellate Division subsequently reversed the Supreme Court's ban.

Kridel continued to manage the hotel until September 1954, when he sold the building to a syndicate that included Robert Selby; the hotel was then assessed at $1.8 million. Selby's syndicate, Martinique Associates, also included the businessmen Robert Sillins and Al Schwartz. After the new owners took title to the hotel, they began planning a renovation of the property. In anticipation of the opening of the New York Coliseum, the Heritage Hotel Group announced plans in early 1956 to renovate the hotel for $1 million. The work involved renovating all guest rooms, adding air conditioning throughout the hotel, and restoring the ballrooms. About 300 of the hotel's 650 rooms were being completed before mid-1956. The exterior sign was replaced, one of the dining rooms became a coffee shop, and another dining space became an off-Broadway venue called the Martinique Theatre. The theater opened in March 1958.

Tourism in New York City suffered during the 1960s and 1970s, leading many hotel operators to convert their hotels into apartment buildings. The Martinique's business in particularly was negatively impacted, as Manhattan's theater district had migrated north to Times Square, though many businesses and transit stations remained around Herald Square. The hotel was also functionally outdated; the guestrooms did not have en-suite bathrooms, as newer hotels did. The tea and banquet rooms on the second floor were merged and were leased to a church by 1969.

=== Homeless shelter ===
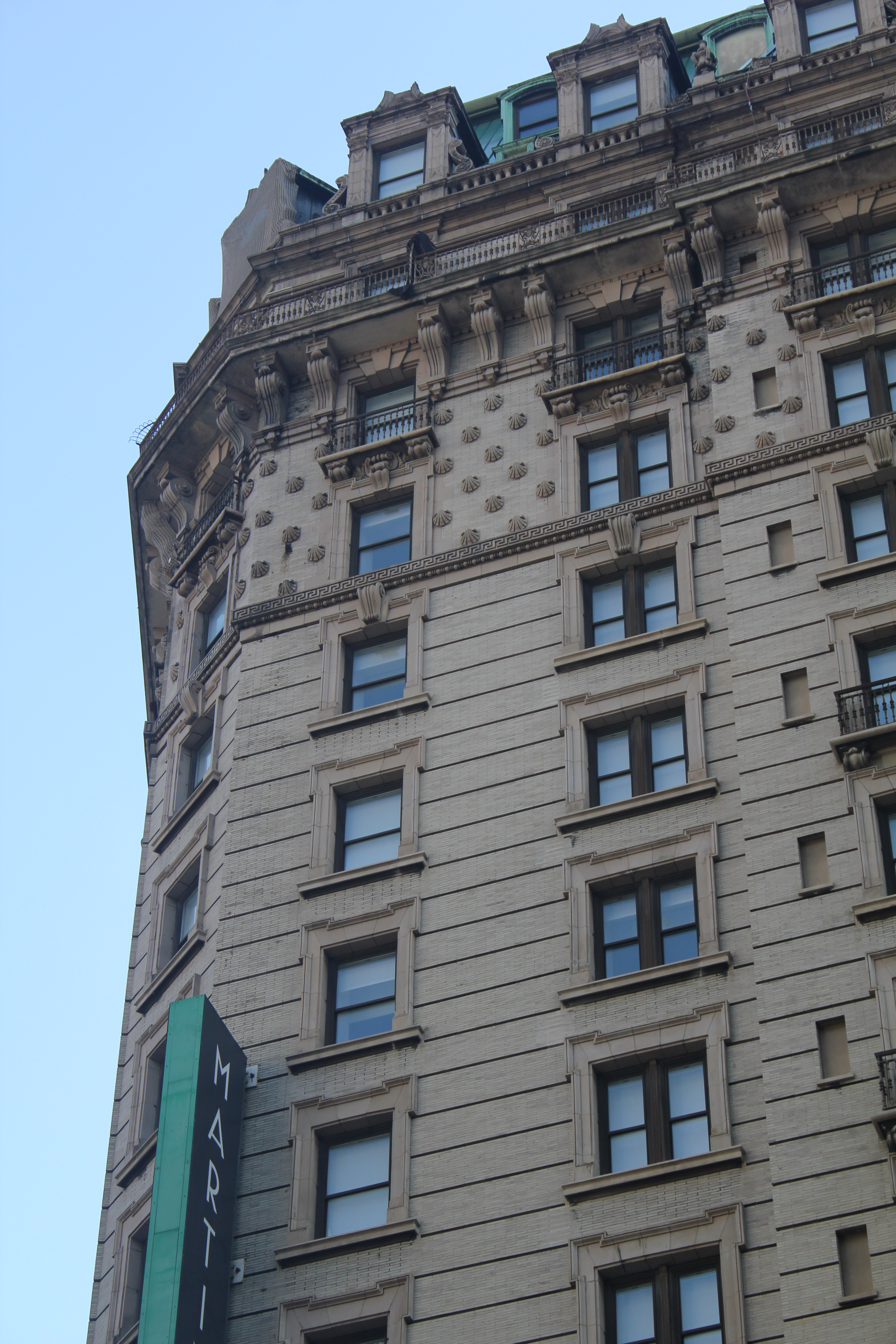
Southwest corner facade seen from 32nd Street

In the early 1970s, the American Red Cross and the government of New York City started using the Martinique as a homeless shelter for families. Sources disagree on whether this conversion took place in 1970, 1972, or 1973. Over the next two decades, the New York City government spent over $1 million per year to use the hotel as a shelter. Initially, the Martinique was a temporary shelter, housing families for only a short period of time. Over the years, the hotel typically housed families who could not be assigned to shelters in their own boroughs due to overcrowding, as well as those displaced by fire. The hotel became infamous as a homeless shelter. United Press International said the Martinique became "a national symbol of the helplessness and squalor faced by those too poor to afford housing", while local newspaper Newsday wrote: "The Martinique is a building that reeks of despair and of broken dreams. It is often called a symbol of the city's inability to deal with the homeless population."

The reverend of the nearby Church of St. Francis of Assisi said in 1974 that the hotel housed 300 families, along with 175 "discharges from mental hospitals, addicts, and alcoholics". The Washington Post estimated in 1987 that one-sixth of the city's 12,000 homeless children lived at the Martinique, even though the hotel lacked basic facilities such as kitchens in each room. By December 1985, the Martinique housed over 1,400 children in 389 families; eighteen months later, there were 438 families. According to a 1986 analysis, families stayed at the Martinique for an average of 16 months. The author Jonathan Kozol analyzed conditions at the Martinique for his 1988 book Rachel and Her Children, a study of homeless families. According to Kozol, it cost $2,000 per month for a room housing a family of four and $3,000 per month for a family of six. The federal government paid 50 percent of this cost, while the state and city governments paid 25 percent each.

Children who lived at the hotel had no dedicated play area; The New York Times wrote in 1983 that "the stench of urine and marijuana is everywhere". As a result, the hotel's children often used drugs, shoplifted, and harassed bystanders in Herald Square. In 1986, Manhattan Community Board 5 provided funding to convert the hotel's former ballroom (which had been used as storage space since 1956) into a play area for the children who were housed there. Around the same time, state officials received complaints that families at the Martinique occupied "cramped, subdivided rooms without bathrooms [or] furniture". The city government ultimately fined the hotel's owners in 1988 after finding that the guest rooms had been divided into cubicles of as small as 9 by 12 feet (2.7 by 3.7 m). The hotel lacked in-room telephones, heat, running water, or elevator service, and the facade had become extremely shabby. The hotel's owners also removed asbestos from the lobby in 1987, but city officials had not authorized the work.

After the administration of U.S. president Ronald Reagan threatened to withdraw $70 million in federal funding, in 1988, mayor Ed Koch announced that he would close 46 welfare hotels within two years. The first of these hotels to close was the Martinique, which stopped accepting guests at the beginning of September 1988. Subsequently, the New York City government began relocating 443 families from the hotel. The hotel had been closed by the end of December 1988, and the last homeless families had left the Martinique by the beginning of the next month. The displaced families were relocated to permanent apartments in other shelters; units in New York City Housing Authority developments; apartments that the city government had renovated; or their own accommodations. The hotel's owners were banned from demolishing the hotel or converting it to another use because of a New York City law that sought to preserve single room occupancy hotels. The owners, who wished to market the space to Koreatown merchants, sought an exemption from the law.

=== Reopening as hotel ===
==== Thurman operation ====
The developer Harold Thurman leased the building from Seasons Affiliates for 99 years in 1989, with plans to reopen the Martinique Hotel as a franchise of the Days Inn chain. The Martinique sat vacant through the mid-1990s, even as Thurman gradually renovated the interior. By 1994, the renovation had stalled because of increasing costs, and the owner and lessee were involved in a legal dispute over the Martinique's renovation. For several years, Thurman struggled to obtain financing for the hotel. In 1996, Thurman announced plans to operate the shuttered Martinique as a 530-room Holiday Inn hotel as part of a franchise agreement. Workers began restoring the facade, replacing the roof tiles, and rearranging the interior layout. Preservationists expressed concerns that Holiday Inn would significantly modify the hotel's facade. The New York City Landmarks Preservation Commission designated the hotel as a New York City landmark on May 5, 1998.

The Martinique reopened in October 1998 as the Holiday Inn Martinique on Broadway. At the time, rooms were being marketed at $215 to $295 per night, in what USA Today described as "a vivid manifestation of New York City's about-face". Carlson Hotels took over the hotel in 2006 and announced plans to renovate it as part of the Radisson chain. The hotel was rebranded as the Radisson Hotel Martinique on July 1, 2006, and the guest rooms were extensively renovated. Carlson proposed adding 6,000 square feet (560 m^{2}) of meeting space in the hotel. In addition, a bistro and a supper club opened within the hotel, supplementing a cafe and an Asian restaurant that already operated within the Martinique. The American Ryder Cup golf team was regularly announced at the Radisson Martinique, as in 2008, when Paul Azinger announced the names of four team members. The PGA Gallery at the Radisson Martinique was dedicated in 2011, marking the 95th anniversary of the PGA's establishment in the Martinique.

In 2018, the hotel's lessees Herald Hotel Associates decided to instead partner with Hilton Hotels & Resorts, saying that the Radisson partnership was not as profitable as Herald Hotels had desired. The Hilton partnership included a $40 million renovation of the Martinique. The hotel joined Hilton's Curio Collection division on February 1, 2019, and was renamed the Martinique New York on Broadway, Curio Collection by Hilton.

==== COVID-19 closure and sale ====
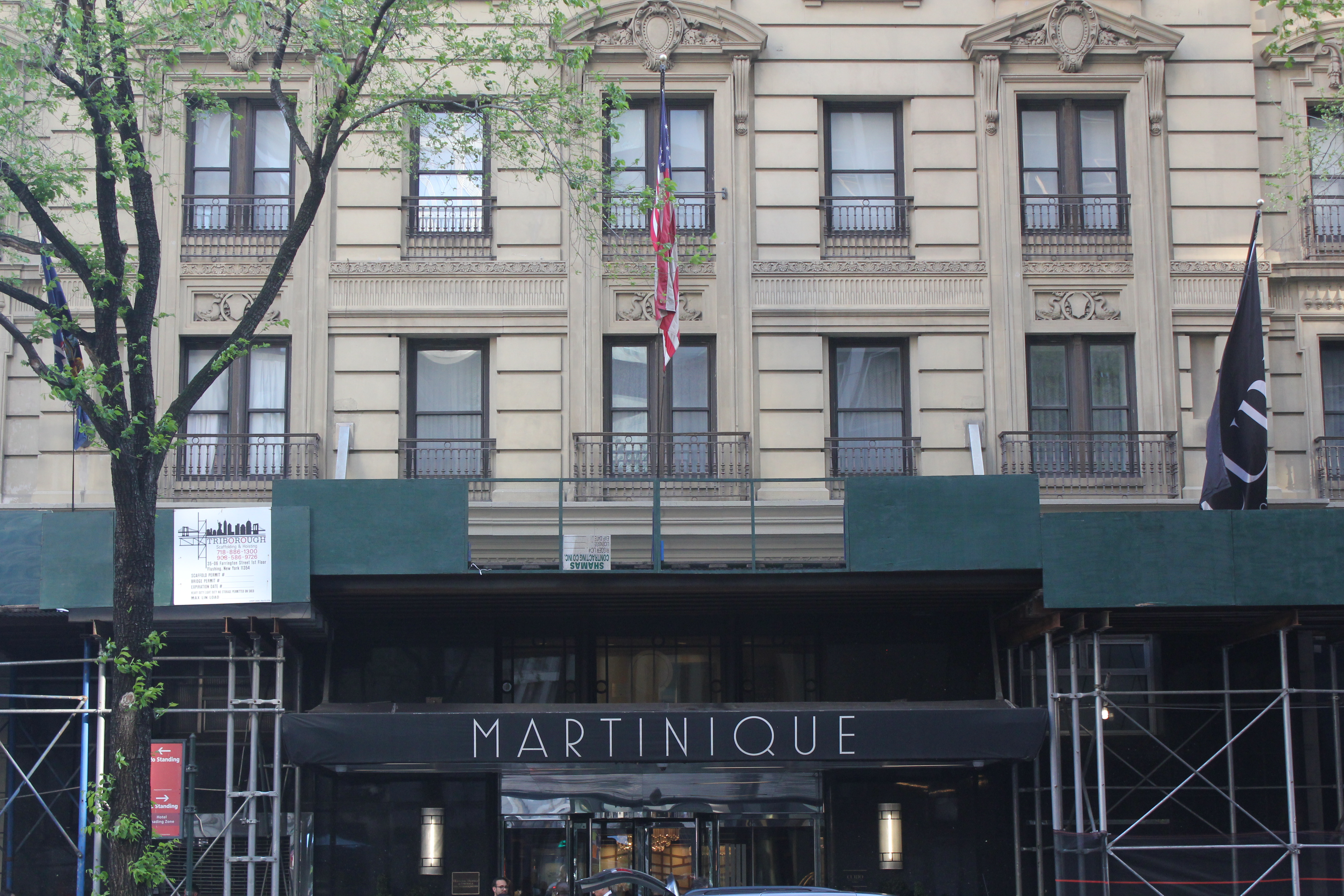
Main entrance seen from 32nd Street

The hotel was forced to close in March 2020 during the COVID-19 pandemic in New York City, and the operators laid off many of the hotel's 176 workers. As a result of the pandemic, the hotel filed for Chapter 11 bankruptcy protection in September 2020. When Thurman died at the end of 2020, the hotel's operators defaulted on their mortgage. By early the following year, Herald Hotel was seeking to sell its lease of the Martinique Hotel, which was scheduled to run for another 68 years. However, the hotel had trouble attracting buyers because the lease was expensive, the building was a landmark, and the hotel required $15 million in repairs to its facade.

Burnett Equities, a firm based in Oklahoma City, bought the hotel in November 2021 for $55.5 million. Burnett Equities president Andy Burnett renegotiated the terms of the land lease following a dinner with the landowner's daughter, and he leased out 30,000 square feet (2,800 m^{2}) of empty storefront space to three restaurants. The hotel reopened the next month, with 200 rooms. Burnett Equities hired Steven Kratchman Architect, which had been renovating the hotel for the past 15 years, as the hotel's architect of record in 2022. Burnett restarted the renovation project, expanding the retail space from six to seven storefronts, as well as completing renovations to the guest rooms and the lower section of the facade. Crain's New York wrote at the time: "The parts of the Martinique that have held on across more than a century—the tiles, the baroque molding and the marble stairs—will continue to stand the test of time." The LPC approved the proposed exterior renovations in August 2023.

== See also ==
- List of buildings and structures on Broadway in Manhattan
- List of hotels in New York City
- List of New York City Designated Landmarks in Manhattan from 14th to 59th Streets
