= Darragh House =

Historic house in Arkansas, United States

- U.S. National Register of Historic Places
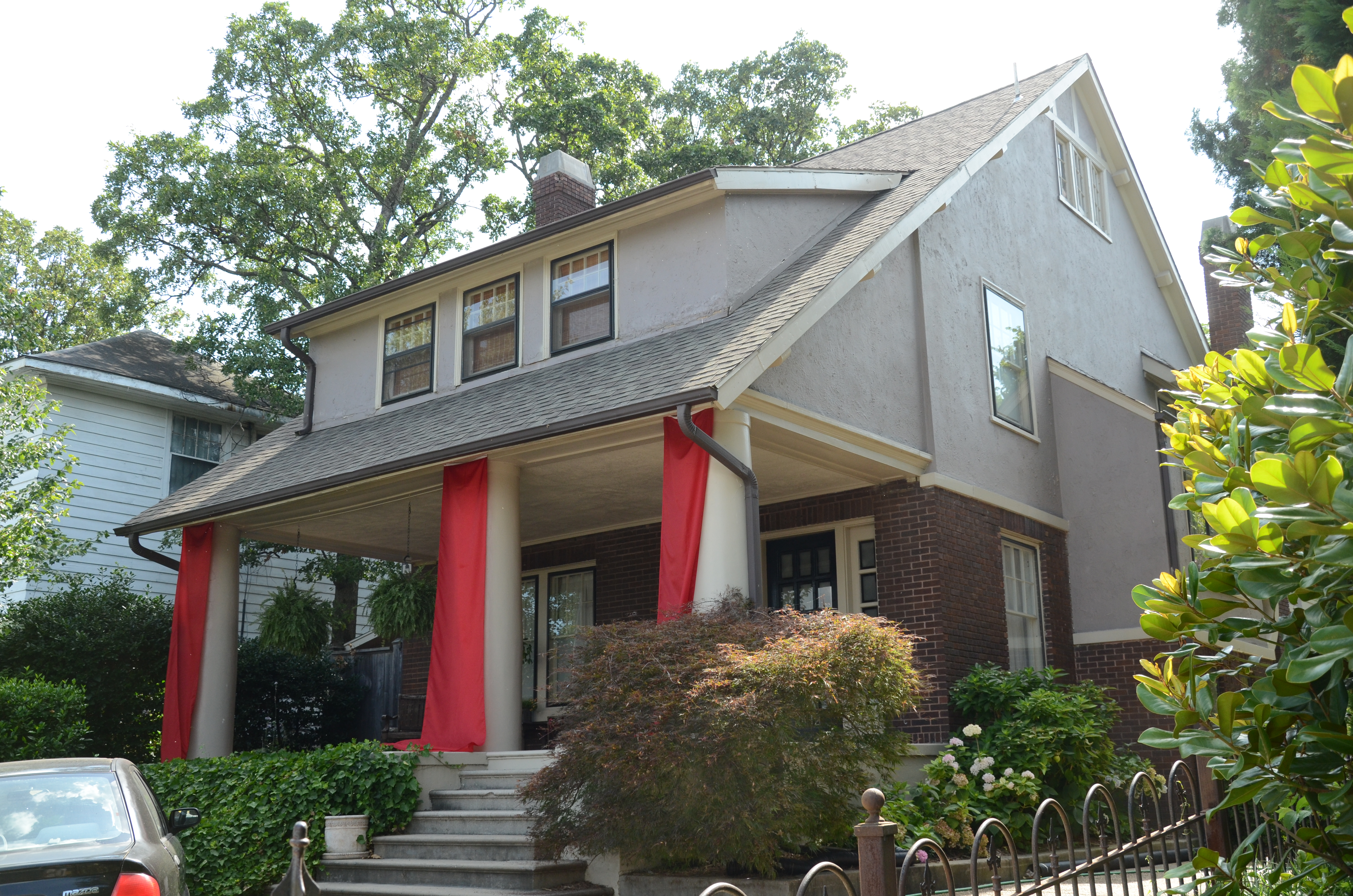

- Location within Arkansas Location within the United States
- Location: 2412 Broadway, Little Rock, Arkansas
- Coordinates: 34°43′29″N 92°16′44″W
- Area: less than one acre
- Built: 1916
- Architect: Charles L. Thompson
- Architectural style: Colonial Revival, Dutch Colonial
- MPS: Thompson, Charles L., Design Collection TR
- NRHP reference No.: 82000884
- Added to NRHP: December 22, 1982

The Darragh House is a historic house in Little Rock, Arkansas. It is a 1 1/2-story frame structure, its exterior finished in brick and stucco, with a side gable roof pierced by broad shed-roof dormers, giving it a Dutch Colonial feel. The roof hangs over a recessed porch, supported by oversized Tuscan columns. Built about 1916, the house is a distinctive local example of the work of noted Arkansas architect Charles L. Thompson.

The house was listed on the U.S. National Register of Historic Places in 1982.

== See also ==
- National Register of Historic Places listings in Little Rock, Arkansas
