= Charles Grilk House =

Historic house in Iowa, United States

- U.S. National Register of Historic Places
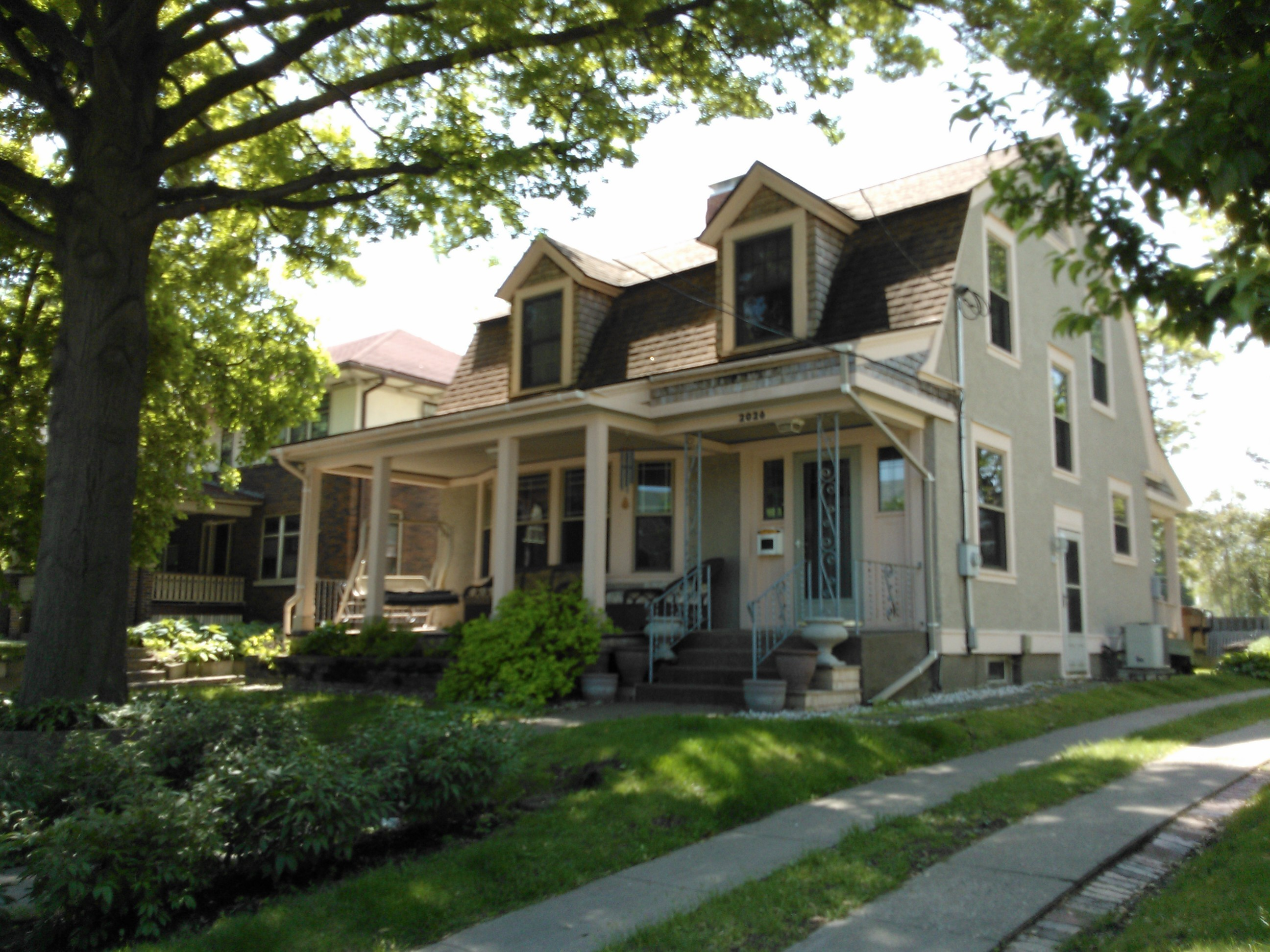

- Location within Iowa Location within the United States
- Location: 2026 Main St. Davenport, Iowa
- Coordinates: 41°32′24″N 90°34′32″W
- Area: less than one acre
- Built: 1906
- Architect: Temple, Burrows & McLane
- Architectural style: Bungalow/Craftsman; Dutch Colonial Revival
- MPS: Davenport MRA
- NRHP reference No.: 84001423
- Added to NRHP: July 27, 1984

The Charles Grilk House is a historic building located in the central part of Davenport, Iowa, United States. It has been listed on the National Register of Historic Places since 1984.

== History ==
The house was designed by the Davenport architectural firm of Temple, Burrows & McLane, and is an example of one of their more modest designs. It is a reminder that architects also designed houses for people with smaller budgets as well as those who are wealthy and build larger homes. The dwelling was featured in the February 1907 edition of Architectural Review as a "Plaster House." The house was built in 1906 for Charles Grilk and has a history of brief and complicated residency and occupancy patterns.

== Architecture ==
The house is a modified Dutch Colonial Revival Bungalow with an American Craftsman aesthetic in its use of materials and the self-contained efficiency of its plan. The 1½-story, frame house, follows a rectangular plan. It features a narrow, molded cornice; side-gambrel roof; and two dormers on the front. The main entrance into the house is flanked by sidelights and covered by a flared eave. There is a polygonal-bay next to the main entry.
