= Hotel Pierrepont =

Coordinates: 40.748234°N 73.987454°W

Hotel Pierrepont was an establishment located at 43 West 32nd Street between Broadway and Fifth Avenue in Manhattan, New York City. Completed in 1906, the building was twelve stories tall, made of fireproof brick and stone. It had a cellar and a subcellar. It had one hundred seventy rooms, with single rooms and suites, and ninety bathrooms. The edifice measured fifty-nine feet by ninety-eight and nine tenths feet. It was located adjacent to the Rogers Peet building. Hotel Pierrepont is important to the history of Manhattan in the early 20th century. It is memorable for its prime location.

Hotel Pierrepont was sold at an auction on May 19, 1910, by Joseph P. Dav. There was another Hotel Pierrepont in New York City. It was located at 55 Pierrepont Street in Brooklyn, and was still standing in the 1930s. The hotel is now Pierrepont House, a senior residence of Catholic Charities.

== See also ==
- List of former hotels in Manhattan
