= William R. H. Martin =

American businessman

William R. H. Martin (1842, St. Louis, Missouri - January 30, 1912, Manhattan, New York) was an American businessman and one of the largest holders of real estate in Manhattan. He became head of Rogers Peet in 1877, and he was the owner and developer of the Hotel Martinique (now the Radisson Hotel Martinique).
