= 2 Herald Square =

Building in Manhattan, New York

Coordinates: 40°45′00″N 73°59′14″W

- Alternative names: Marbridge Building

General information
- Location: 1328 Broadway; Manhattan, New York City, New York
- Construction started: 1906
- Completed: 1909

Height
- Height: 144 feet (44 m)

Technical details
- Floor count: 12

Design and construction
- Architects: Townsend, Steinle & Haskell

2 Herald Square (originally the Marbridge Building) is an office building at 1328 Broadway, on the east side of Sixth Avenue between 34th and 35th Streets in Herald Square, Manhattan, New York City. It opened in 1909, an 11-story structure, utilized in part by men's clothier Rogers Peet. Until October 1910 it stood opposite the Alpine apartment house, which was at the northeast corner of Broadway and 33rd Street. The Alpine and old stores between 33rd and 34th Streets were demolished to make room for the $5,000,000 Hotel McAlpin near the end of 1910. On the other side of Broadway were located the Macy's Herald Square and Saks Incorporated stores, with the Gimbels store just below.

Initially, John McGraw, then the manager of the New York Giants baseball team, ran a billiards parlor in the newly opened building. He was associated in this venture with Mike Donlin, one of the Giants' outfielders. Pool playing phenomenon Willy Hoppe took over this business in January 1912 when McGraw and Donlin moved to the Studebaker Building, 48th Street and Broadway. They started a new billiard and pool room there.

== As a business building ==
Marbridge Building tenants included Ashley M. Herron, who moved his offices from the St. James Building to the Marbridge Building in February 1908. The Lincoln Stock & Bond Company maintained offices there in 1910. as did S. Andrew Hartman. The Emerson Motor Company leased space at the Marbridge Building in 1916.

Members of the committee on course rules and regulations for a New York City-to-San Diego long-distance yacht race met in the Marbridge Building in March 1912. The race was associated with the San Diego Exposition of 1912, which maintained its offices in the establishment. Sam Kronsky formed a syndicate to buy the Marbridge Building in 1920. Dudley Scrymser Macdonald, a real estate broker, was manager of the Marbridge Building for thirty-five years. Maurice Meyer, a past president of Meyer Brothers department store of Paterson, New Jersey, was a former officer of the Marbridge Building Corporation.

== As a shoe store ==
The Samuel Kronsky Company obtained a new low interest mortgage for $2,000,000 on the building in January 1951. The mortgage was extended by the East River Savings Bank. At this time Macy's used a large part of the basement of the structure for offices. The building was renovated for additional office space and stores in 1951 by C.P. Xenis, engineer. A syndicate of investors headed by Henry Goelet and Morris Furman bought the building in October 1954. In 1955 Sebago-Moc Co. footwear leased a store in the structure as did Kitty Kelly Shoes. The latter was the largest store in a chain, with an area of over 6,000 square feet (560 m^{2}). It included a mezzanine which continued through to 35th Street.

In February 1960 the building became the home of the Mercedes Shoe Import Corporation and the Milan Shoe Corporation. Later in the year Gamins, Inc., Matthew Gronfein, and Julius Alderman leased space there. The Marbridge Building was primarily a home to the women's footwear industry in New York City in 1960. The men's shoe industry was centered in the Reade Street and Duane Street area. In April 1969 Harry B. Helmsley and Irving Schneider purchased thirty buildings which comprised the total assets of the Furman-Wolfson Trust, which was valued at $165,000,000. The twenty-two office buildings involved in the sale included half the land under the Marbridge Building.

The Empire State Building and the Marbridge Building were primary lessors to the footwear industry in the 1970s. By late 1984, these businesses began to relocate to an area of midtown Manhattan from Fifth Avenue to Sixth Avenue between 56th Street, 57th Street, and 58th Street.

== 21st century ==
RFR Holding purchased the building in 2000 from the Investment Properties Associates portfolio, formerly controlled by Harry B. Helmsley. Publicis, a marketing firm, moved its United States offices to the Marbridge Building in 2002. The company leased 114,000 square feet of space across four E-shaped floors. Publicis officials initially opposed moving there, but Morris Adjmi Architects, then an architect with the firm MAP, encouraged Publicis executives to take a second look. The E-shaped design enabled Publicis to situate many employees on the same floor while avoiding the appearance of an insurance company. Adjmi designed an elliptical staircase from the 8th to the 11th floors, connecting the floors together. Publicis used the north facade to hang a red banner with the company's lion-head logo.

TIAA, the Teachers Insurance & Annuity Association, paid $365 million for the land under the building in 2014 from the property management firm SL Green. At the time, Sitt Asset Management leased the site. After a foreclosure action against Sitt, SL Green bought part of the lease in 2018. The firm acquired a further 95% stake in the leasehold on 2 Herald Square for $7 million. At the time, only 35% of the building was occupied, and the structure carried a $182.5 million mortgage. TIAA terminated SL Green's lease in March 2025, claiming that the property manager had failed to pay $30 million in rent, taxes, and other fees over the preceding year.
