= Dutch Colonial Revival architecture =

Style of domestic architecture

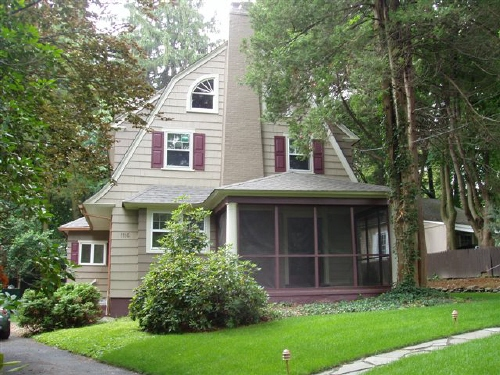
Dutch Colonial Revival house in Plainfield, New Jersey

Dutch Colonial Revival is a style of domestic architecture, primarily characterized by gambrel roofs having curved eaves along the length of the house. Modern versions built in the early 20th century are more accurately referred to as "Dutch Colonial Revival", a subtype of the Colonial Revival style.

== History ==
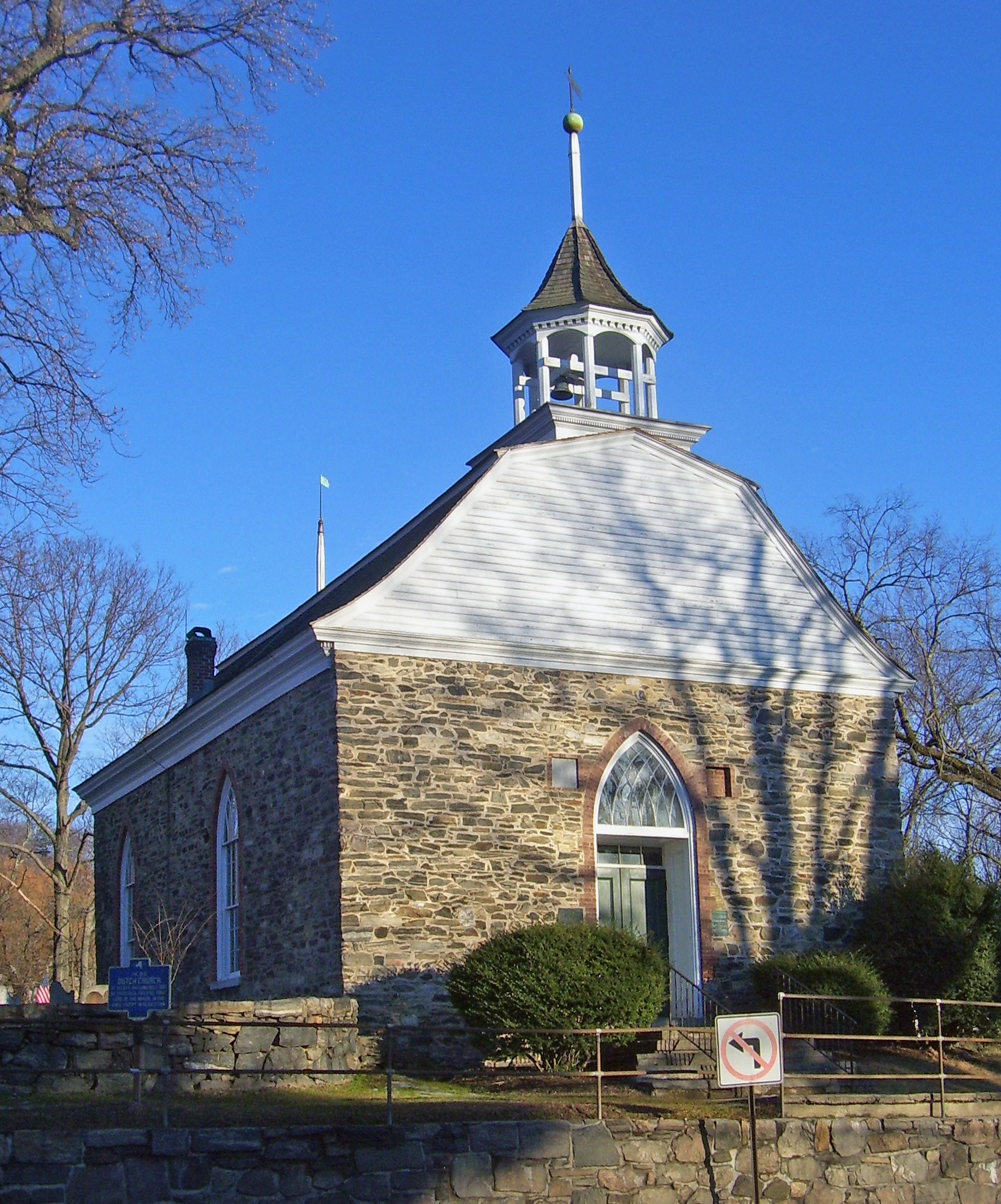
Remnants of colonial Dutch influence, such as the Old Dutch Church of Sleepy Hollow from 1697, became the basis of revivalist styling.

The modern use of the term is to indicate a broad gambrel roof with flaring eaves that extend over the long sides, resembling a barn in construction. The early houses built by settlers were often a single room, with additions added to either end (or short side) and very often a porch along both long sides. Typically, walls were made of stone and a chimney was located on one or both ends. Common were double-hung sash windows with outward swinging wood shutters and a central double Dutch door.

Settlers of the Dutch colonies in New York, Delaware, New Jersey, and western Connecticut built these homes in ways familiar to the regions of Europe from which they came, like the Low Countries, the Palatine parts of Germany, and Huguenot regions of France. Used for its modern meaning of "gambrel-roofed house", the term does not reflect the fact that housing styles in Dutch-founded communities in New York evolved over time. In the Hudson Valley, for example, the use of brick, or brick and stone is perhaps more characteristic of Dutch Colonial houses than is their use of a gambrel roof. In Albany and Ulster Counties, frame houses were almost unknown before 1776, while in Dutchess and Westchester Counties, the presence of a greater proportion of settlers with English roots popularised more construction of wood-frame houses. After a period of log cabin and bank-dugout construction, the use of the inverted "V" roof shape was common. The gambrel roof was used later, predominantly between 1725 and 1775, although examples can be found from as early as 1705. The general rule before 1776 was to build houses that were only one-and-a-half stories high, except in Albany, where there were a greater proportion of two-story houses. Fine examples of these houses can be found today, like those in the Huguenot Street Historic District of New Paltz, New York.

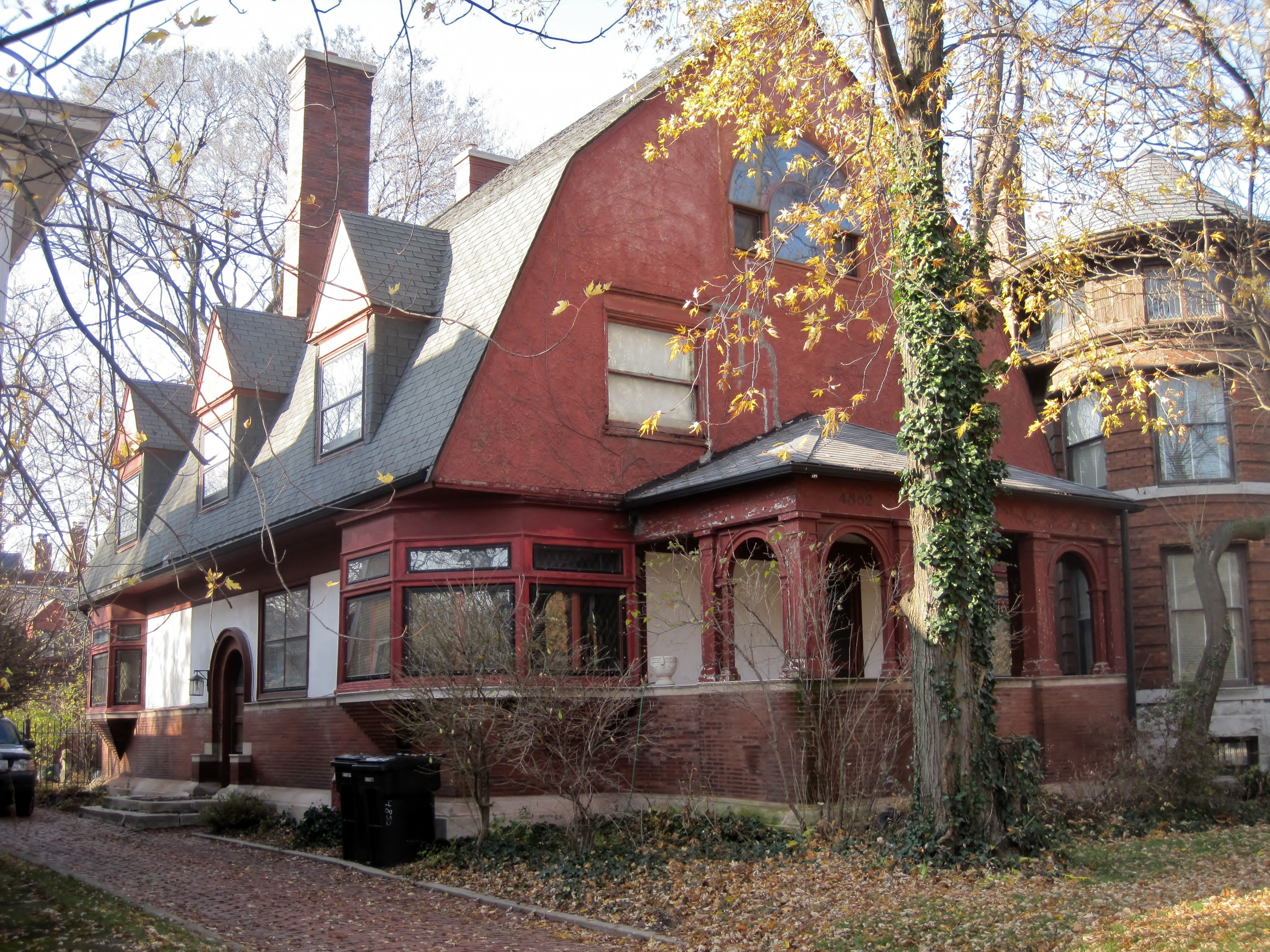
Distinctive gambrel roof on the Warren McArthur House in Kenwood, Chicago, designed by Frank Lloyd Wright in 1892.

In the American colonies both the Dutch and Germans plus others along the Rhine region of Europe contributed to the Dutch fashion. Three easily accessible examples of Dutch (Netherlands or German) architecture can be seen: 1 1/2-story 1676 Jan Martense Schenck House in the Brooklyn Museum, 1 1/2-story 1730s Schenck House located in the "Old Beth Page" Historic Village, and the two-story 1808 Gideon Tucker House at No. 2 White St at Broadway in Manhattan. All three represent distinctly Dutch (Netherlands-German) styles using "H-frame" for construction, wood clapboard, large rooms, double hung windows, off set front entry doors, sharply sloped roofs, and large "open" fireplaces. Often there is a hipped roof, or curved eaves, but not always. Barns in the Dutch-German fashion share the same attributes.

Examples of hipped and not hipped roofs can be seen on the three examples provided above. The 1676 and 1730 Schenck houses are examples of Dutch houses with "H-frame" construction but without the "hipped" roof. The 1730 Schenck house has the distinctive "curved eaves". Hips can be in a few different styles. The more common being a Mansard as known in Europe or "gambrel" as known in American English, both having two slopes on at least two sides. Gideon Tucker (though an older Englishman) chose to build his house with a gambrel roof and in an urban Dutch-German fashion.

== Revival in the 20th century ==
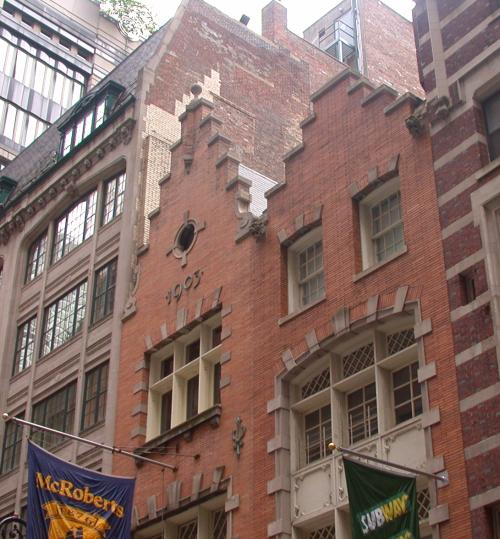
Stepped gables on early 20th-century Dutch Revival buildings on S William Street in Lower Manhattan recall the Dutch origins of the city.

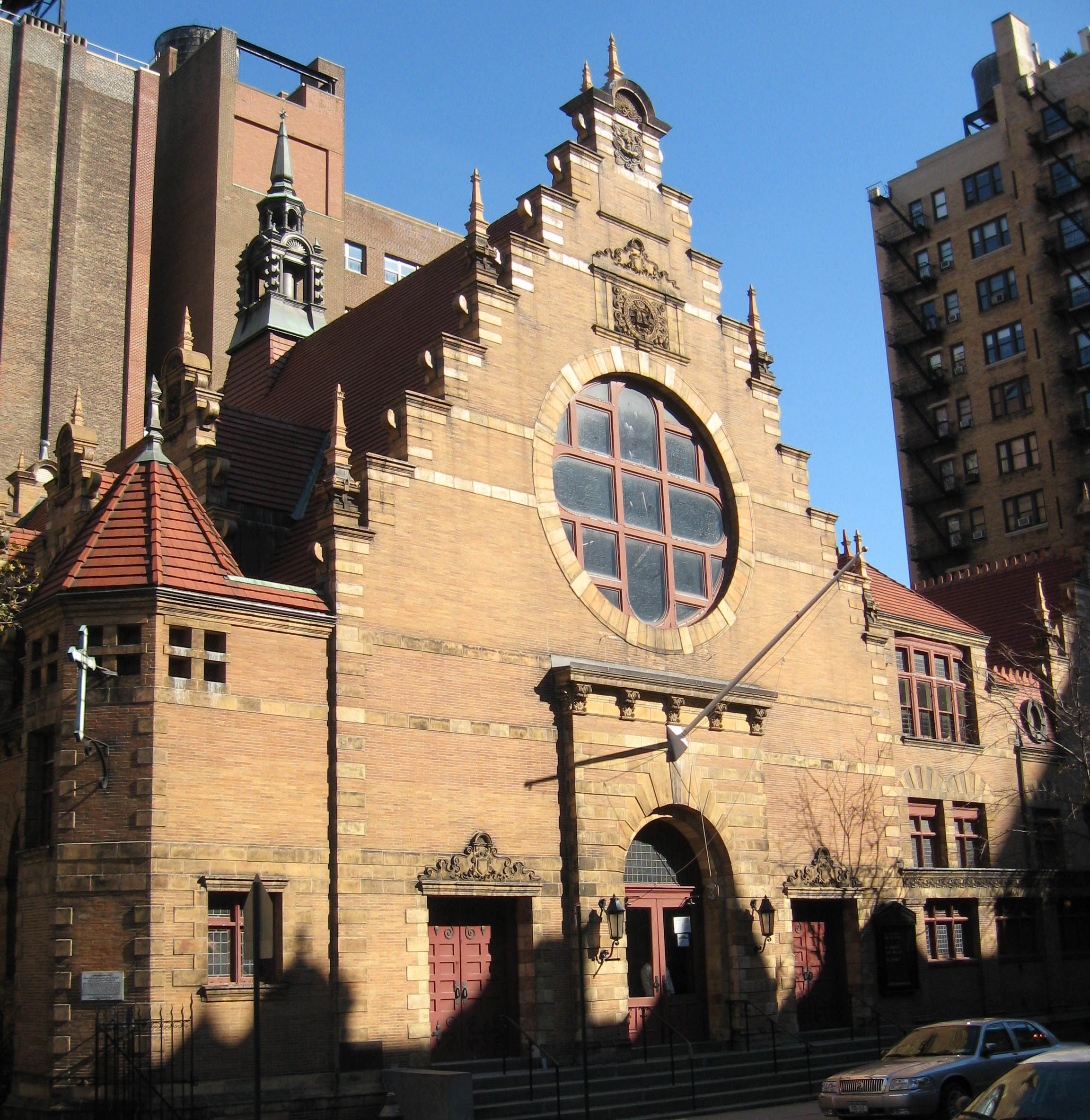
West End Collegiate Church at West 77th Street

Beginning in the late 19th century, America began to look back romantically upon its colonial roots and the country started reflecting this nostalgia in its architecture. Within this Colonial Revival, one of the more popular designs was a redux of features of the original Dutch Colonial. The term "Dutch Colonial" appeared sometime between 1920 and 1925.

Within the context of architectural history, the more modern style is specifically defined as "Dutch Colonial Revival" to distinguish it from the original Dutch Colonial. However, this style was popularly known simply as Dutch Colonial, and this continues to be the case today. In New York, for instance, the actual 17th-century colonial architecture of New Amsterdam has completely vanished (lost in the fires of 1776 and 1835), leaving only archaeological remnants.

Up and through the 1930s, Dutch Colonials were most popular in the Northeast. While the original design was always reflected, some details were updated such as the primary entryway moving from the end to the long side of the house. The more modern versions also varied a great deal with regard to materials used, architectural details, and size. For example, one Dutch Colonial might be a small two-story structure of 1,400 square feet (130 m^{2}) with dormers bearing shed-like overhangs, while another larger example would have three stories and a grand entrance adorned with a transom and sidelights.

== Buildings ==
Examples of urban style of Dutch Colonial Revival architecture can be found in Manhattan, New York. 57 Stone Street was rebuilt in 1903 by C. P. H. Gilbert at the behest of the owner Amos F. Eno. The buildings to the back on South William Street 13–23 also were reconstructed in the Dutch revival style, evoking New Amsterdam with the use of red brick as building material and the features of stepped gables. Stepped gables on early 20th-century Dutch Revival buildings on S William Street in Lower Manhattan recall the Dutch origins of the city. The area was declared a historic district in 1996 by the New York City Landmarks Preservation Commission.

The Children's Aid Society had a number of its centers constructed in the Dutch colonial revival style, such as the Rhinelander Children's Center at 350 East 88th Street, the 6th Street Industrial School on 630 East 6th Street, the Fourteenth Ward Industrial School at 256–258 Mott Street, and the Elizabeth Home for Girls at 307 East 12th Street.

West End Avenue saw a large number of buildings designed in the Dutch colonial revival style. The West End Collegiate Church was modelled after the Vleeshal at the Grote Markt in Haarlem.

Further examples in New York City are the former George S. Bowdoin Stable at 149 East 38th Street, 119 West 81st Street, and 18 West 37th Street.

An industrial example was the Wallabout Market, designed by the architect William Tubby and constructed in 1894–1896. They were demolished in 1941 during World War II.

Sunnyside in Tarrytown, New York, was partly constructed in Dutch Colonial revival.

112 Ocean Avenue, a Dutch Colonial home in Amityville, New York, became notorious when Ronald Defeo Jr. murdered his family there. The house's subsequent owners, George and Kathy Lutz, claimed to have been driven out of it by paranormal phenomena. Their alleged experiences became the basis for the book The Amityville Horror.

== Images ==
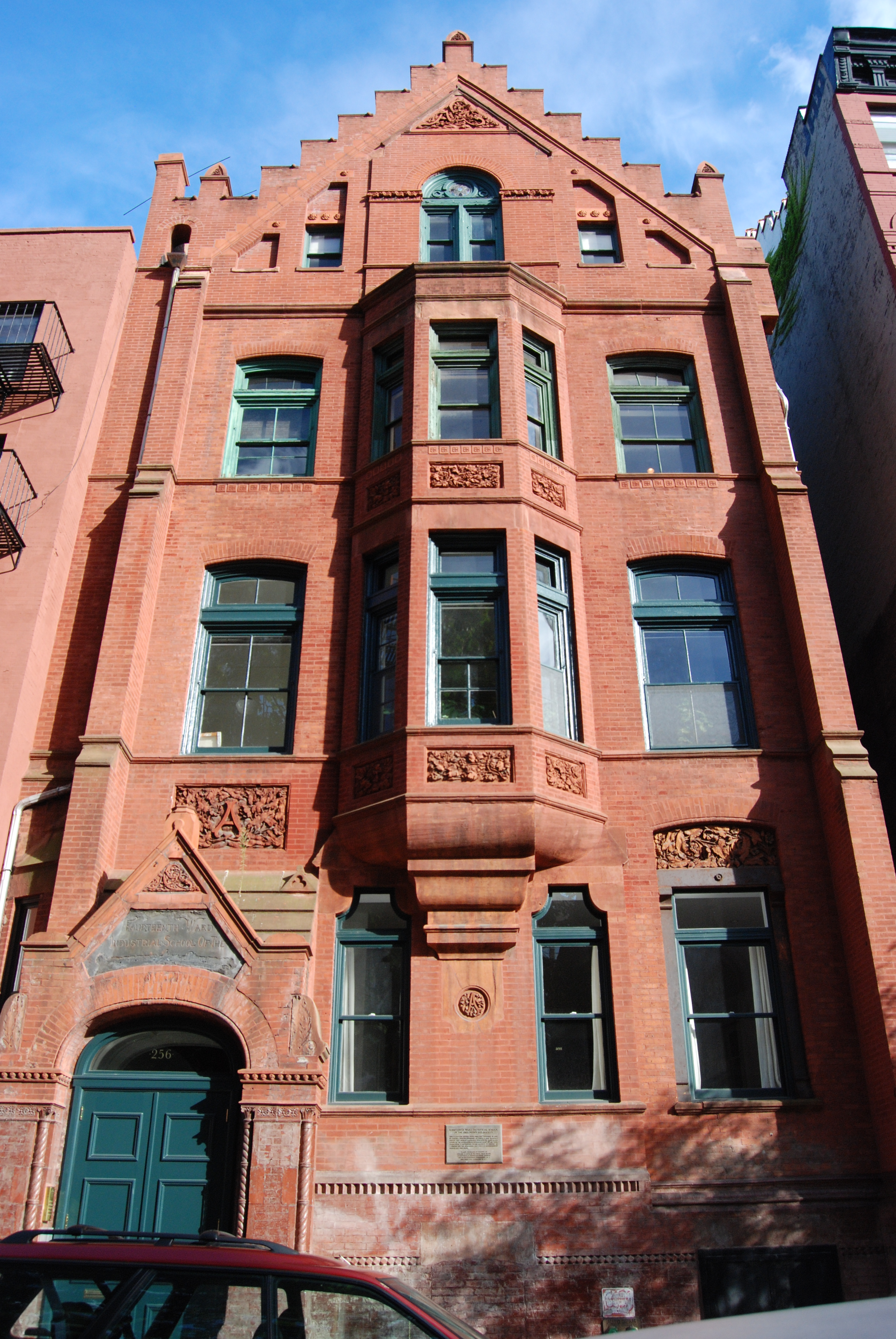
Fourteenth Ward Industrial School of the Children's Aid Society at 256–258 Mott Street in New York, 1888–1889

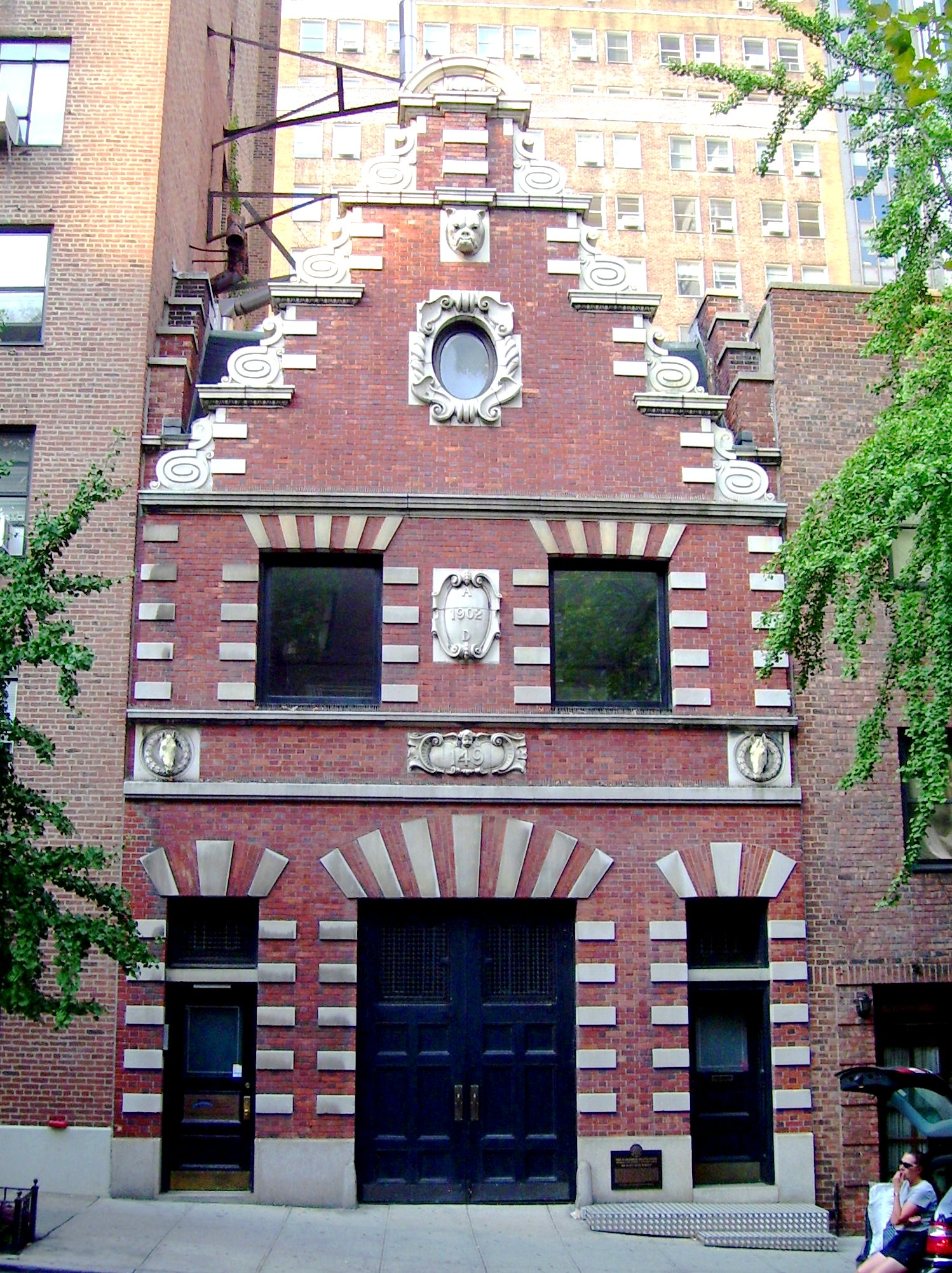
George S. Bowdoin Stable at 149 East 38th Street in New York, 1902

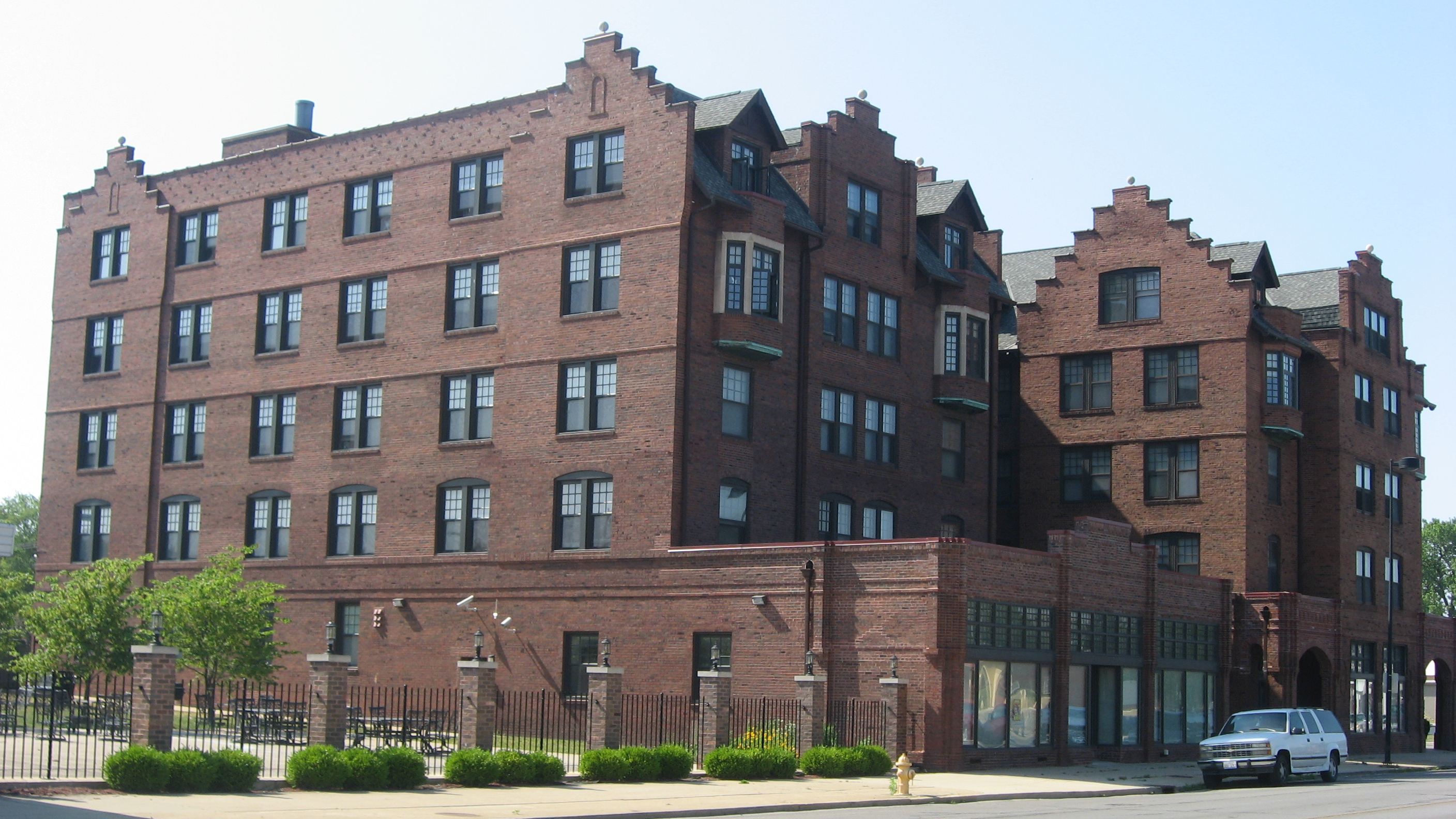
Holland Apartments, 324–326 N. Vermilion Street in Danville, Illinois, 1906

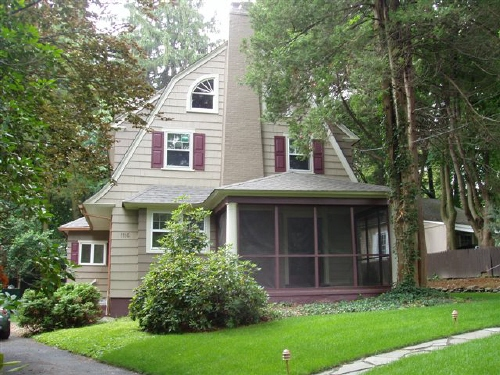
House in Plainfield, New Jersey

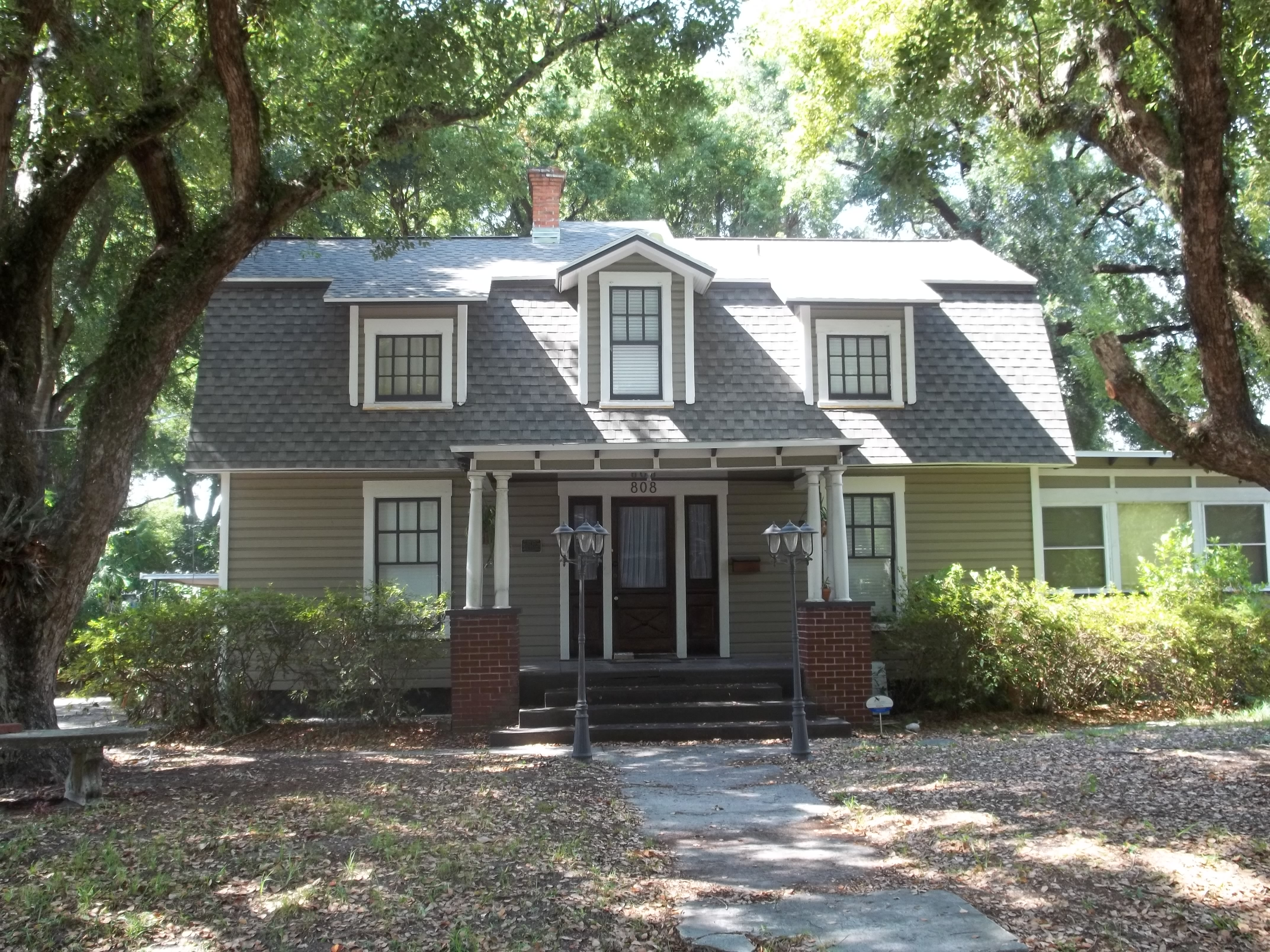
William E. Curtis House in Tampa, Florida, 1905–1906

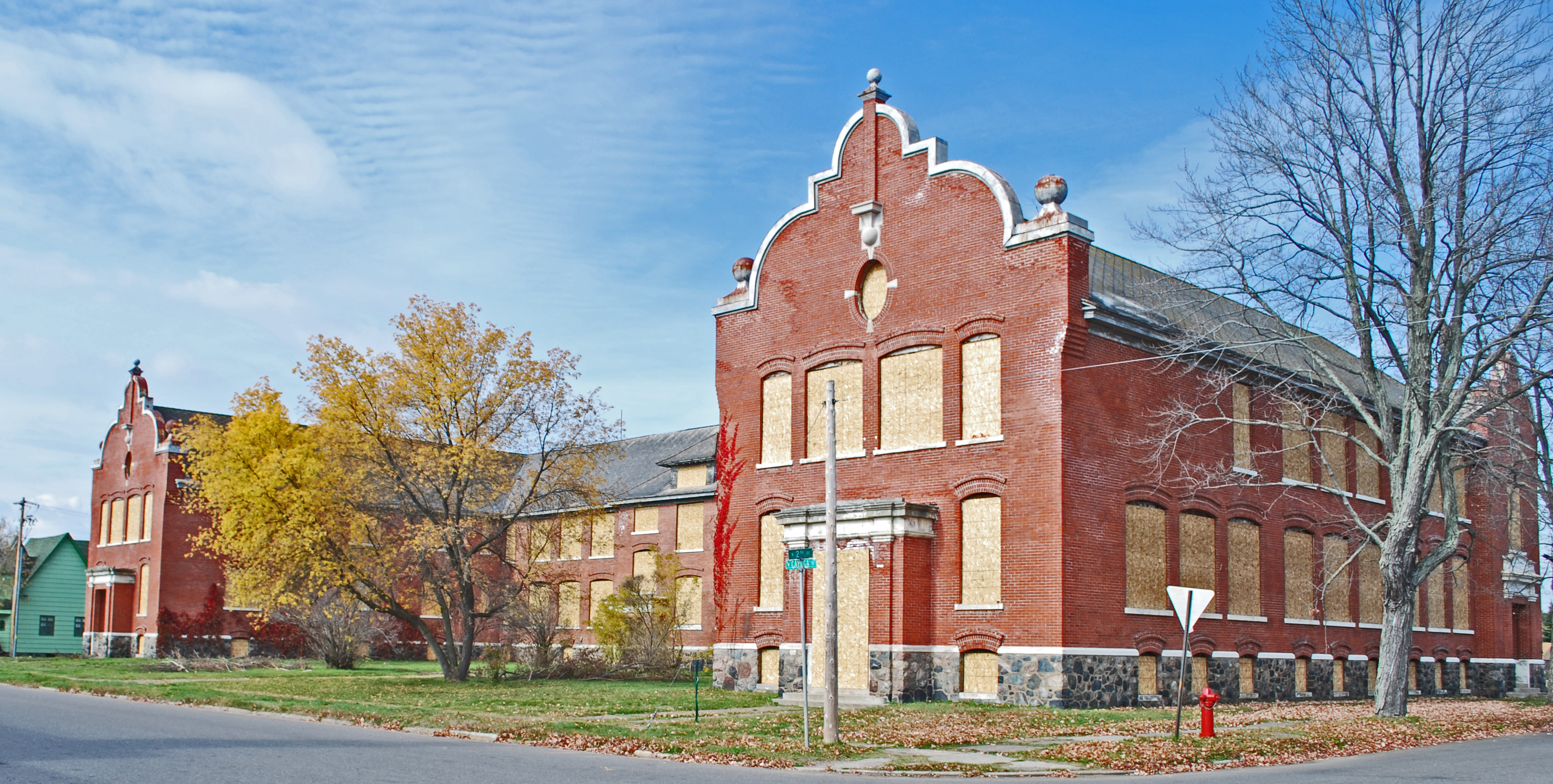
Central School (Iron River, Michigan), 1911–1919

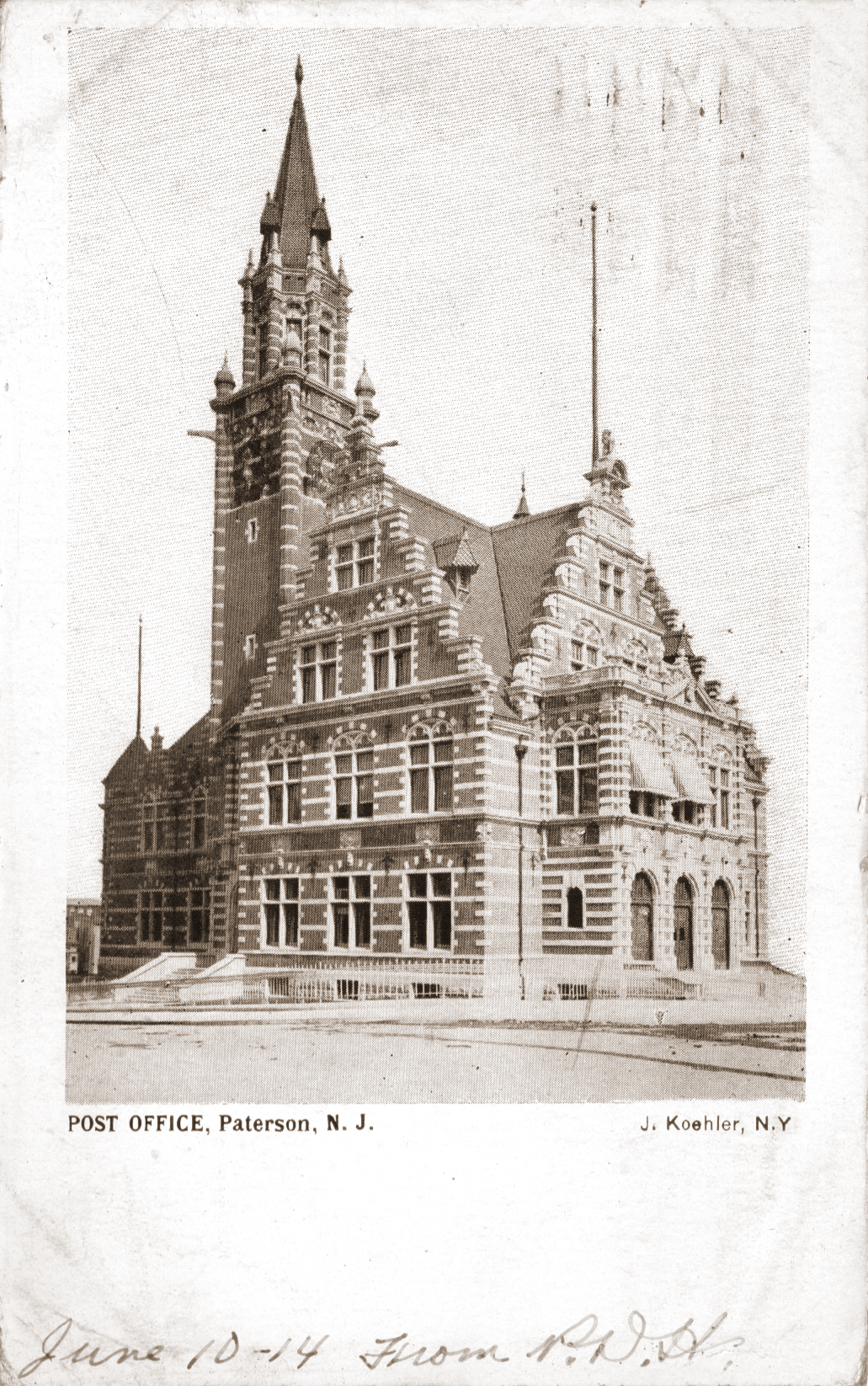
Passaic County US Customs Office and Post Office, 1899 in Paterson, New Jersey

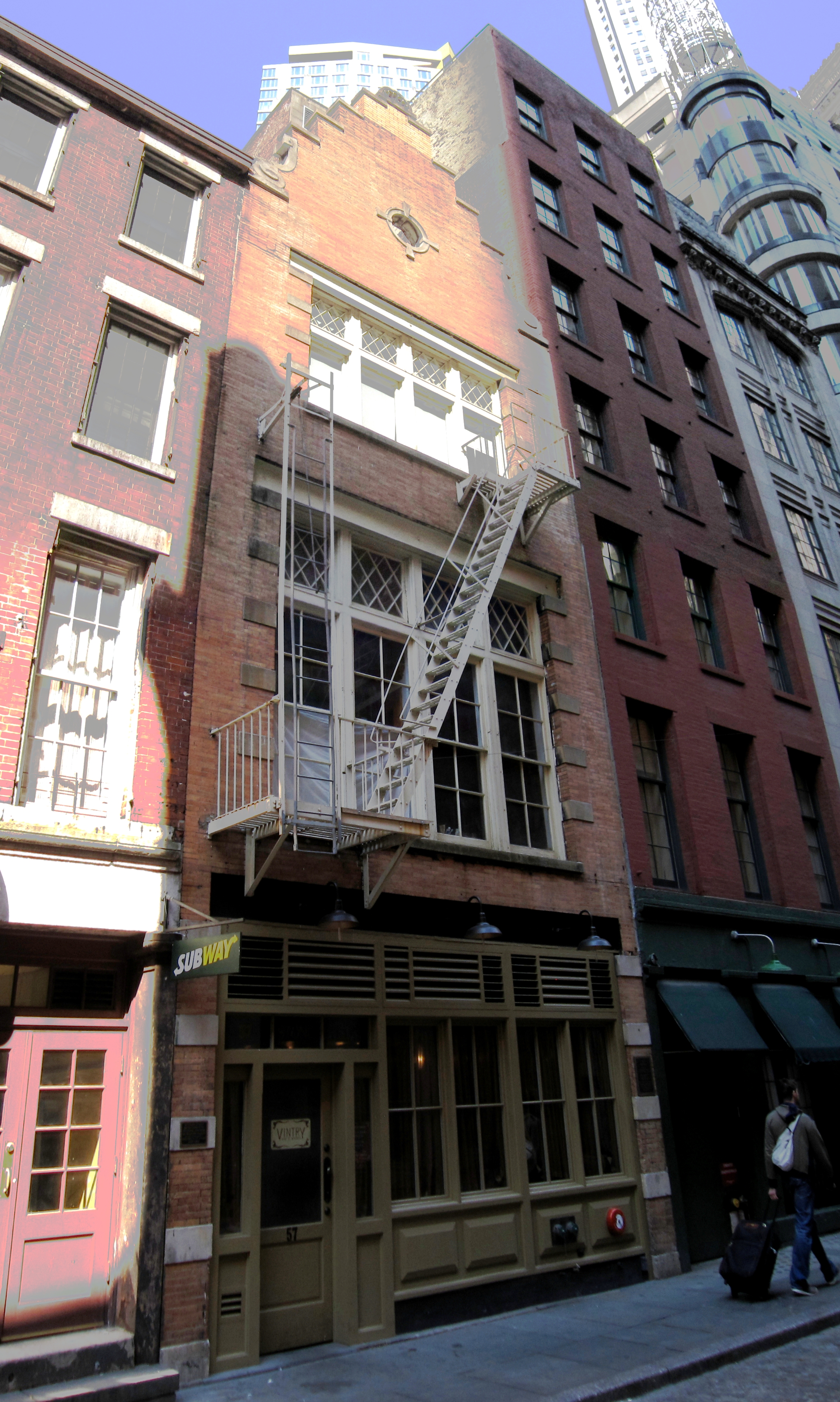
57 Stone Street, NYC

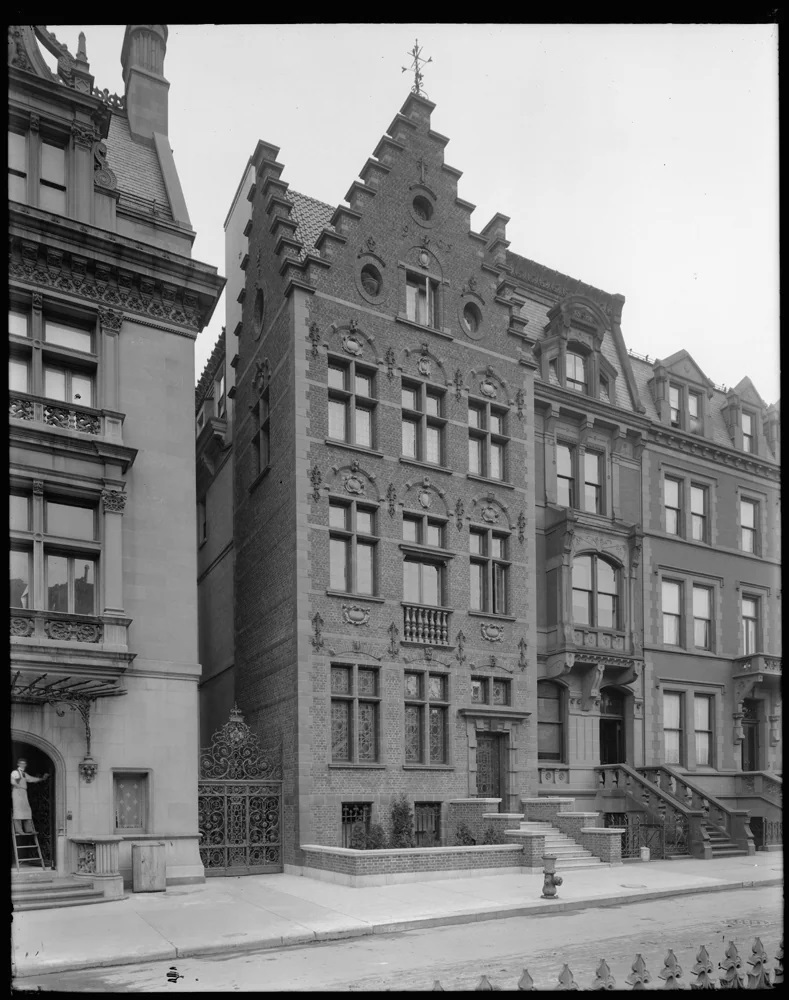
Flagler Residence, 1905, demolished in 1953

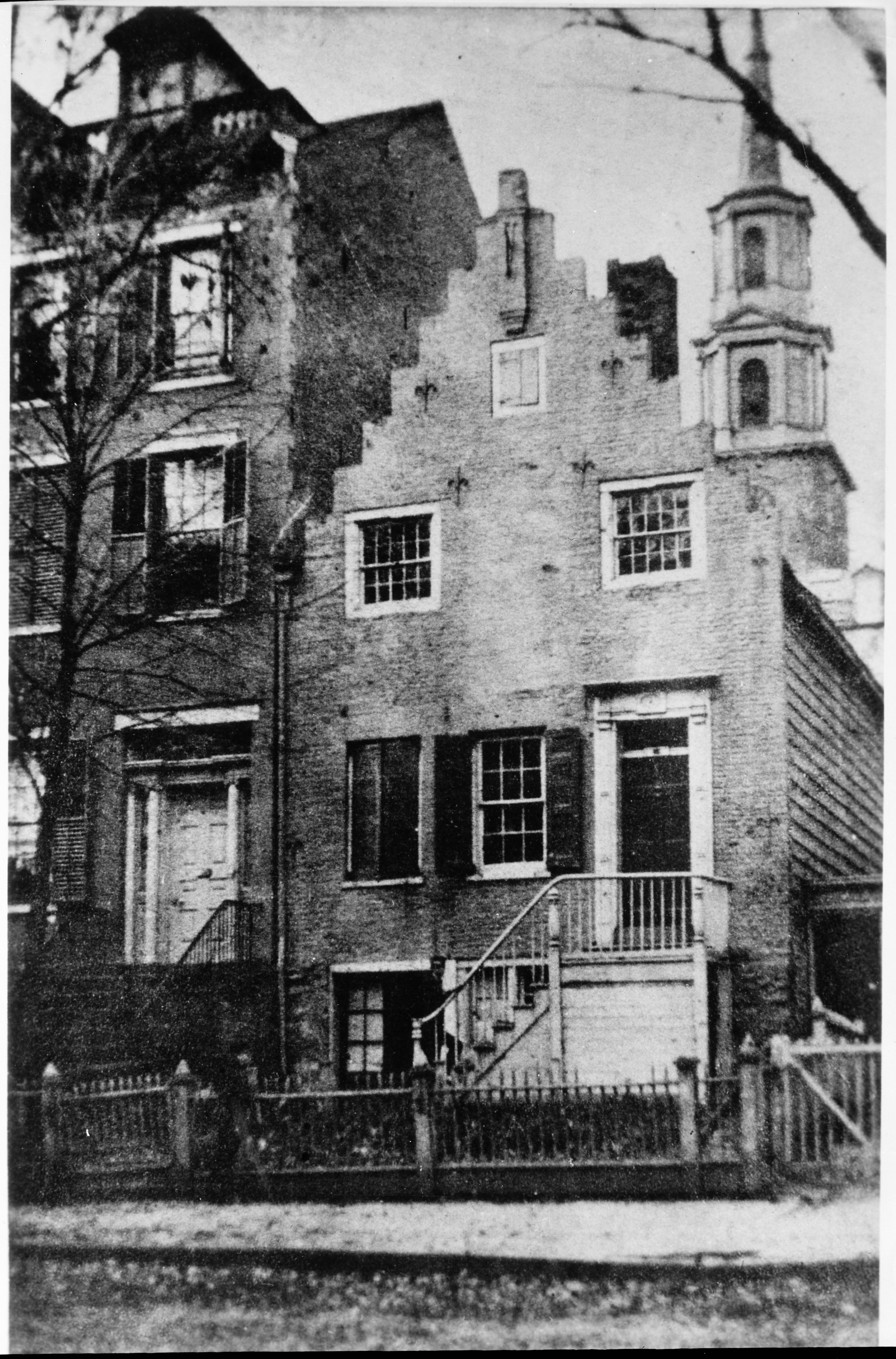
Widow Sturtevant House in Albany, c1933

== See also ==
- Cape Dutch architecture
- Dutch architecture
- New Classical architecture
