= Rogers Peet =

Men's clothing company founded in 1874

- Company type: Private
- Industry: Retail
- Founded: November 6, 1874
- Founder: Rogers Peet
- Defunct: mid-1980s
- Headquarters: New York City, United States
- Products: Men's clothing

Rogers Peet was a men's clothing company founded on November 6, 1874. Rogers Peet introduced several innovations into the men's wear business: they attached tags to garments giving fabric composition, they marked garments with price tags (the established practice was to haggle), they offered customers their money back if not satisfied, and they used illustrations of specific merchandise in their advertising. By 1877, it was headed by William R. H. Martin.

The company's reputation was strong enough that they were referenced in popular songs. In 1919, Cole Porter wrote about them in the song "I Introduced" from Hitchy-Koo of 1919, from the point of view of a man who claims to have "presented Mister Peet to Mister Rogers," having also introduced several other famous partnerships such as Morgan/Hajes, Lord & Taylor and Moet & Chandon. The song "Marry the Man Today" from the 1950 musical Guys and Dolls mentioned Rogers Peet as one of the better things in life, “respectable, conservative and clean” alongside Reader's Digest, the orchestra leader Guy Lombardo, and Ovaltine.

The last Rogers Peet store closed in the mid-1980s. One of their green delivery vehicles can be seen in a street scene in the 1961 film Breakfast at Tiffany's.
