= Peat (surname) =

Peat is an English and Scottish patronymic surname. People with the name Peat include:

- Andrus Peat (born 1993), American football player
- Arthur Peat (1940–2012), English footballer
- Charles Peat (1892–1979), British politician and cricketer
- F. David Peat (1938–2017), British physicist and author
- Harold R. Peat (1893–1960), Canadian soldier and author
- Jeremy Peat (born 1945), British economist
- Koa Peat (born 2007), American basketball player
- Lindsay Peat (born 1980), Irish rugby union player
- Louisa Watson Small Peat (1883–1952), Irish lecturer and writer
- Marion Todd Peat (born 1964), former American football player
- Mark Peat (born 1982), Scottish footballer
- Michael Peat (born 1949), British accountant and former private secretary to Charles, Prince of Wales
- Nathan Neil Martin Peat (born 1982), English footballer
- Neville Peat, New Zealand author and photographer
- Stephen Peat (1980–2024), Canadian ice hockey player
- Steve Peat (born 1974), English mountain biker
- William Barclay Peat (1852–1936), British accountant

== See also ==
- Peet § Surname
- Peete, surname
- Pete (surname)
