= Bob Diamond =

Bobby or Bob Diamond may refer to:

== People ==
- Bob Diamond (actor) (1943–2019), American actor and lawyer, also known as Bobby Diamond and Robert Diamond
- Bob Diamond (banker) (born 1951), Anglo-American business executive
- Bob Diamond (engineer) (1959–2021), American trolley advocate responsible for rediscovery of the Atlantic Avenue Tunnel in Brooklyn in 1980

== Fictional characters ==
- Bob Diamond (comics), Marvel Comics character since 1974
- Bob Diamond, played by Rip Torn in 1991 American film Defending Your Life

== See also ==
- Bobby Dimond (1930–2020), Australian rugby league footballer
