= Peat (disambiguation) =

Peat is an accumulation of decayed vegetation matter.

Peat may also refer to:

- Peat (surname), people with the surname Peat
- Peat Island, New South Wales, Australia
- Peat Marwick, accounting firm, predecessor of KPMG

== See also ==
- Peet (disambiguation)
- Pete (disambiguation)
