= Pete =

Pete or Petes or variation, may refer to:

== People ==
- Pete (given name)
- Pete (nickname)
- Pete (surname)

=== Fictional characters ===
- Pete (Disney), a cartoon character in the Mickey Mouse universe
- Pete the Cat, the main character from a children’s book series of the same name.
- Pete the Pup (a.k.a. 'Petey'), a character (played by several dogs) in Hal Roach's Our Gang comedies

== Places ==
- Pete, Zanzibar, a village in Tanzania
- Pete, the Hungarian name for Petea village, Dorolț Commune, Satu Mare County, Romania
- Petes, Gotland, Visby, Gotland, Sweden
- Petes Hill, a summit in the Adirondack Mountains, New York State, USA
- Petes Creek, a tributary of the Sacandaga River, located in New York State, USA

== Sports and athletics ==
- The Pete, Petersen Events Center, athletics complex and basketball arena on the campus of the University of Pittsburgh
- Pete the Penguin, one of the two mascots of Youngstown State University
- Purdue Pete, bookstore logo turned unofficial mascot of Purdue University
- A member of the Peterborough Petes junior ice hockey team

== In the military ==
- Pete, Allied reporting name for the Japanese World War II Mitsubishi F1M seaplane
- USS Pete (SP-596), a United States Navy patrol boat in commission from 1917 to 1918

== Other uses ==
- "Pete" (Red Dwarf), a two-part episode of the television series Red Dwarf
- Pete, nickname for Peterbilt trucks in the trucking industry
- Pete, a common name in Indonesia for Parkia speciosa, the stink bean
- PETE, an abbreviation of polyethylene terephthalate, a polymer
- Pete (Theodore Roosevelt's dog)
- Pete (band), an American post-grunge and alternative metal band

== See also ==
- , including many people with the forename Pete
- St. Pete, St. Pete Co., Fla., USA
- St. Pete Beach, St. Pete Co., Fla., USA
- Peat, an accumulation of partially decayed vegetation matter
- Peat (disambiguation)
- Peet (disambiguation)
- Piet (disambiguation)
- Peter (disambiguation)
- Peters (disambiguation)
- Peterborough (disambiguation)
- Petersberg (disambiguation)
- Petersburg (disambiguation)
- Saint Petersburg (disambiguation)
- Pit (disambiguation)
