= Track 61 =

Track 61 may refer

- Track 61 (Boston)
- Track 61 (New York City)
