= Avenue I station =

New York City Subway station in Brooklyn

Avenue I
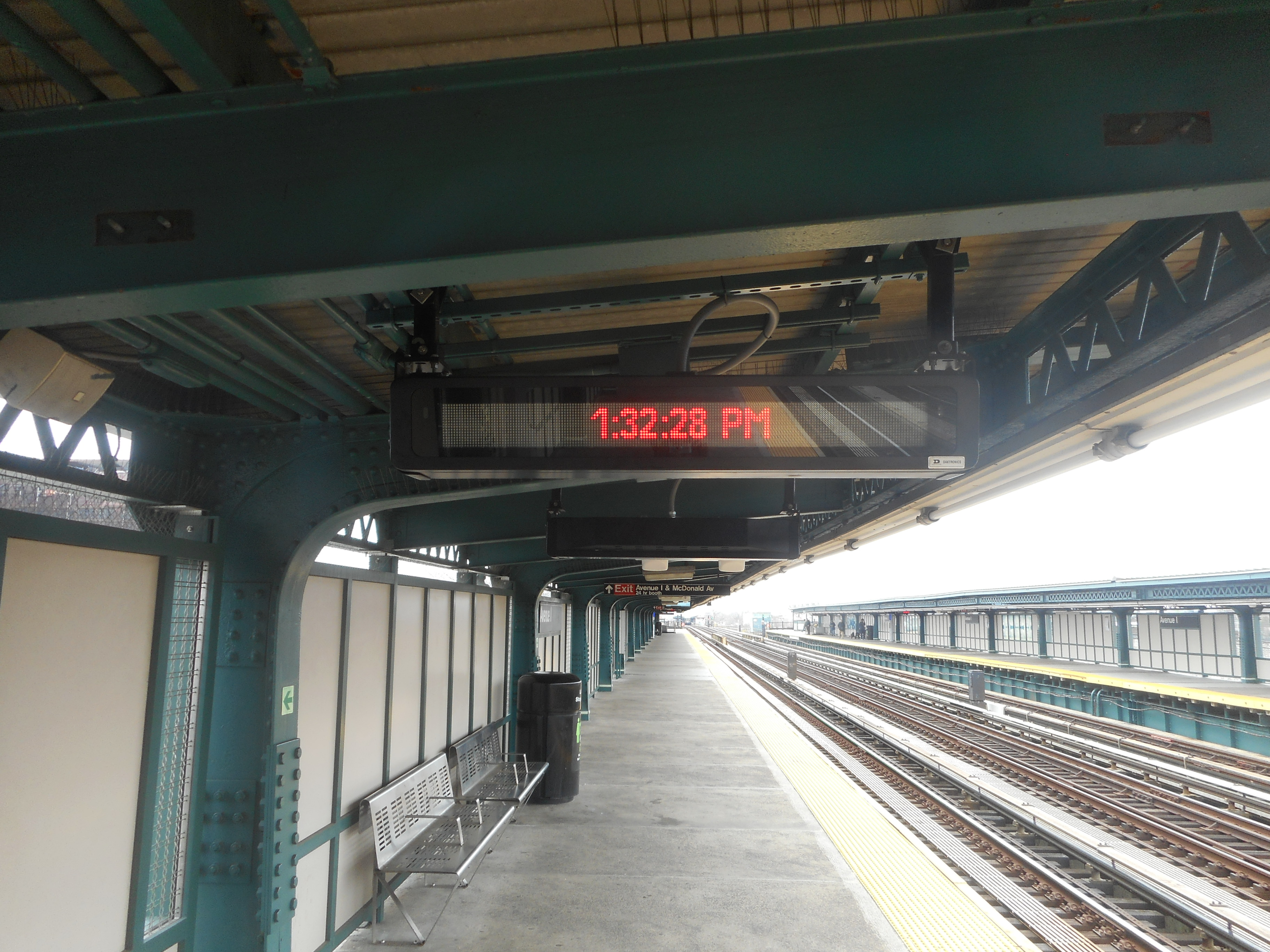
- Southbound platform

Station statistics
- Address: Avenue I & McDonald Avenue; Brooklyn, New York
- Borough: Brooklyn
- Locale: Midwood, Mapleton
- Coordinates: 40°37′33.32″N 73°58′34.39″W
- Division: B (IND, formerly BMT)
- Line: IND Culver Line; BMT Culver Line (formerly)
- Services: F (all times) <F> (two rush hour trains, peak direction)
- Transit: NYCT Bus: B11
- Structure: Elevated
- Platforms: 2 side platforms
- Tracks: 3 (2 in regular service)

Other information
- Opened: March 16, 1919 (107 years ago)
- Accessible: No; under construction
- Former/other names: Parkville

Traffic
- 2025: 341,541 ▼2.3%
- Rank: 408 out of 423
Services
Preceding station	New York City Subway	Following station
18th Avenue F <F> toward Jamaica–179th Street	Local	Bay Parkway F <F> toward Coney Island–Stillwell Avenue
Location
Location within New York City Subway
Location within New York City
Location within New York
Track layout
Street map
Station service legend
Symbol	Description
Stops all times	Stops all times
Stops rush hours in the peak direction only (limited service)	Stops rush hours in the peak direction only (limited service)
Stops weekdays and weekday late nights	Stops weekdays and weekday late nights

The Avenue I station is a local station on the IND Culver Line of the New York City Subway. Located at the intersection of Avenue I and McDonald Avenue in Midwood, Brooklyn, it is served by the F train at all times and the <F> train during rush hours in the peak direction.

== History ==
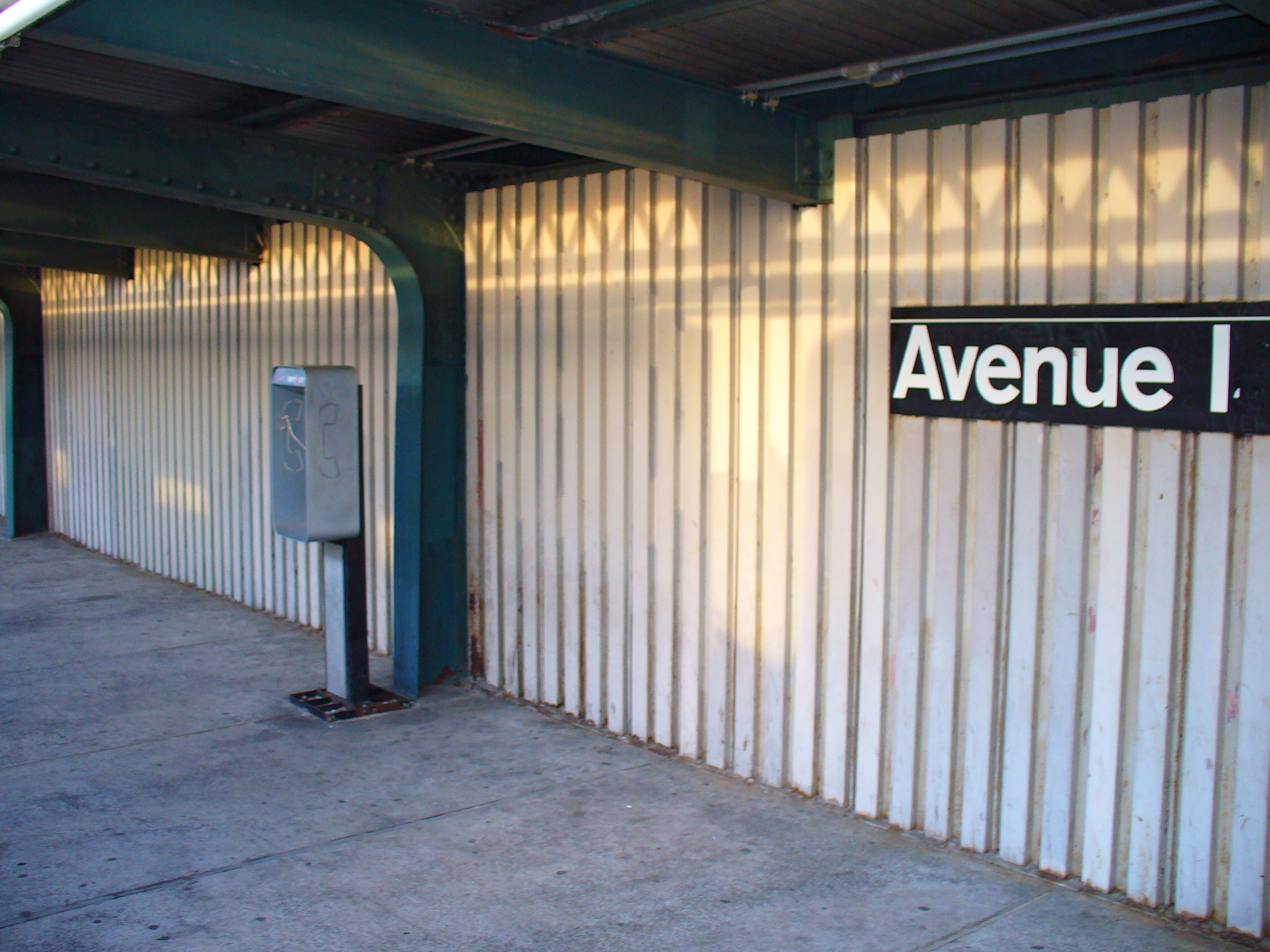
Platform prior to renovation

This station opened at 3:00 a.m. on March 16, 1919, as part of the opening of the first section of the BMT Culver Line. The initial section began at the Ninth Avenue station and ended at the Kings Highway station. The line was operated as a branch of the Fifth Avenue Elevated line, with a free transfer at Ninth Avenue to the West End Line into the Fourth Avenue Subway. The opening of the line resulted in reduced travel times between Manhattan and Kings Highway. Construction on the line began in 1915, and cost a total of $3.3 million. Trains from this station began using the Fourth Avenue Subway to the Nassau Street Loop in Lower Manhattan when that line opened on May 30, 1931. The Fifth Avenue Elevated was closed on May 31, 1940, and elevated service ceased stopping here. On October 30, 1954, the connection between the IND South Brooklyn Line at Church Avenue and the BMT Culver Line at Ditmas Avenue opened. With the connection completed, all service at the stations on the former BMT Culver Line south of Ditmas Avenue, including this one, were from then on served by IND trains.

From June 1968 to 1987, express service on the elevated portion of the line from Church Avenue to Kings Highway operated in the peak direction (to Manhattan AM; to Brooklyn PM), with some F trains running local and some running express. During this time period, this station was used as a local station. Express service ended in 1987, largely due to budget constraints and complaints from passengers at local stations. Express service on the elevated Culver Line was ended due to necessary structural work, but never restored.

From June 7, 2016, to May 1, 2017, the southbound platform at this station was closed for renovations. The Manhattan-bound platform was closed for a longer period of time, from May 22, 2017 until July 30, 2018.

In 2019, the Metropolitan Transportation Authority announced that this station would become ADA-accessible as part of the agency's 2020–2024 Capital Program. The MTA received $254 million from the Federal Transit Administration in 2023 for accessibility upgrades to four subway stations, including the Avenue I station. Work on new elevators began in December 2024.

Plans for the Interborough Express, a light rail line using the Bay Ridge Branch right of way, were announced in 2023. As part of the project, a light rail station at McDonald Avenue has been proposed next to the existing Avenue I subway station.

== Station layout ==
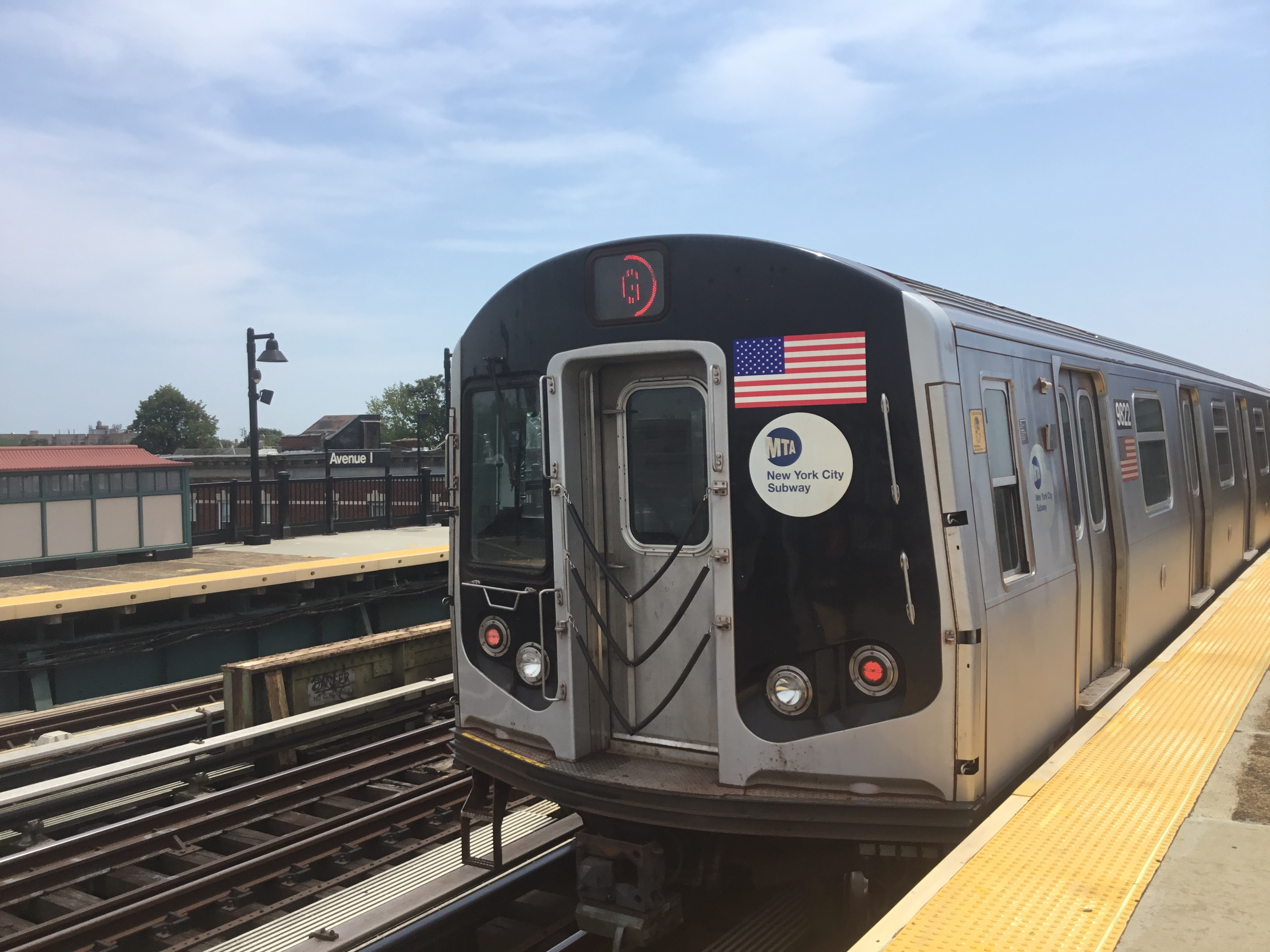
Rerouted G train departing the station

This station has two side platforms and three tracks with the middle track normally unused. The two platforms have beige windscreens and green canopies that run for nearly the entire length. The north end contains black waist-level fences only.

=== Exits ===
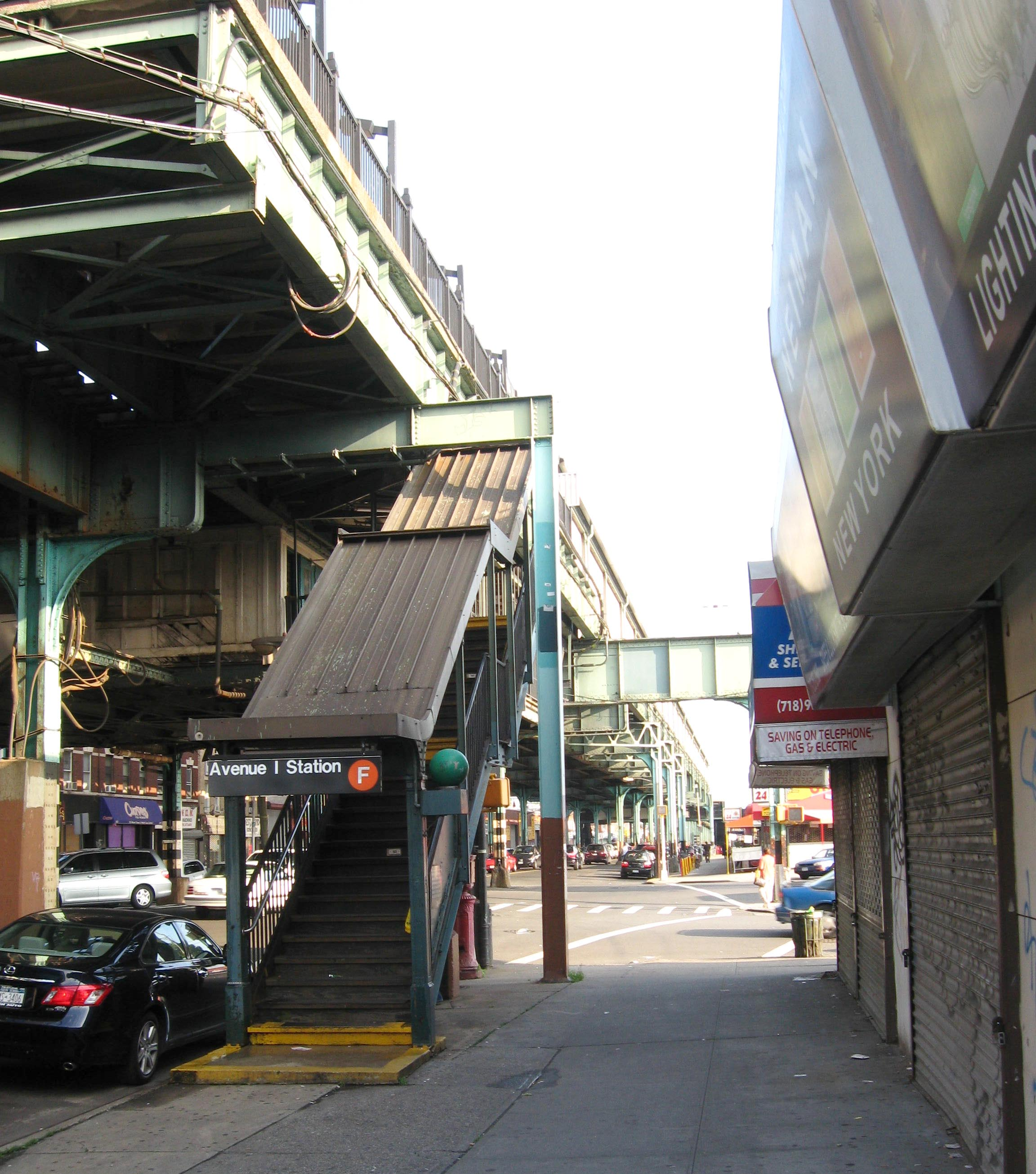
Western street stair

This station has two entrances with the full-time one at the north end. From each platform, one staircase leads down to an elevated stationhouse beneath the tracks, where a bank of turnstiles and token booth is present. Outside fare control are two street stairs to the two northern corners Avenue I and McDonald Avenue.

At the south end of the station are unstaffed exits leading to Avenue J. From each platform, a single staircase goes down to a short landing outside of a sealed mezzanine where a full-height turnstile and emergency gate provide exit from the system. Another staircase then goes down to the street. The Coney Island-bound side is exit-only while the Manhattan-bound side is HEET turnstile access. The mezzanine, now used as a station facility, once had a booth.
