= Peete =

Peete is a surname. Notable people with the surname include:

- Calvin Peete (1943–2015), American professional golfer
- Charlie Peete (1929–1956), American professional baseball player
- Louise Peete (1880–1947), American serial killer; executed in the gas chamber
- Holly Robinson Peete (born 1964), American actress and singer; wife of Rodney Peete
- Rodney Peete (born 1966), American professional football player; brother of Skip Peete
- Skip Peete (born 1963), American professional football coach; brother of Rodney Peete

== See also ==
- Peet § Surname
- Pete (surname)
