= Beach Pneumatic Transit =

Former demonstration subway line in New York City

Coordinates: 40.71332°N 74.00701°W

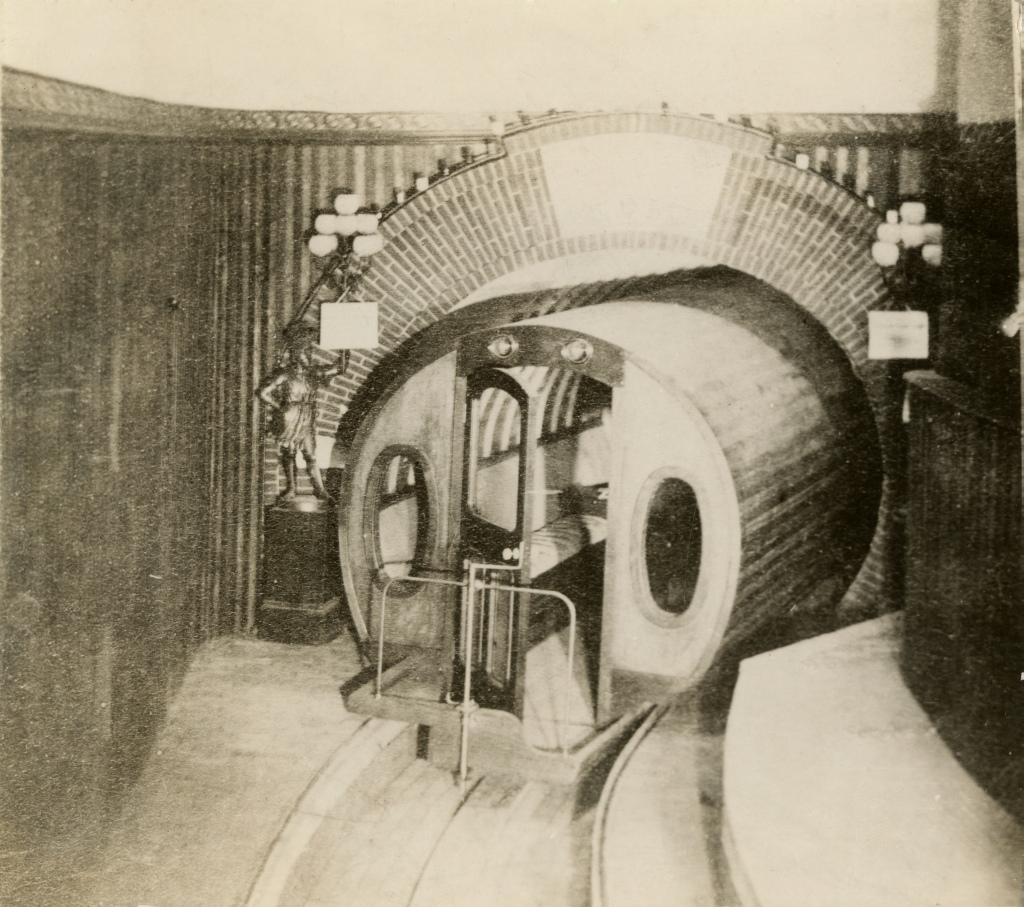
- Photograph c.1873

Overview
- Status: Demolished
- Owner: Beach Pneumatic Transit Company
- Locale: New York City, United States
- Termini: Warren Street and Broadway; Murray Street and Broadway
- Stations: 1 (Note: The terminus at Murray Street was a dead-end, not a station)

Service
- Type: Atmospheric railway
- Operator: Beach Pneumatic Transit Company

History
- Opened: February 26, 1870
- Closed: April, 1873

Technical
- Line length: 300 ft (90 m)
- Num of tracks: Single track
- Character: Underground
Route map
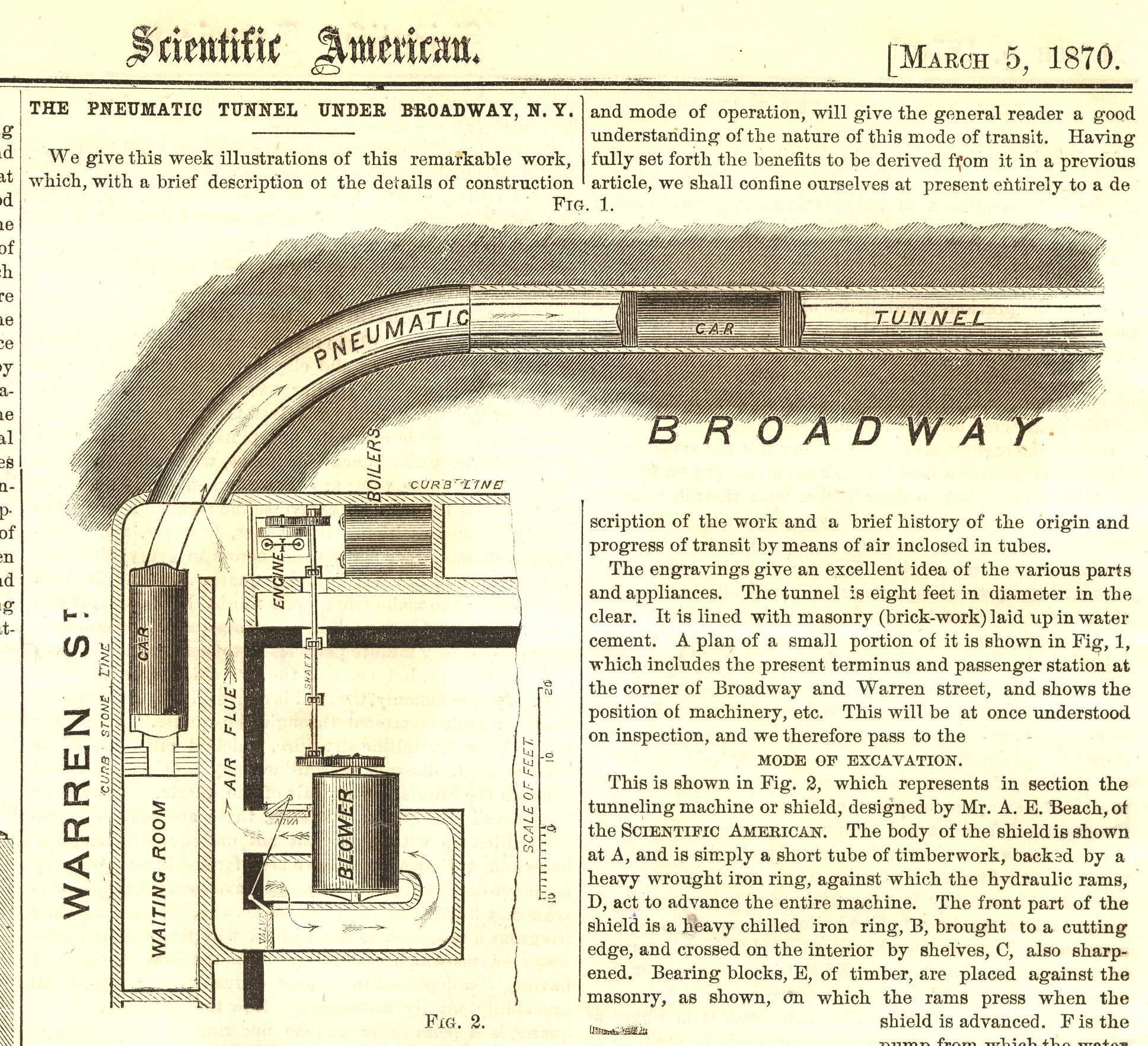

The Beach Pneumatic Transit was an early technology demonstrator for underground public transit in New York City. Running on pneumatic power, it was built by Alfred Ely Beach between 1869 and early 1870. The original terminus resided in the basement of the Rogers Peet Building in Lower Manhattan, near the old City Hall station. A one-car shuttle carried riders between the building and a dead end approximately 300 feet (91 m) away. Despite ambitious plans to construct stations along a five-mile route to Central Park, the project never expanded beyond the short demonstration track and closed in 1873.

== History ==
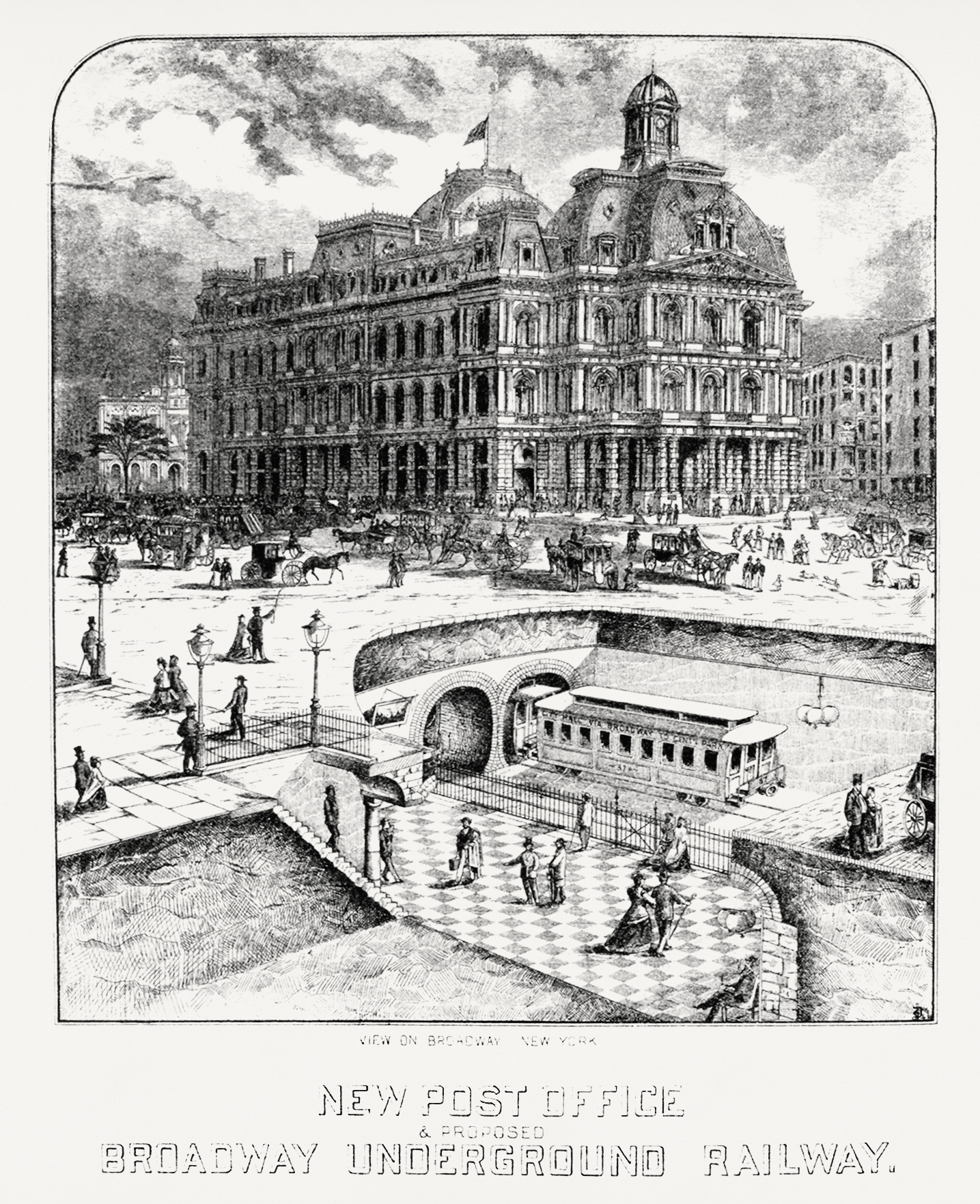
Broadway underground railway (1872), New York

Alfred Ely Beach demonstrated a model of basic pneumatic subway system, in which air pressure in the tube pushed the cars, at the American Institute Exhibition in New York in 1867. After demonstrating that the model was viable, in 1869 Beach and his Beach Pneumatic Transit Company began constructing a pneumatically powered subway line beneath Broadway. Funneled through a company he set up, Beach put up $350,000 ($8.47 million in 2025) of his own money to pay for the full-scale test project. Built with a tunneling shield, the tunnel was complete in only 58 days. Its single tunnel, 300 feet (90 m) long, 8 feet (2.4 m) in diameter, was completed in 1870 and ran under Broadway from Warren Street to Murray Street.

However, one of the city's top politicians of the day, William "Boss" Tweed, refused to support the project. With no initial political support for the project, Beach started the project by claiming he was building postal tubes. The initial permit was to install a pair of smaller postal tubes below Broadway; however, Tweed later amended the permit to allow the excavation of a single large tunnel, wherein the smaller tubes could reside.

The exact location of the tubes was determined during construction by compass and survey as well as verified by driving jointed rods of iron up through the roof of the tunnel to the pavement. The line was built as a demonstration of a pneumatic transit system, open to the public with a 25-cent fare per person. Proceeds for the admission went to the Union Home and School for Soldiers' and Sailors' Orphans. It was planned to run about 5 miles (8 km) in total, to Central Park, if it were ever completed.

For the public, the project was used as an attraction. It ran only a single car on its one-block-long track to a dead-end at its terminus, and passengers would simply ride out and back, to see what the proposed subway might be like. During its first two weeks of operation, the Beach Pneumatic Transit sold over 11,000 rides, and over 400,000 total rides in its single year of operation.

Although the public showed initial approval, Beach was delayed in getting permission to expand it due to official obstruction for various reasons. By the time he finally gained permission in 1873, public and financial support had waned, and the subway was closed down within the year. The project was shut down when a stock market crash caused investors to withdraw support. It is unclear that such a system could have been practical for a large-scale subway network.

After the project was shut down, the tunnel entrance was sealed. The station, built in part of the basement of the Rogers Peet Building, was reclaimed for other uses until the entire building was lost to fire in 1898. In 1912, workers excavating for the BMT Broadway Line (serving the present-day N, R, and W trains) dug into the old Beach tunnel, where they found the remains of the car, the tunnelling shield used during initial construction, and even the piano in the subway's waiting room. The shield was removed and donated to Cornell University, which has since lost track of its whereabouts.

The tunnel was almost completely within the limits of the Broadway Line's City Hall station, near the old City Hall station, but it is rumored that a small portion could still be accessed by a manhole on Reade Street. The New-York Historical Society commissioned a plaque honoring Alfred Beach to be placed in the City Hall station.

Although the Beach Pneumatic Transit lasted for only three years, the project gave rise to the New York pneumatic tube mail system, which was based on the request that Beach had made to Tweed and which ran until 1953.

== Design ==
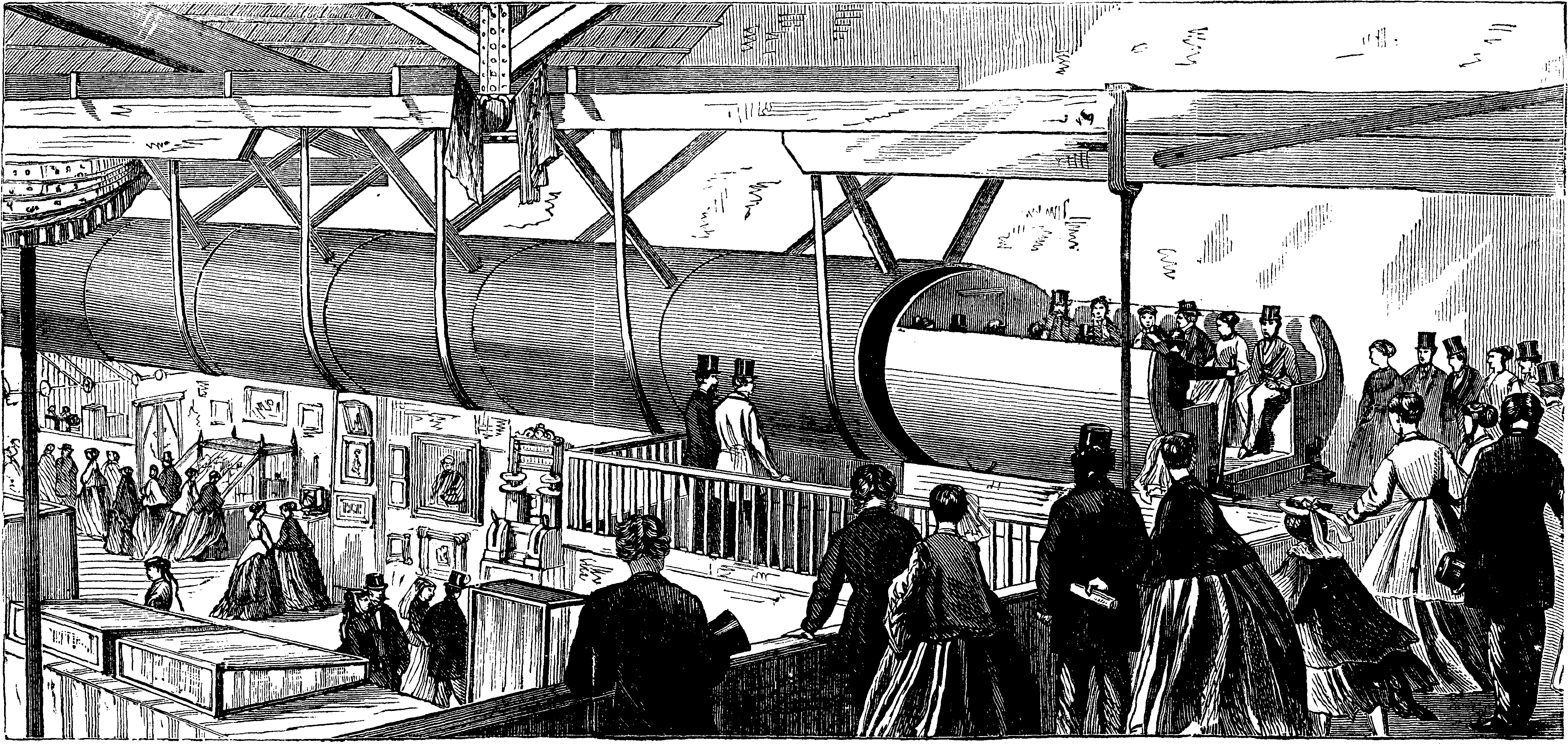
Pneumatic Dispatch showing the tube pneumatic system

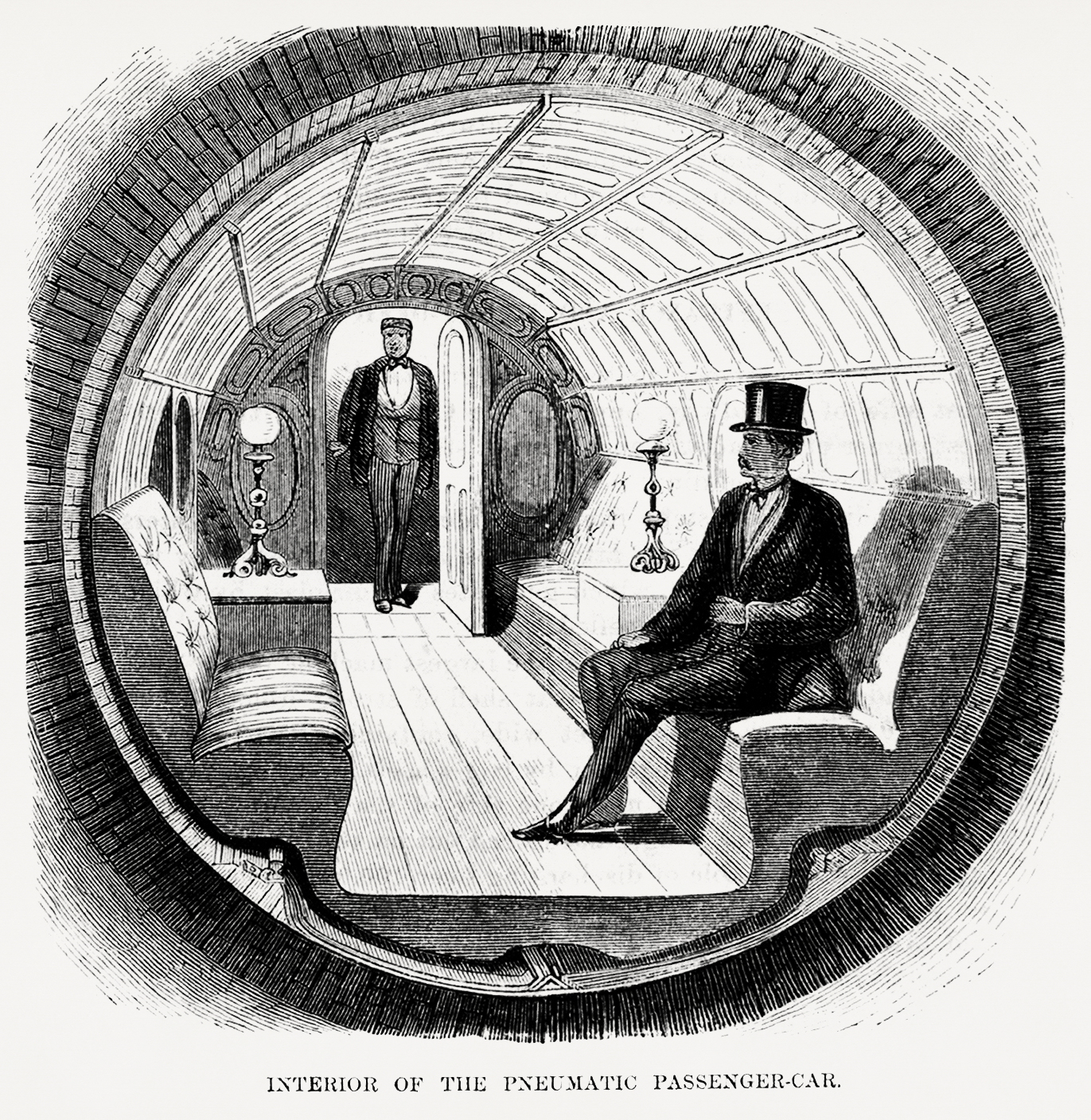
Illustration of the interior of the pneumatic passenger-car, 1872

=== Aesthetics ===
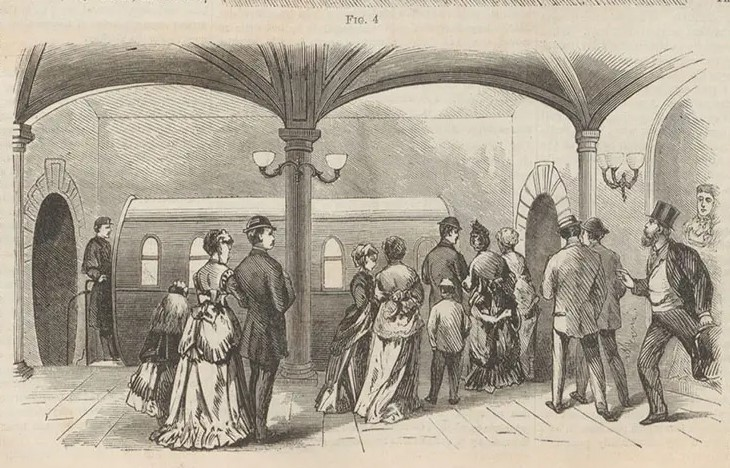
Socialites waiting in the underground station

The ornate station had frescoes and easy chairs. It was illuminated by zirconia lamps that revealed the luxurious interior. There were statues and a goldfish pond in the station that people could view while they waited to enter the ride.

=== Technical specifications ===
The car could hold 22 people, and the riders would enter the site at Devlin's Clothing Store, a well-known shop at 260 Broadway, on the southwest corner of Warren Street.

The ride was controlled by a 48-short-ton (44 t) Roots blower, nicknamed "the Western Tornado", built by Roots Patent Force Rotary Blowers (see Roots Blower Company). When the car reached the end, baffles on the blower system were reversed, and the car was pulled back by the suction.

For the tunnels, Beach used a circular design based upon Brunel's rectangular shield, which may represent the shift in design from rectangular to cylindrical. It was unclear when or who transitioned the tunneling shield design from rectangular to circular until The New York Times wrote an article describing the original Beach tunneling shield in 1870.

== Related developments ==
The Crystal Palace pneumatic railway was a similar but longer system which operated in 1864 on the grounds of the Crystal Palace in London.

== In pop culture ==
- The Beach Pneumatic Transit is featured in the direct-to-video sequel An American Tail: The Treasure of Manhattan Island and serves as a plot point of the story.
- "Sub-Rosa Subway" is a 1976 song by Klaatu which describes the subway's construction, station, and its public reception.
- In the 1989 film Ghostbusters II, a fictional pneumatic transit station and tunnel reminiscent of the Beach system is discovered by the Ghostbusters beneath First Avenue in Manhattan; the tunnel's completion date appears on-screen as 1870, the same year that the Warren-to-Murray tunnel was completed.
- In the 1990 film Teenage Mutant Ninja Turtles, the abandoned subway tunnel they live in is in reference to the pneumatic transit.
- In the 2012 series Teenage Mutant Ninja Turtles Season 2 Episode 13, the pneumatic subway system was used as a lair by the Kraang.
- In the 2015 novel, Lair of Dreams by Libba Bray (sequel to 2012's The Diviners), the tunnel serves as a main plot point. The abandoned City Hall tunnel features heavily as a setting in both the real world and the dream world.

== Gallery ==
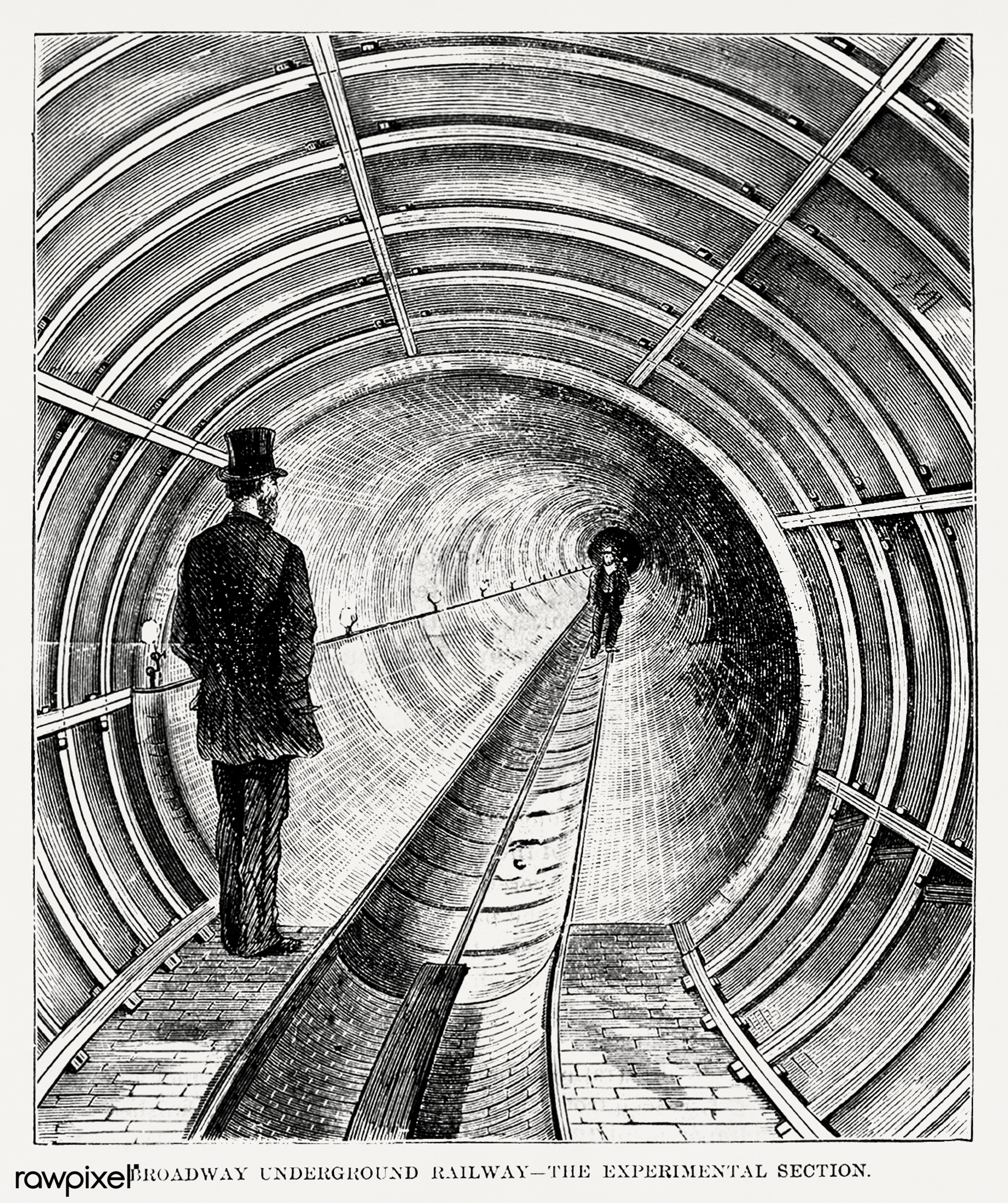

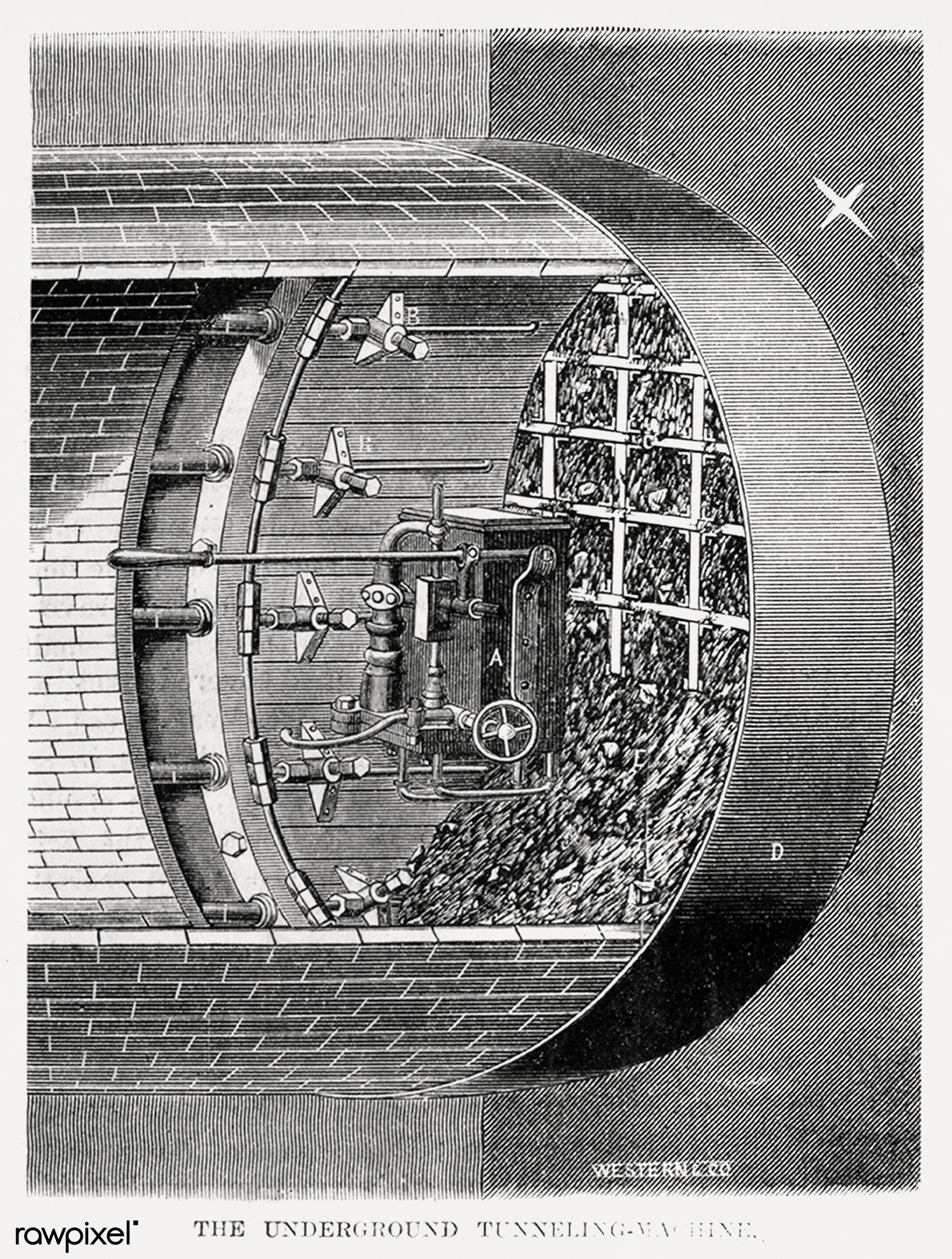

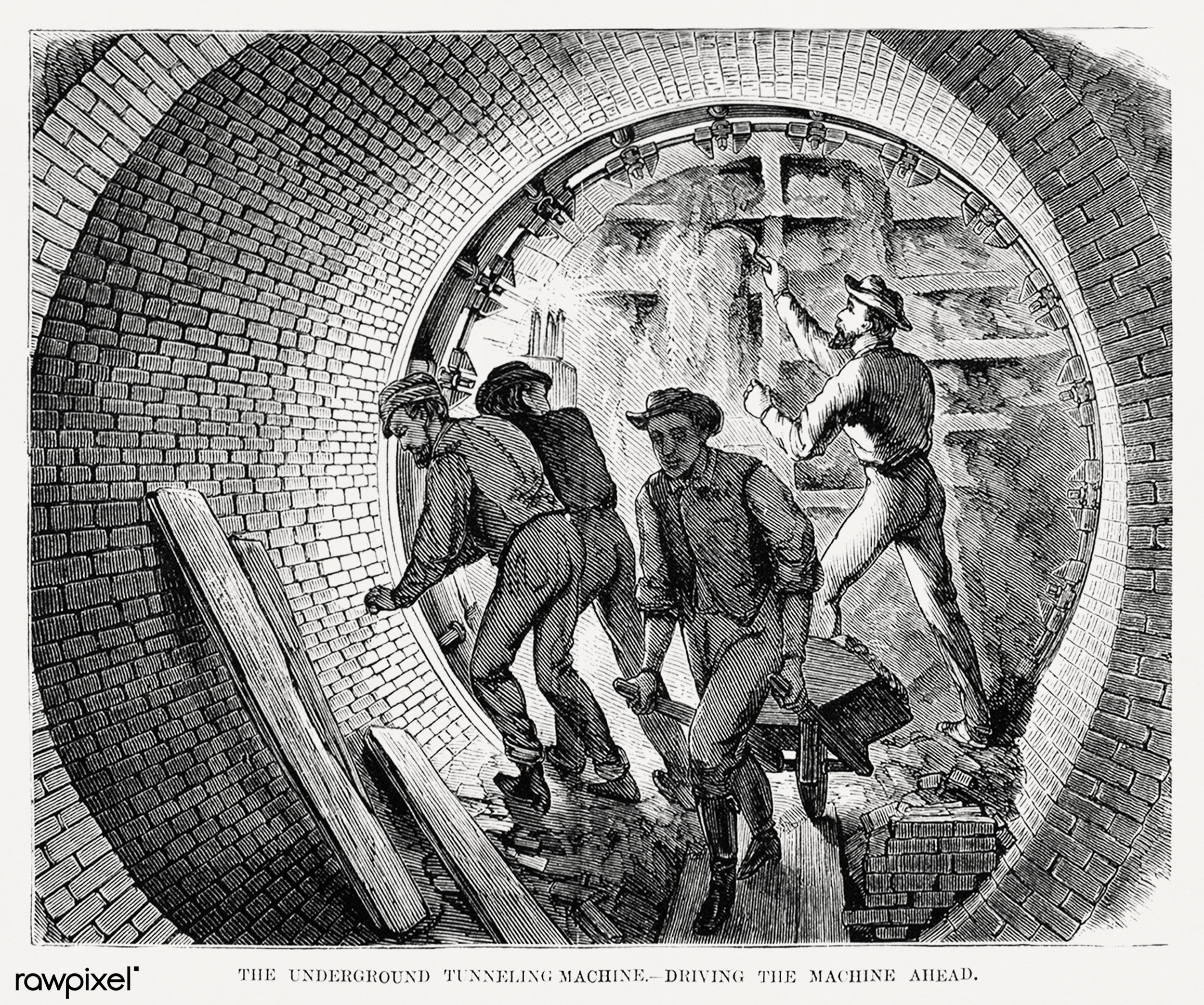

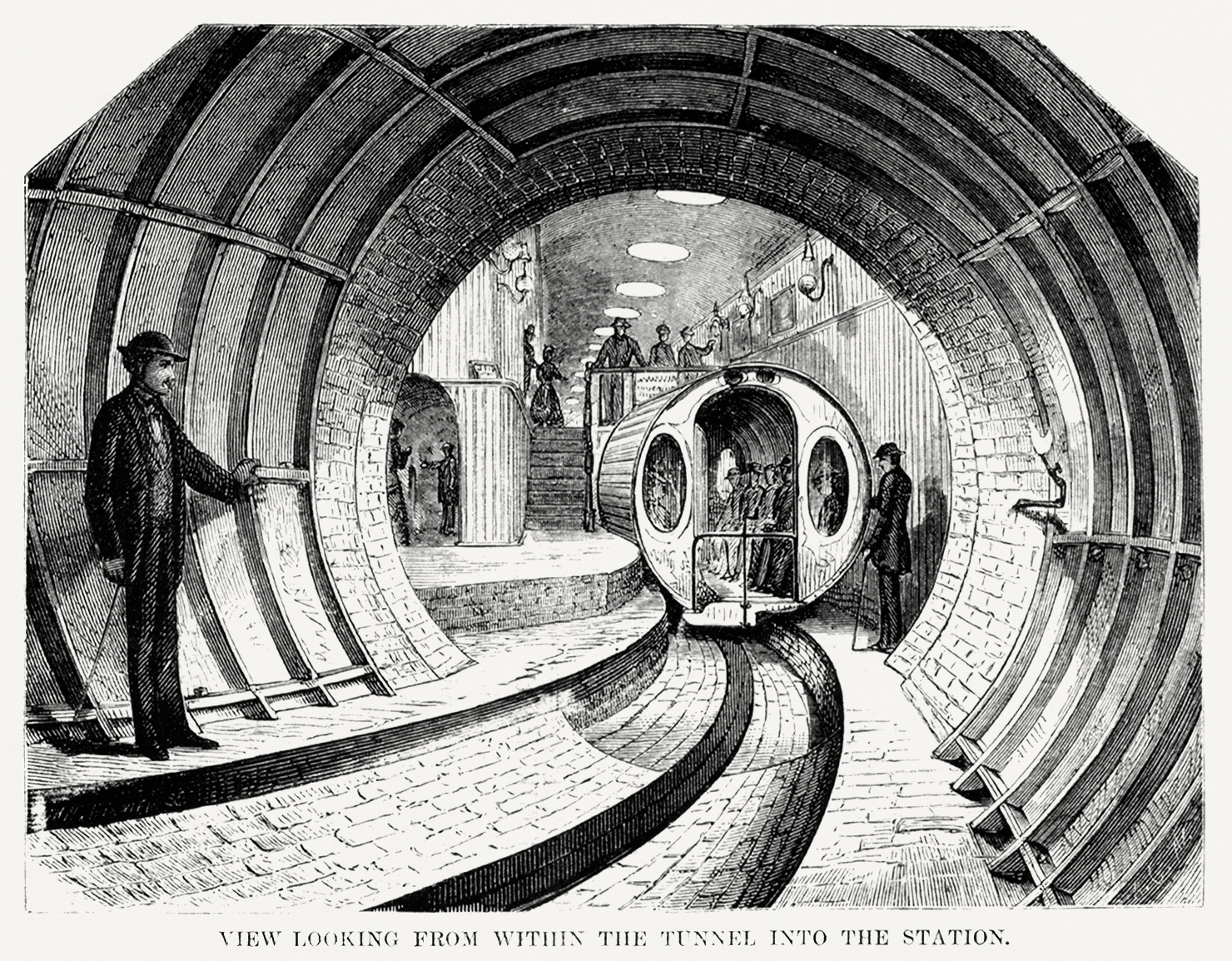

== See also ==
- Atmospheric railway
- Cobble Hill Tunnel, a similar abandoned tunnel in New York City
- Gravity-vacuum transit
- Track 61 (New York City), another private railroad tunnel in New York City
