= Brooklyn Historic Railway Association =

American nonprofit organization

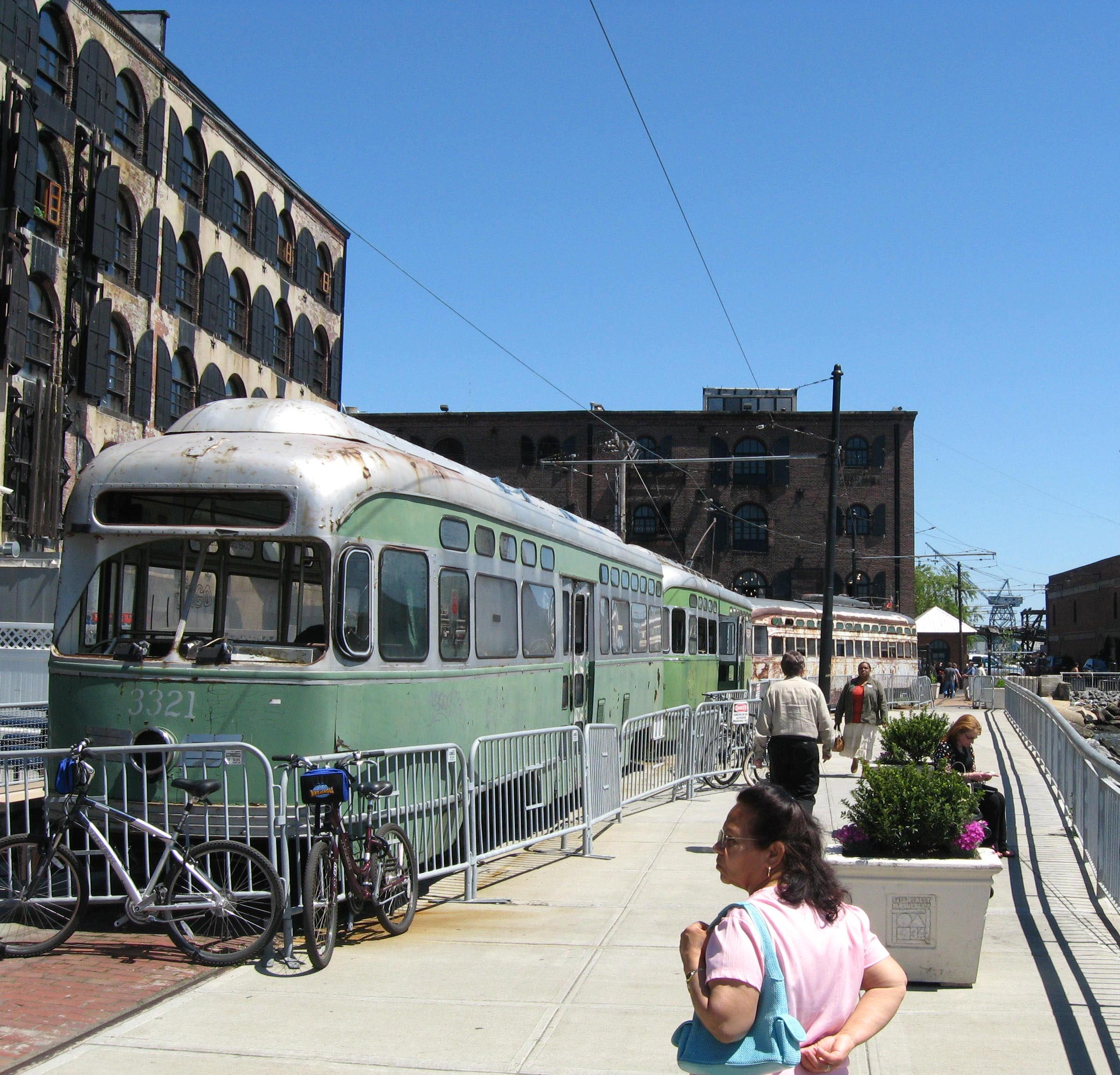
- Cars under wire on Red Hook
- Abbreviation: BHRA
- Founded: 1982; 44 years ago
- Type: 501(c)(3)
- Tax ID no.: 11-2611688
- Legal status: Nonprofit organization
- Headquarters: Red Hook, Brooklyn, New York, U.S.
- President, Chairman: Bob Diamond
- Website: www.brooklynrail.net

The Brooklyn Historic Railway Association (BHRA) is a 501(c)(3) nonprofit organization with a shop, trolley barn and offices located in Red Hook, Brooklyn, New York, on the historic Beard Street Piers (c. 1870). BHRA had a fleet of 16 trolleys (15 PCC trolleys and a leased 1897 trolley car from the Oslo Trams, in Oslo, Norway).

== History of project ==
The BHRA's origin began with the rediscovery of the Cobble Hill Tunnel by the late Bob Diamond in 1980. BHRA was formed in 1982 to restore the historic tunnel. The Atlantic Avenue Tunnel (constructed in 1844) is the world's oldest subway tunnel. BHRA successfully filed and received designation for the tunnel on the National Register of Historic Places.

The BHRA received funding and permission from the city to construct a light rail route in Red Hook. However, the project was hampered due to the New York City Department of Transportation (DOT) withdrawing its support from the project. The DOT identified several potential improvements which did not include a streetcar, however, that would improve access and mobility for neighborhood residents. Construction was stopped on a 7-block extension to the line due to the removal and scrapping of rails, ties, and other items of railroad equipment by the DOT, which were stored on land that was slated for the Fairway supermarket project.

On June 30, 2003, BHRA was ordered to remove and fill in all trolley tracks on public streets by the DOT. The DOT revoked consent for the project to proceed or exist on city streets. Shortly thereafter, BHRA completely ceased operation. All the PCC trolleys except for No. 3303 were removed from Brooklyn.

The BHRA ran organized tours of the Cobble Hill Tunnel from time to time, but all tours are currently suspended.

Bob Diamond died on August 21, 2021.

== See also ==
- Cobble Hill Tunnel
- Brooklyn–Queens Connector
