= Interborough Express =

Proposed light rail line in New York City

Overview
- Status: Planning
- Owner: Metropolitan Transportation Authority
- Locale: Brooklyn, Queens
- Termini: Roosevelt Avenue; Brooklyn Army Terminal
- Stations: 18

Service
- Type: Grade-separated light rail
- System: MTA New York City Transit
- Services: 1

History
- Planned opening: Early 2030s

Technical
- Track length: 14 mi (23 km)
- Track gauge: 4 ft 8 1/2 in (1,435 mm) standard gauge

The Interborough Express (IBX) is a proposed 14-mile (23 km) 24/7 light rail transit line in New York City. As proposed, the line would operate on dedicated, grade-separated tracks within the existing right-of-way from the Bay Ridge Branch and Fremont Secondary to connect the Brooklyn Army Terminal in Bay Ridge, Brooklyn, with the neighborhood of Jackson Heights, Queens. As of 2025, the Metropolitan Transportation Authority (MTA) estimated that the project would be operational in the early 2030s.

== History ==
=== Proposal ===
The Regional Plan Association (RPA) originally proposed the Triboro RX, a rapid transit line traveling between Brooklyn, Queens, and the Bronx, along this route in 1996. The RPA proposed the line again in 2012 and continued advocating for it. In mid-October 2019, the MTA announced that it would study the feasibility of restoring passenger service on the Bay Ridge Branch portion of the route. The section to the Bronx was eliminated from the plans because of insufficient space along Amtrak's Hell Gate Line, which was set to be expanded to accommodate Penn Station Access commuter-rail services. On January 23, 2020, the MTA Board awarded a $1.3 million contract to study the feasibility of restoring passenger service to this section to AECOM. In November 2021, Acting MTA Chairman and CEO Janno Lieber said that money from the 2021 Infrastructure Investment and Jobs Act could be used to fund the completion of the Bay Ridge Branch project.

In early January 2022, as part of her State of the State address, New York governor Kathy Hochul announced that the state would move forward with the Bay Ridge Branch Line by conducting an environmental study on the IBX. The study would consider whether the line should be heavy rail (rapid transit or regional rail), light rail, or bus rapid transit. A feasibility study was also completed on January 20, 2022. Governor Hochul also announced that she had directed the Port Authority of New York and New Jersey to complete an environmental review for the Cross-Harbor Rail Tunnel for freight. Hochul announced in her January 2023 address that the project would proceed as a light-rail corridor. According to the Metropolitan Transportation Authority (MTA), the route had to run along Metropolitan Avenue and 69th Street in Middle Village, Queens, to avoid a narrow tunnel under All Faiths Cemetery; the cemetery's superintendent said in early 2024 that the MTA had never contacted the cemetery. Opponents of the street-running segment said it would have made IBX vehicles vulnerable to delays, since trains would be restricted to 25 miles per hour (40 km/h) and run in mixed traffic. In response, in October 2024, MTA construction chief Jamie Torres-Springer stated the agency would consider widening or replacing the existing tunnel. In August 2025, the MTA and Governor Hochul announced a design change which would allow construction of a tunnel under the cemetery, eliminating the need for street operation.

=== Pre-construction ===
Virtual town hall meetings for the IBX began in August 2023, followed by in-person town halls that November. At the time, the MTA expected that the project would be finished in 2027 at a cost of $5.5 billion. Part of the IBX's construction would be funded by revenue from congestion pricing in New York City. In her 2024 State of the State address, Kathy Hochul announced that formal design and engineering work would begin later in the year. The MTA allocated $2.75 billion in funding for the project in its 2025–2029 Capital Plan, accounting for half the estimated cost; pre-construction work was still underway in late 2024. That October, the MTA announced that it planned to dig a tunnel underneath All Faiths Cemetery to avoid street running. The MTA simultaneously announced that it would begin the planning process for the Interborough Express after it received $67 million from the federal and state governments, and in October 2024, it opened a request for proposal for the IBX's design and environmental review. At the time, the preliminary design process was expected to take two years, and daily ridership projections had been increased from 110,000 to 160,000.

The light metro line is to be built in two stages, the first of which would entail clearing the site, constructing tunnels and bridges, and relocating freight tracks. The installation of tracks, the purchase of rolling stock, and the construction of stations would be part of the second stage. The MTA was conducting environmental reviews of the project by January 2025, and the MTA began hosting open houses on the project that March. In July 2025, a joint venture between Jacobs and HDR was hired to design the IBX line for $165.98 million. Additionally, the Regional Plan Association (RPA) received a $150,000 grant from the New York Community Trust for community engagement regarding the IBX project. That October, the MTA announced that it would conduct an environmental impact statement for the project, the final item needed before construction could proceed. The plans faced opposition from residents of Maspeth and Middle Village, Queens, residential neighborhoods with substantially lower population densities than the rest of the route. An advocacy report from the RPA, published in November 2026, found that wider sidewalks and bus lanes would need to be added near stations to increase ridership on the IBX.

== Description ==
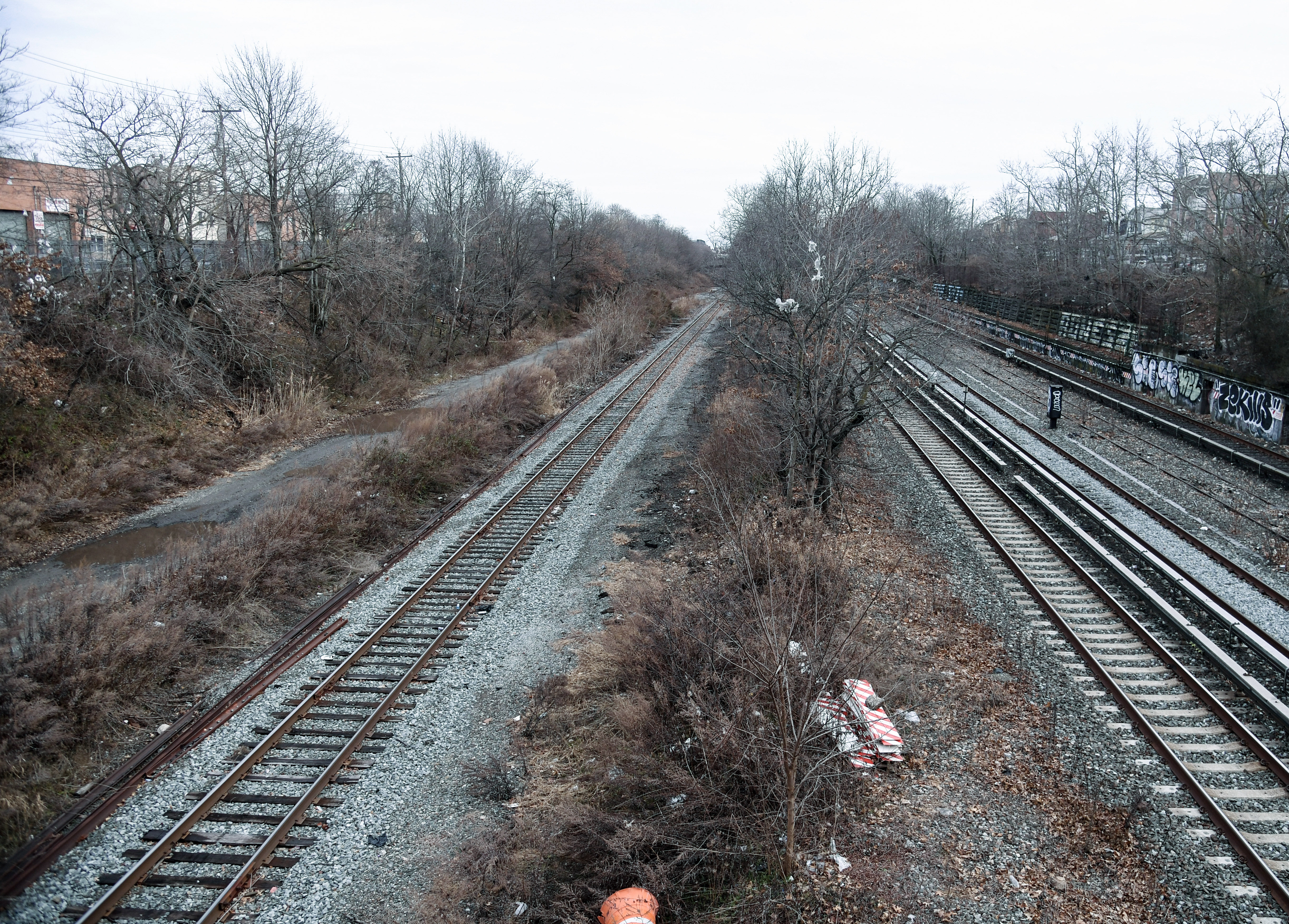
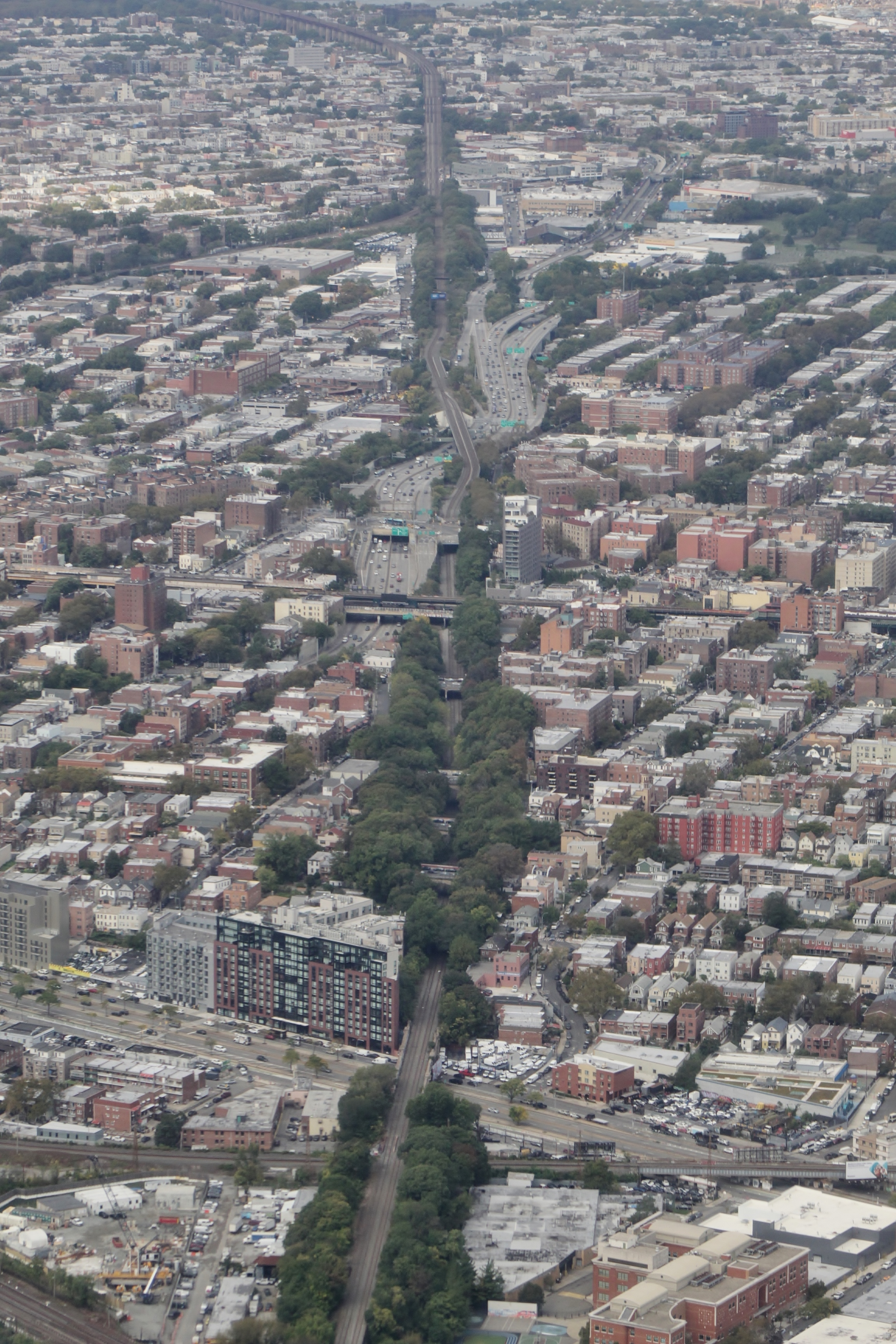
The Interborough Express is planned to use the Bay Ridge Branch (left) and Fremont Secondary (right).

The IBX is planned to be built as a light rail line. Reasons for the light rail choice include faster service, easier construction due to existing right of way, availability of off-the-shelf rolling stock, and a lower overall cost that is estimated at $5.5 billion, or about $48,000 per expected daily rider. Proposed headways are 5 minutes during peak hours and 10 minutes at other times. Freight use would continue, requiring separated tracks. End-to-end travel times are expected to be 32 minutes, and the route would connect up to 17 subway lines and the Long Island Rail Road.

Weekday ridership is initially projected to be 115,000. The project is also expected to significantly increase new residential development along its route. In June 2025, the New York Building Congress published a report indicating that 70,000–100,000 housing units could be built around the Interborough Express's route within a decade, depending on the extent to which the areas around the line are rezoned. Real-estate executives said the IBX would help revitalize neighborhoods on the route, though some residents along the route expressed concerns about crowding and noise.

During an open house in May 2025, MTA officials, including IBX Project Executive Charles Gans, described the line as a "high capacity light metro", with a revised estimate of 160,000 weekday riders. As of May 2026, the MTA project page refers to the IBX as a "light rail transit project".

=== Preliminary stations ===
As of 2024, the preliminary stations are: Roosevelt Avenue, Grand Avenue, Eliot Avenue, Metropolitan Avenue, Myrtle Avenue, Wilson Avenue, Atlantic Avenue, Livonia Avenue, Linden Boulevard, Remsen Avenue, Utica Avenue, Flatbush Avenue–Nostrand Avenue, East 16th Street, McDonald Avenue, New Utrecht Avenue, Eighth Avenue, Fourth Avenue, and Brooklyn Army Terminal.

== See also ==
- Brooklyn–Queens Connector, a proposed streetcar line connecting Brooklyn and Queens on a different route
