= Peets =

Peets is a surname. Notable people with the surname include:

- Brian Peets (born 1956), American football player
- Elbert Peets (1886–1968), American architect, city planner, and author
- Ülo Peets (born 1944), Estonian politician
- William Peets (born 1952), U.S. Virgin Islands boxer

== See also ==
- Peet (disambiguation)
