= John Peet =

John Peet may refer to:

- John Peet (surgeon) (1818–1874), British surgeon
- John Peet (1915–1988), British journalist
- John Peet (born 1954), British journalist
- J. H. John Peet, travelling secretary of the Biblical Creation Society
