= Pete (surname) =

Pete is a surname of Dutch & Hungarian origins. Notable people with the name include:

- Eric Pete, American author
- Hazel Pete (1914–2003), Native American basket weaver
- Lawrence Pete (born 1966), American football player
- Lee Pete (1924–2010), American sports-talk radio broadcaster and college athlete
- Mary Pete (1957–2018), American anthropologist and educator
- Megan Pete or Megan Thee Stallion (born 1995), American rapper
- Rémi Pété (born 1987), French male canoeist
- Shiyazh Pete (born 2003), American football player

== See also ==
- Peet § Surname
- Peete, surname
