= Bob Diamond (engineer) =

American engineer

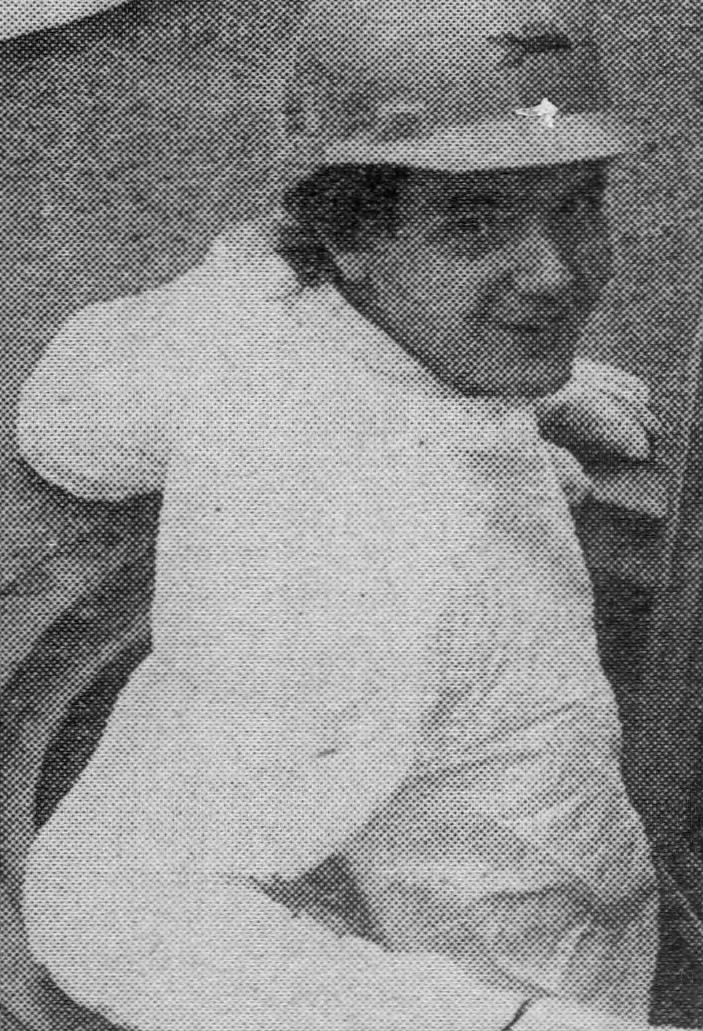
- Diamond in 1982
- Born: Robert Stephen Turin; October 6, 1959; Brooklyn, New York, U.S.
- Died: August 21, 2021 (aged 61)
- Occupation: Engineer

Robert Stephen Turin (October 6, 1959 – August 21, 2021), also known as The Trolley Man, was an American engineer.

== Life and career ==
Diamond was born in Brooklyn. He was an engineer.

In 1980, Diamond gained national attention after rediscovering an abandoned 19th-century Atlantic Avenue train tunnel in Brooklyn, New York.

In 1982, Diamond founded the Brooklyn Historic Railway Association, a nonprofit organization.

Diamond died on August 21, 2021, at the age of 61.
