= Peet =

Peet or PEET may refer to:

== Surname ==
- Alfred Peet (1920–2007), Dutch-American entrepreneur and the founder of Peet's Coffee & Tea
  - Peet's Coffee & Tea, specialty coffee roaster and retailer founded in 1966
- Amanda Peet (born 1972), American actress
- Azalia Emma Peet (1887–1973), American missionary teacher in Japan
- A. W. Peet (born 1968), New Zealand physicist
- Bill Peet (1915–2002), American children's book illustrator and a story writer for Disney Studios
- John Peet (disambiguation), various individuals
- Lee Pete (1924–2010), American sports-talk radio broadcaster and college athlete
- Mal Peet (1947–2015), English author of novels mainly for young adults
- Margot Peet (1903–1995), American painter
- Stephen Peet (1920–2005), British filmmaker
- Thomas Eric Peet (1882–1934), English Egyptologist
- Wayne Peet (born 1954), American jazz pianist and organist
- Beaumelle Sturtevant-Peet (1840–1921), American temperance activist and suffragist

== Given name ==
- Peet Aren (1889–1970), Estonian artist
- Peet Coombes (1952–1997), English musician
- Peet Johanson (1881–1939), Estonian politician
- Peet Kask (born 1948), Estonian politician
- Peet Petersen (1941–1980), Dutch soccer player
- Peet Pienaar (born 1971), South African performance artist
- Peet Stol (1880–1956), Dutch footballer

== Others ==
- Rogers Peet, a men's clothing company founded in 1874
  - Rogers Peet Building, a five-story structure built in Manhattan in 1863
- Peet Brothers, a Kansas-based soap manufacturer that merged with Palmolive to become Palmolive-Peet, and later Colgate-Palmolive
- Peet Limited, Australian real estate company

== See also ==
- Peets, surname
- Peat, an accumulation of partially decayed vegetation matter
- Peat (disambiguation)
- Pete (disambiguation)
