= Rogers Peet Building =

Building in Manhattan, New York

Coordinates: 40°42′47″N 74°00′22″W

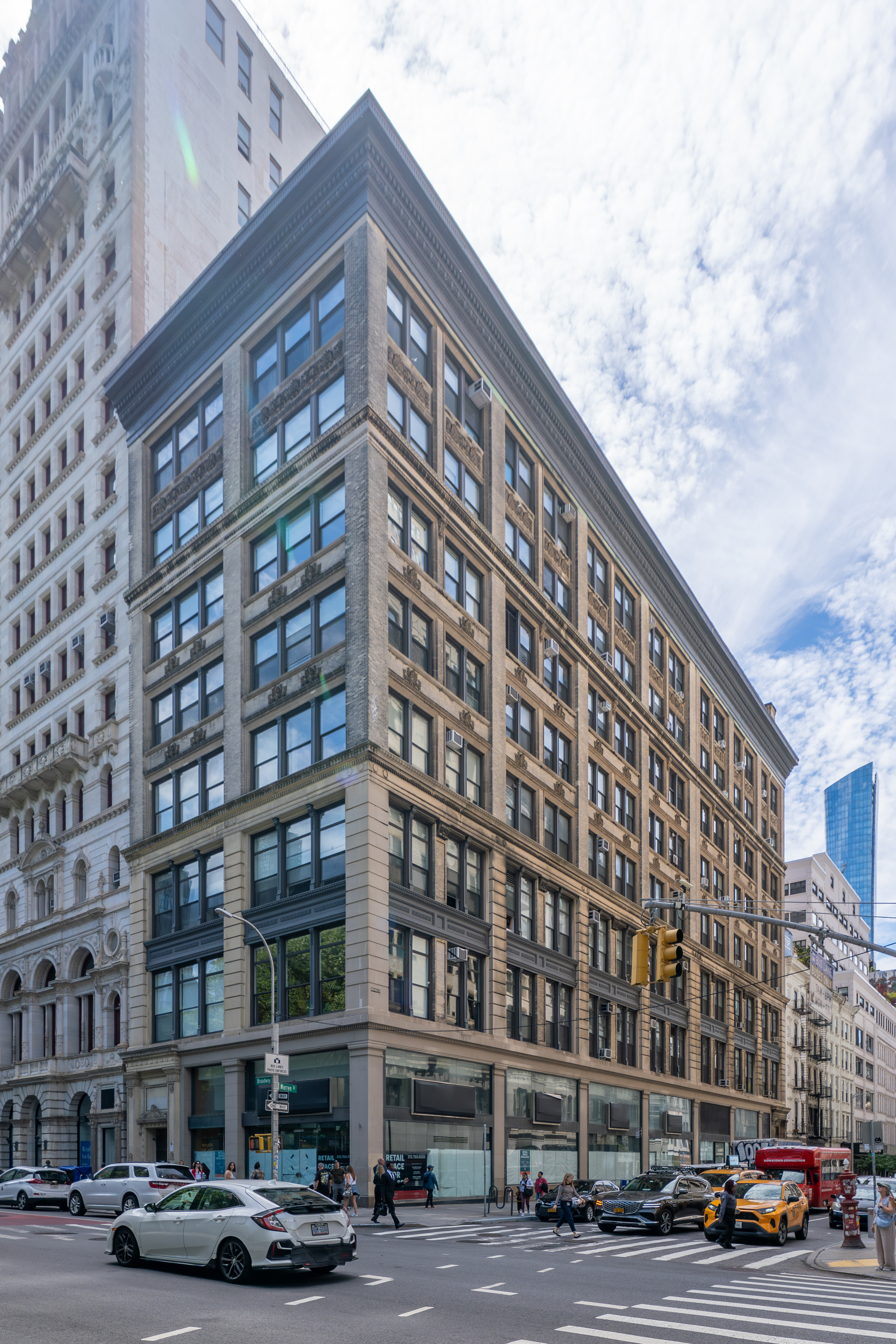
Rogers Peet Building (2026)

The Rogers Peet Building is an eight-story building in the Civic Center and Tribeca neighborhoods of Manhattan in New York City. Built between 1898 and 1899, it replaced a five-story structure that was home to the Rogers Peet clothing store between 1863 and 1898, when the original structure burned down.

== Original building ==
The original building, located at Broadway and Warren Street, belonged to the Emanuel Hoffman estate. For 25 years the ground floor of the Rogers Peet Building was occupied by tailors Devlin & Company, who paid an annual rental of $45,000. The Rogers Peet Building had a double basement. The lower cellar housed the Beach Pneumatic Transit railroad, a pneumatic tube that ran across Broadway to Mall Street between 1870 and 1873. The tunnel was used as a shooting gallery after the abandonment of the railroad.

=== Fire ===
At the center of the business section of late 19th century New York City, the conflagration spread to the sixteen-story Home Life Building. At 2 a.m. on December 4, 1898, bystanders on Broadway watched as another floor of the burnt out Rogers Peet Building collapsed and fell. The outer edge of the structure, which fronted on Warren Street, bulged a foot or a foot and a half outward at its top. Flames first emanated from the basement of the Rogers Peet Building, yet it was uncertain how the fire began. A single pane from the top floor of the edifice fell onto a statue of patriot spy Nathan Hale, and broke into a thousand fragments. At the time of its destruction the Rogers Peet Building was occupied by Rogers, Peet & Company, clothiers; Brown & Sheehan, lawyers; John Brien, contractor; L.T. Smith, architect; and the Massachusetts Mutual Life Insurance Company. Today, the site is occupied by part of the Home Life Insurance Company Building.

== Current building ==
The current eight-story building at 258 Broadway was designed by John B. Snook & Sons and completed in 1899. It is a New York City designated landmark.
