= Track 61 (New York City) =

Storage track of Grand Central Terminal

Coordinates: 40°45′23″N 73°58′27″W

Track 61 is a storage track abutting a private railroad platform on the Metro-North Railroad in Manhattan, New York City. It is located beneath the Waldorf Astoria New York hotel, within an underground storage yard northeast of Grand Central Terminal. The platform is part of the Grand Central Terminal complex.

== History ==
Track 61 is part of the "Lex Yard", a twelve-track storage yard under the Waldorf Astoria Hotel. It shares a platform with track 63, to its west. A similar platform exists between tracks 53 and 54, to the east. The yard was built during the construction of Grand Central Terminal in the 1910s, and served the terminal's power station and heating plant. The platforms at tracks 61/63 and 53/54 were originally used to carry ashes away. The power plant was demolished in 1930 to make way for the hotel.

The platform was not originally intended to be used as a station, but its location made it ideal for unobtrusive access to the Waldorf Astoria when the hotel was built. A key feature of the siding was a large freight elevator specifically designed to accommodate an automobile, allowing VIPs to access the hotel directly from their rail cars.

Track 61 was famously used by General John J. Pershing in 1938; by Franklin Delano Roosevelt during World War II in 1944; and by General Douglas MacArthur in 1951. Roosevelt utilized the siding to hide his paralysis from the public; his armored limousine would drive directly off the train, onto the platform, and into the elevator, which would deposit him into the hotel's garage.

The track was also used for the exhibition of the American Locomotive Company's new diesel locomotive in 1946; a fashion show by Filene's and the New Haven Railroad in 1948; a charity-benefit dinner in 1955; and an event featuring Andy Warhol in 1965. The 1946 event was the only event in which Track 61 was open to the public.

In 1978, there were plans to convert Track 61 into a platform for Amtrak trains, though this never happened. The track was also reportedly set as an escape option for President George W. Bush, Colin Powell, and Condoleezza Rice in 2003, while in U.N. General Assembly meetings. As of May 1, 2014, it has been reported to still be in occasional use. However, during the comprehensive renovation of the Waldorf Astoria from 2017 to 2025, access to the platform from the hotel was restricted for construction security, though the tracks remained part of the active Metro-North infrastructure.

== Roosevelt traincar ==
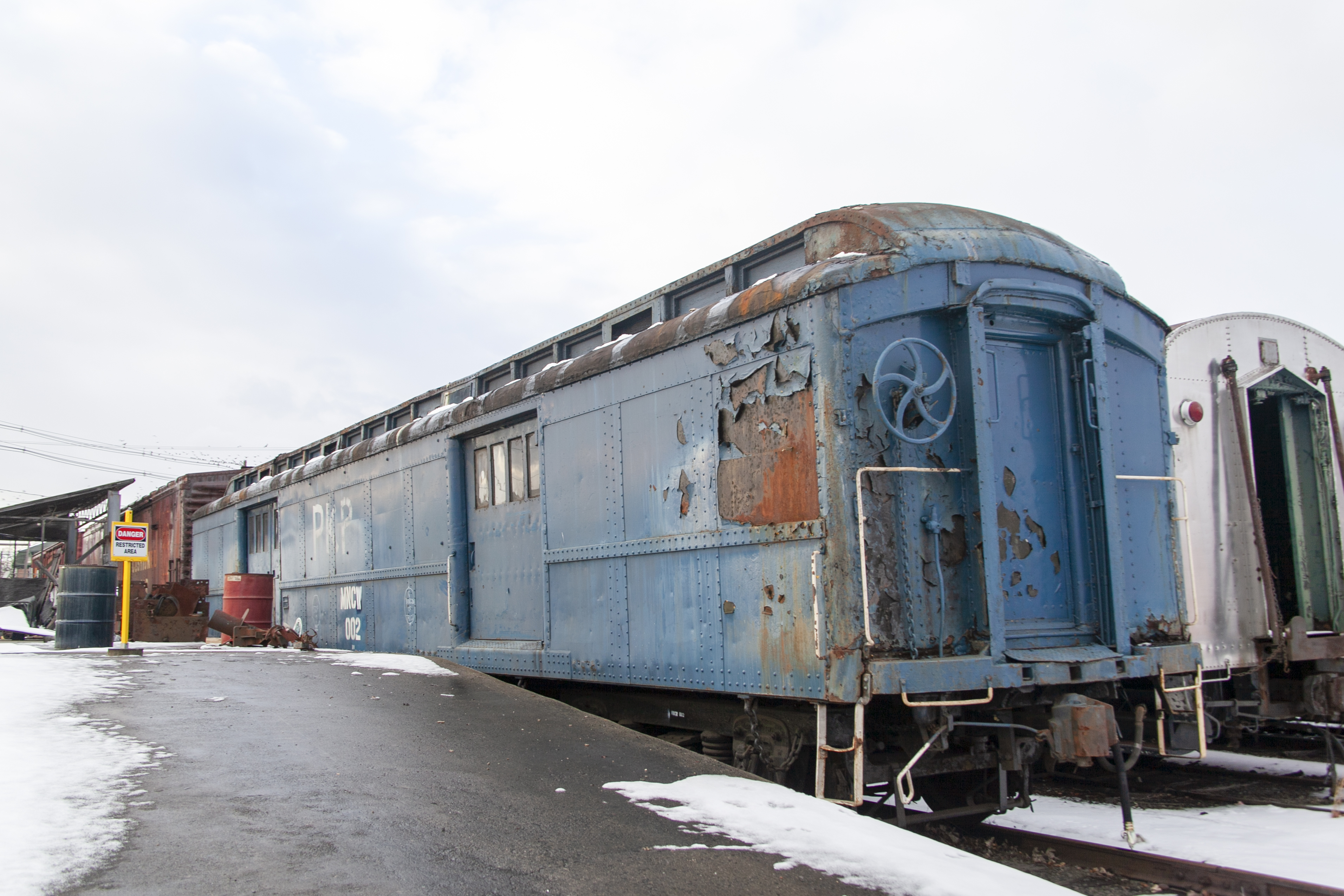
The baggage car mistakenly identified as Franklin D. Roosevelt's personal car was stored near Track 61 before being moved to the Danbury Railway Museum

Track 63 held MNCW #002, a baggage car, for about 20 to 30 years. The railcar's location near Roosevelt's Track 61 made the former tour guide Dan Brucker and others incorrectly claim that it was the president's personal train car that transported his limousine. The baggage car was moved to the Danbury Railway Museum in 2019.

== See also ==
- Beach Pneumatic Transit
- Cobble Hill Tunnel
- Transportation in New York City
- Transportation in New York State
