= Cobble Hill Tunnel =

Disused tunnel in Brooklyn, New York

- Atlantic Avenue Tunnel
- U.S. National Register of Historic Places
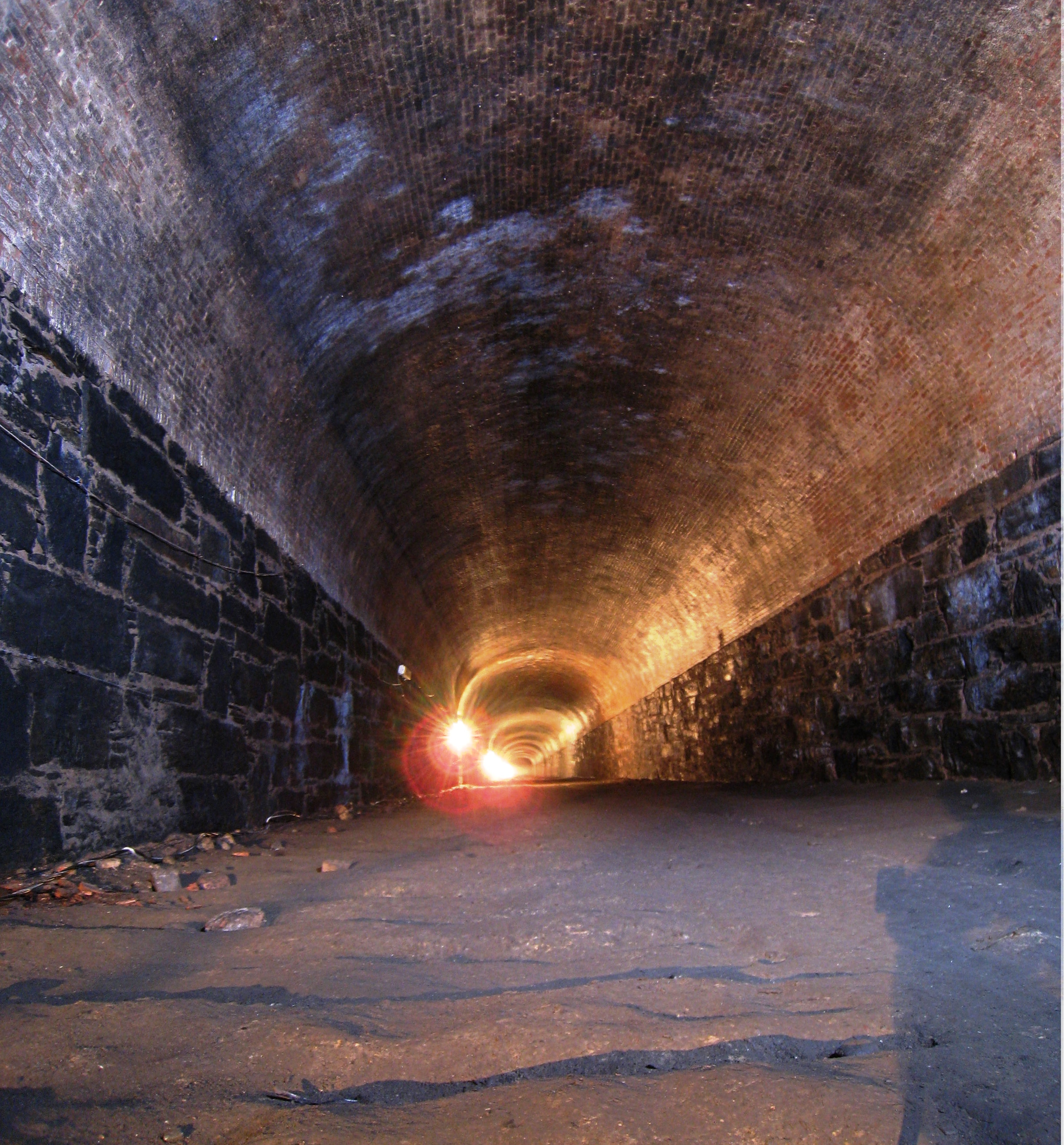
- The tunnel in 2009

- Location within New York City Location within New York Location within the United States
- Location: Brooklyn, New York City
- Coordinates: 40°41′25.6″N 73°59′42.5″W
- Built: 1844
- Architect: Asa Stebbins
- Architectural style: Roman, Italianate, Queen Anne
- NRHP reference No.: 89001388
- Added to NRHP: September 7, 1989

The Cobble Hill Tunnel (also known as the Atlantic Avenue Tunnel) is an abandoned Long Island Rail Road (LIRR) tunnel beneath Atlantic Avenue in Brooklyn, New York City, running through the neighborhoods of Downtown Brooklyn and Cobble Hill. When open, it ran for about 2,517 feet (767 m) between Columbia Street and Boerum Place. It is the oldest railway tunnel beneath a city street in North America that was fully devoted to rail. (Note: There are two tunnels on the Park Avenue main line in Manhattan that are older, but were used by horse-drawn carriages rather than true railways. A tunnel stretching 596 feet (182 m) was completed through Prospect Hill, one of the highest points on the East Side of Manhattan, between 92nd and 95th Streets, in 1837. In addition, the Park Avenue Tunnel between 33rd and 40th Streets in Manhattan, was opened in 1834.) It is also deemed the oldest subway tunnel in the world by the Guinness Book of World Records.

== Construction and operation ==
Originally built as an open cut, construction began in May 1844, and opened for use on December 3, 1844, but was not completely finished until mid-1845. It was built mainly to satisfy public demand for creation of a grade-separated right of way for the Brooklyn and Jamaica Railroad (later Long Island Rail Road) on its way to the South Ferry at the foot of Atlantic Street (later Atlantic Avenue), where passengers could catch ferries to Manhattan. The construction of the cut also lowered the LIRR's grade through Cobble Hill. Around five years after opening the cut was roofed over, converting it into a tunnel. As originally built, the cut was 21 feet (6.4 m) wide and 2,517 feet (767 m) long. Once roofed over, the interior height of the newly created tunnel was 17 feet (5.2 m).

In exchange for building the cut, the City of Brooklyn granted the B&J permission to operate its steam locomotives on Atlantic Street west of Fifth Avenue (then Parmentier's Garden/Gowanus Lane), all the way to Brooklyn's South Ferry (the present location of Brooklyn's Pier 7). Prior to the cut being built, the LIRR's western terminus was Atlantic Street at Clinton Street. Train cars were hauled by teams of horses along Atlantic Street from Clinton Street to Parmentier's Garden, where steam locomotives were attached. While the cut was being built, the railroad operated to a temporary terminal at Pacific Street and Henry Street.

The Cobble Hill Tunnel was part of the first rail link between New York City and Boston, Massachusetts. The railroad connected Lower Manhattan via the South Ferry to Greenport on the North Fork of Long Island; a ferry connected Greenport to Stonington, Connecticut, where a rail link continued to Boston. This avoided some difficult construction of bridges over the rivers of southern Connecticut. In 1848, the New York and New Haven Railroad Line was completed through Connecticut, providing a direct, faster rail connection from New York City to Boston. The Cobble Hill Tunnel and the Long Island Railroad remained the primary means of access to most of central Long Island from Manhattan and New York City.

The ends of the tunnel were sealed in the fall of 1861. The similar Murray Hill Tunnel on the New York and Harlem Railroad was built as an open cut around 1836, roofed over around the 1850s, and is now in use for automobile traffic.

== Closure controversy ==
In 1861, the New York State Legislature voted to ban railroad locomotives from within the limits of the City of Brooklyn. A tax assessment was ordered on all property owners along Atlantic Street (today Atlantic Avenue), to defray the costs of the closure.

== Dormancy ==
Walt Whitman wrote of the tunnel:

The old tunnel, that used to lie there under ground, a passage of Acheron-like solemnity and darkness, now all closed and filled up, and soon to be utterly forgotten, with all its reminiscences; however, there will, for a few years yet be many dear ones, to not a few Brooklynites, New Yorkers, and promiscuous crowds besides. For it was here you started to go down the island, in summer. For years, it was confidently counted on that this spot, and the railroad of which it was the terminus, were going to prove the permanent seat of business and wealth that belong to such enterprises. But its glory, after enduring in great splendor for a season, has now vanished—at least its Long Island Railroad glory has. The tunnel: dark as the grave, cold, damp, and silent. How beautiful look earth and heaven again, as we emerge from the gloom! It might not be unprofitable, now and then, to send us mortals—the dissatisfied ones, at least, and that's a large proportion—into some tunnel of several days' journey. We'd perhaps grumble less, afterward, at God's handiwork.

In March 1916, the Bureau of Investigation suspected German terrorists were making bombs in the tunnel, and broke through the roof of the tunnel with jackhammers. They found nothing, installed an electric light, and resealed it. In the 1920s, it was rumored to be used for both mushroom growing and bootleg whiskey stills, even though there was no access into the main portion of the tunnel. It became an object of local folklore and legend. In 1936, the New York City Police Department unsuccessfully attempted to enter the tunnel, in order to look for the body of a hoodlum supposedly buried there. In 1941, it was rumored to have been inspected by the federal Works Progress Administration to determine its structural strength, but there is no evidence of this. A few years later, it was once again rumored to have been opened, this time by the FBI, in an unsuccessful search for spies; however, there is no evidence of this. During the late 1950s, it was sought by two rail historians, George Horn and Martin Schachne, but they did not gain access to the tunnel itself.

== Rediscovery ==
The tunnel fell from public notice, but it was rediscovered in 1980 by 20-year-old Bob Diamond, who entered from a manhole that he located at Atlantic Avenue and Court Street. He crawled a distance of 70 feet (21 m) underground through a filled-in section of tunnel that was less than two feet (0.61 m) high and located the bulkhead wall that sealed off the main portion of the tunnel. With the assistance of a Brooklyn Union Gas Company engineering crew, he then broke through the massive concrete bulkhead wall, which is several feet thick. Diamond thereby opened access to the main portion of the tunnel and began to popularize it as an antiquity. He led tours of its interior for his Brooklyn Historic Railway Association from 1982 until December 17, 2010, when the Department of Transportation terminated his contract citing safety concerns.

The History Channel series Cities of the Underworld ran a segment on "New York's Secret Societies" about the tunnel in 2008.

== See also ==
- Beach Pneumatic Transit
- Brooklyn Historic Railway Association
- Park Avenue main line, another railroad line in New York City that may have contained the oldest rail tunnels in the U.S.
- Track 61 (New York City)
- National Register of Historic Places listings in Kings County, New York
