= M60 machine gun =

American military machine gun deployed 1960

Machine Gun, Caliber 7.62 mm, M60
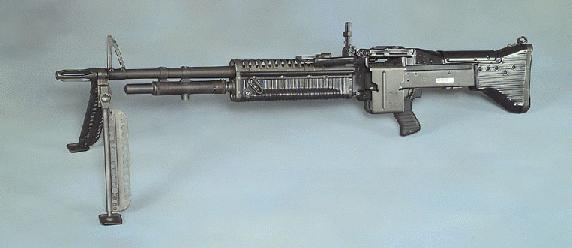
- M60 machine gun with bipod extended
- Type: General-purpose machine gun Medium machine gun
- Place of origin: United States

Service history
- In service: 1960–present
- Used by: See Users
- Wars: Vietnam War; Laotian Civil War; Dominican Civil War; Cambodian Civil War; Moro conflict; The Troubles; Lebanese Civil War; Cambodian–Vietnamese War; Sino-Vietnamese War; Salvadoran Civil War; Operation Urgent Fury; Operation Just Cause; Persian Gulf War; Operation Gothic Serpent; War in Afghanistan; Iraq War; Cambodian–Thai border stand-off; Colombian armed conflict; Insurgency in the Philippines; Bougainville conflict; Myanmar conflict; various others

Production history
- Designed: 1952–1957
- Manufacturer: Saco Defense; U.S. Ordnance
- Unit cost: US$6,000 (M60E3)
- Produced: 1957–present
- Variants: See Variants

Specifications
- Mass: 10.5 kg (23.15 lb)
- Length: 1,105 mm (43.5 in)
- Barrel length: 560 mm (22.0 in)
- Cartridge: 7.62×51mm NATO
- Caliber: 7.62 mm (0.308 in)
- Action: Gas-operated, short-stroke gas piston, opened rotating bolt
- Rate of fire: 550–650 rounds/min
- Muzzle velocity: 2,800 ft/s (853 m/s)
- Effective firing range: 1,200 yd (1,100 m)
- Maximum firing range: 4,073 yd (3,724 m)
- Feed system: Disintegrating belt with M13 Links
- Sights: Iron sights

The M60, officially the Machine Gun, Caliber 7.62 mm, M60, is a family of American general-purpose machine guns firing 7.62×51mm NATO cartridges from a disintegrating belt of M13 links. There are several types of ammunition approved for use in the M60, including ball, tracer, and armor-piercing rounds.

It was adopted in 1960 and issued to units later that year. It has served with every branch of the U.S. military and still serves with the armed forces of other nations. Its manufacture and continued upgrade for military and commercial purchase continues into the 21st century, although it has been replaced or supplemented in most roles by other designs, such as the M240 machine gun in U.S. service.

== Overview ==
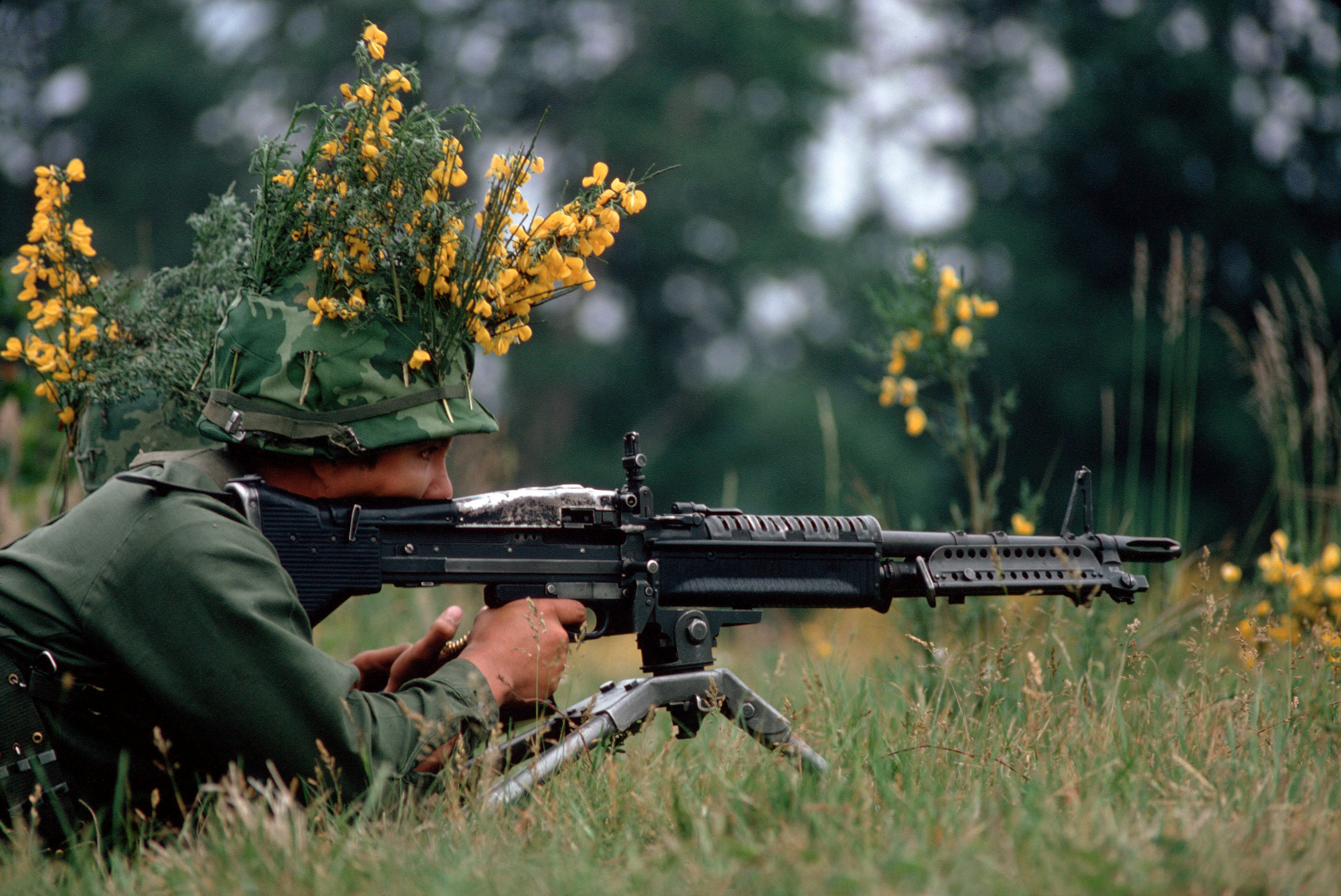
A camouflaged infantryman armed with an M60 machine gun.

The M60 is a belt-fed machine gun that fires the 7.62×51mm NATO cartridge (similar to .308 Winchester), which is commonly used in larger rifles, such as the M14. The gun's weight and the amount of ammunition it can consume when firing make it difficult for a single soldier to carry and operate, so it is generally used as a crew-served weapon, operated by a team of two or three individuals. The team consists of the gunner, the assistant gunner (AG), and the ammunition bearer. The gunner carries the weapon and between 200 and 1,000 rounds of ammunition depending on strength and stamina. The assistant carries a spare barrel and extra ammunition and reloads and spots targets for the gunner. The ammunition bearer carries additional ammunition and the tripod with associated traversing and elevation mechanism (if issued) and fetches more ammunition as needed during firing.

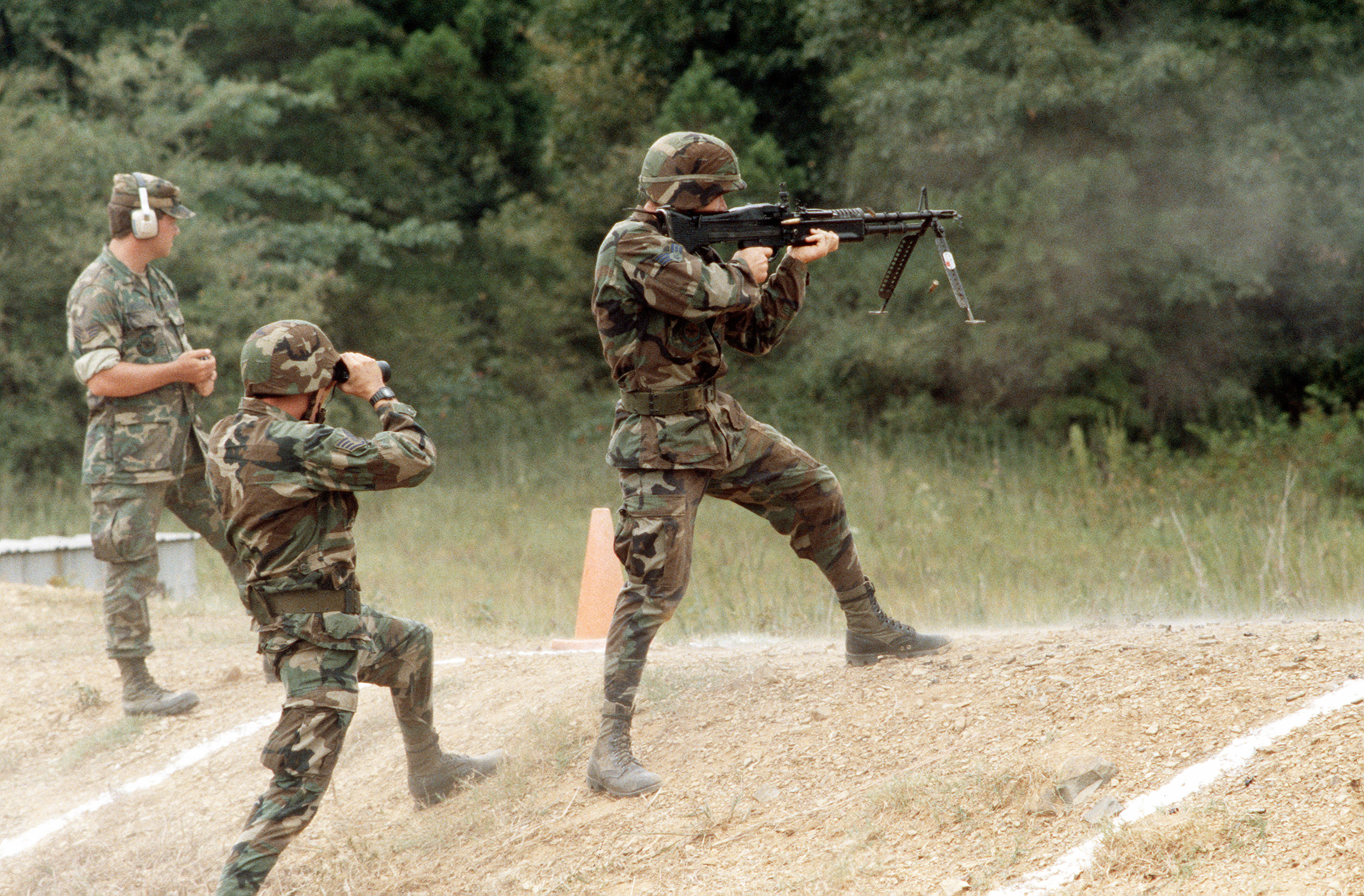
A U.S. airman firing an M60 from the standing position during the Defender Challenge competition in 1988.

The M60 can be accurately fired at short ranges from the shoulder thanks to its design. This was an initial requirement for the design and a hold-over in concept from the M1918 Browning Automatic Rifle. It may also be fired from the integral bipod, M122 tripod, and some other mounts.

M60 ammunition comes in a cloth bandolier containing a cardboard box of 100 pre-linked rounds. The M60 uses the M13 ammunition link, a change from the older M1 link system with which it was not compatible. The cloth bandolier is reinforced to allow it to be hung from the current version of the feed tray. Historically, units in Vietnam used B3A cans from C-rations packs locked into the ammunition box attachment system to roll the ammunition belts over for a straighter and smoother feed to the loading port to enhance reliability of feed. The later models changed the ammunition box attachment point and made this adaptation unnecessary.

The M60 has been adopted by various military agencies around the world. It also has been updated and modernized throughout the years to meet modern military requirements.

== History ==
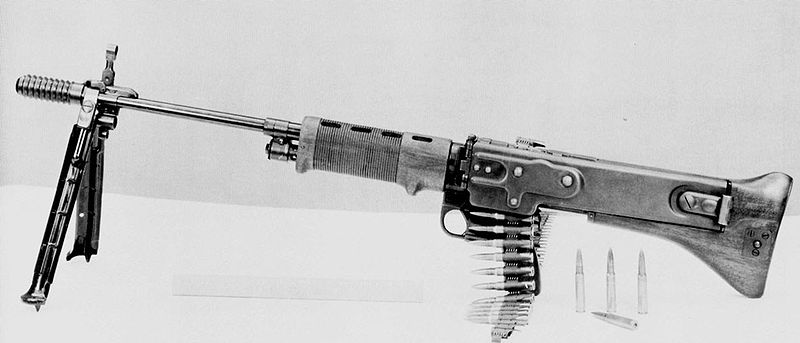
The experimental T-44 machine gun developed from the German FG 42 and MG 42 machine guns.

The M60 machine gun began development after World War II as a program for a new, lighter 7.62 mm machine gun to replace the aging inventory of Browning M1919 machine guns. It was inspired by the German "universal machine gun" concept which attempted to create a single weapon to take over the roles of several different categories of machine gun; the MG 34 and later MG 42 could be carried and used from the shoulder like a typical light machine gun, but could also be used for sustained fire as an emplaced crew-served weapon or mounted on a vehicle.

During World War II, the U.S. Army's interest in the MG 42 led them to construct two test copies of the gun chambered in 30.06 Springfield designated the T24, to evaluate the potential of directly copying the German gun. Trials were undertaken at Aberdeen Proving Ground, where the weapon was rejected after exhibiting serious mechanical faults.

Postwar, the program that would eventually lead to the M60 started with the creation of a proof of concept light machine gun, which was contracted to the Bridge Tool and Die company. A captured German FG 42, which combined the characteristics of a service rifle and light machine gun, was modified to be belt-fed by installing the top cover from an MG 42 onto the left side of the gun and making extensive changes to the receiver to support the function. A single example gun designated the T44 was constructed in 1946. After testing, the Army identified a number of attributes they wanted the new machine gun to have, such as a disintegrating link ammunition belt and a quick-change barrel.

As development continued, a new pattern of gun was built from the ground up, which was designated the T52. This gun retained the more successful elements from the T44, including the MG 42 derived top cover and a similar bolt and carrier. It also incorporated interchangeable barrels, disintegrating link belt, and was now chambered in the new 7.62x51mm cartridge. Compared to the T44, the ammunition feed was moved to the top and the design was strengthened to better support sustained fire. The final evaluation version was designated the T161E3 and intended to replace the M1918 Browning Automatic Rifle and M1919A6 Browning machine gun in the squad automatic weapon and medium machine gun roles. In 1957, it was standardized as the M60 over foreign competitors primarily consisting of the Belgian FN MAG.

=== Vietnam War ===
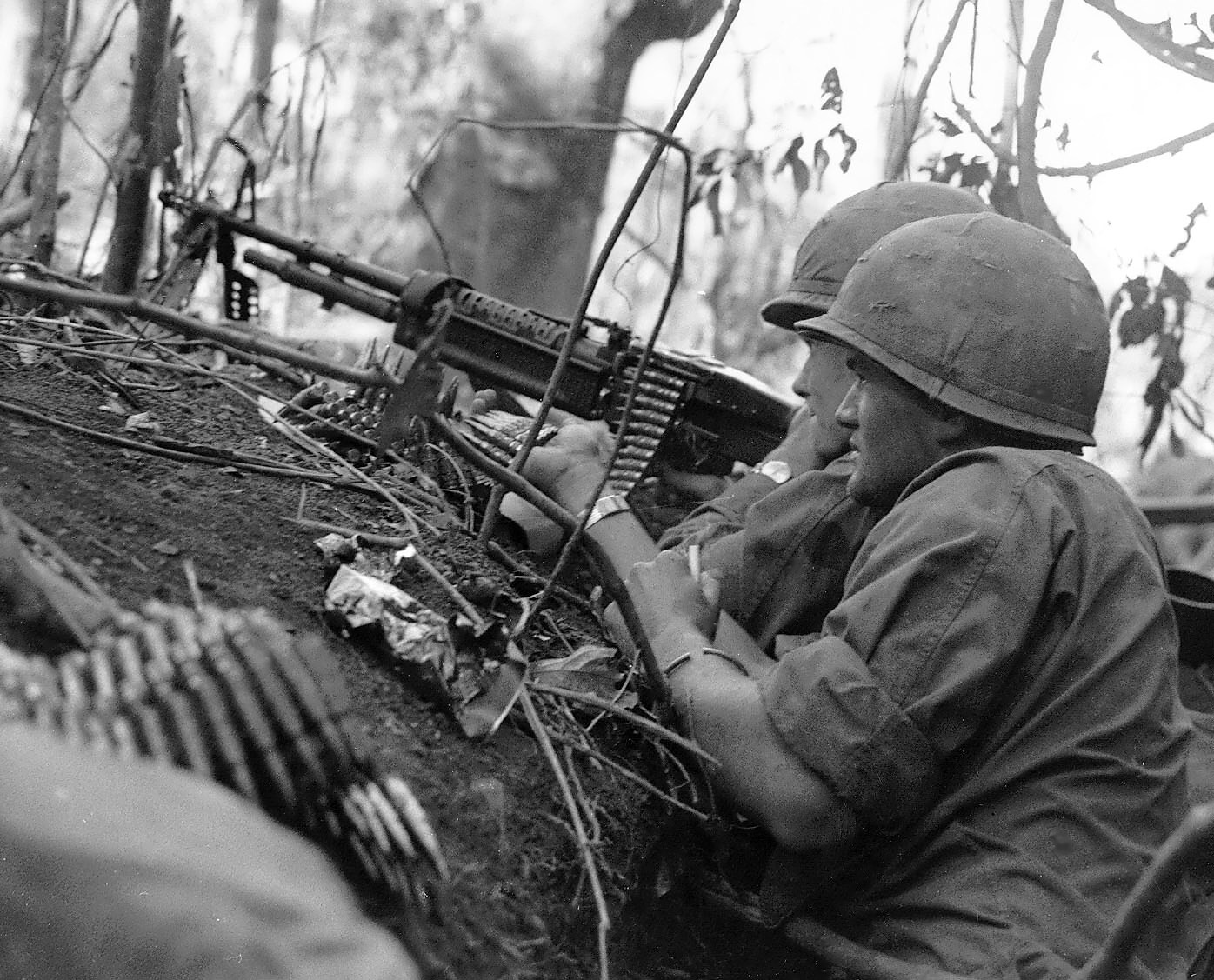
An M60 machine gun being used during the Vietnam War in 1966.

Many U.S. units used the M60 during the Vietnam War as a squad automatic weapon. Every soldier in the rifle squad would carry an additional 200 linked rounds of ammunition for the M60, a spare barrel, or both. The up-gunned M113 armored personnel carrier added two M60 gunners beside the main .50-caliber machine gun while the Patrol Boat, River had one in addition to two .50-cal mounts.

The M60 received the nickname "The Pig" due to its bulky size and appetite for ammunition. Vietnam's tropical climate harshly affected weapons, and the M60 was no exception. Its light weight led to it being easily damaged and critical parts like the bolt and operating rod wore out quickly. Even so, soldiers appreciated the gun's handling, mechanical simplicity, and effective operation from a variety of firing positions. United States Navy SEALs used M60s with shorter barrels and no front sights to reduce weight. Some SEALs had feed chutes from backpacks to have a belt of hundreds of rounds ready to fire without needing to reload.

Many incidents demonstrated the effectiveness of the M60 in combat. In 1966, Medal of Honor recipient Lance Corporal Richard Pittman, a Marine with 1/5 (1st Battalion/5th Marine Regiment), used the M60 to engage superior elements of the 324th North Vietnamese Army (NVA) Division, defeating two enemy machine gun positions and suppressing enemies in his immediate vicinity, then advancing another 50 meters into the face of more attacking NVA.

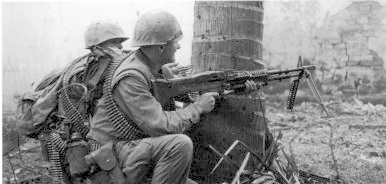
Marine fires his M60 machine gun at an enemy position during the Battle of Huế in Vietnam War.

In the 1980s, the Army partially replaced the M60 by the M249 Squad Automatic Weapon within infantry squads. Their new doctrine reduced the general-purpose machine gun role in favor of portability and a greater volume of fire. However, many disliked the M249, which was less reliable, accurate, and long-ranged, and fired a 5.56 mm round that was lighter than the M60's 7.62 mm round. The M60 was retained in the vehicle-mounted and the general-purpose roles due to its greater power and range.

The U.S. Marine Corps, which became concerned about the M60's reliability, weight, and the high round counts, adopted the M60E3 to replace most original M60s in infantry units. The M60E3 was five pounds lighter than the original M60. It included a forward pistol grip and had the bipod mounted to the receiver rather than the barrel. The weapon still was not durable and its performance was reduced.

In the early 1990s, Saco Defense addressed Navy Special Warfare requirements to develop a retrofit parts package for the machine gun. Called the M60E4, it was more reliable and durable than the M60E3, had a "duckbill" flash suppressor, and a shorter and thicker positive lock gas cylinder extension. The first NAVSPECWAR units received it in late 1994, when it was designated the Mk 43 Mod 0.

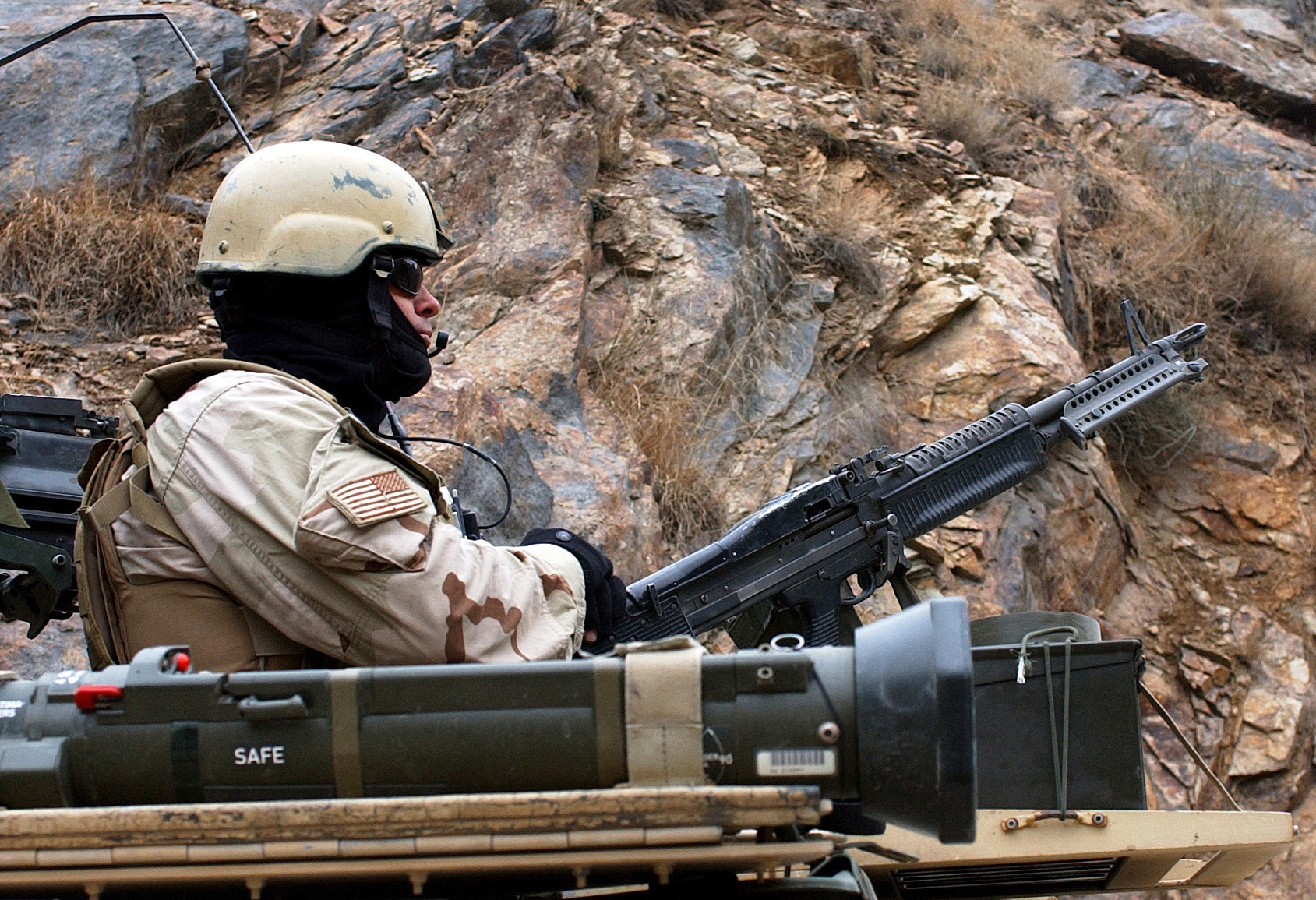
A 19th Special Forces Group soldier mans an M60 machine gun on a Humvee in Afghanistan in March 2004. An AT4 anti-armor recoilless gun can be seen in the foreground.

In January 1994, the U.S. Army began the Medium Machine Gun Upgrade Kit program. The only two competitors were M60 and M240 versions. Saco offered an "enhanced" M60E3 with improved parts, and FN offered the M240 variant of its MAG; both weapons were upgrade kits of weapons already in service. Eighteen guns of each were tested until December 1995. There were two main performance areas: mean rounds between stoppages (MRBS-jams) and mean rounds between failures (MRBF-parts breaking). 50,000 rounds were fired through both guns. The M240 had 2,962 MRBS and 6,442 MRBF, compared to the M60's 846 MRBS and 1,669 MRBF. As a result, the M240 was declared the winner and accepted into infantry service. Although the M60 was lighter, had better balance, was more controllable, and there were many in the inventory, it did not work reliably enough. Starting with Ranger battalions, the U.S. Army began adopting and modifying M240 variants to replace their remaining M60s in the early 1990s.

The M60, though largely phased out, continued to be used in the 21st century by U.S. Navy SEALs. It was the main 7.62 mm machine gun used by some U.S. special operations forces to the late 1990s. As of 2005 it was used by the U.S. Coast Guard, U.S. Navy, and some reserve units.

In 2015, the Danish Army adopted an M60E6 variant from U.S. Ordnance to replace their aging MG 3s in infantry roles.

== Design ==
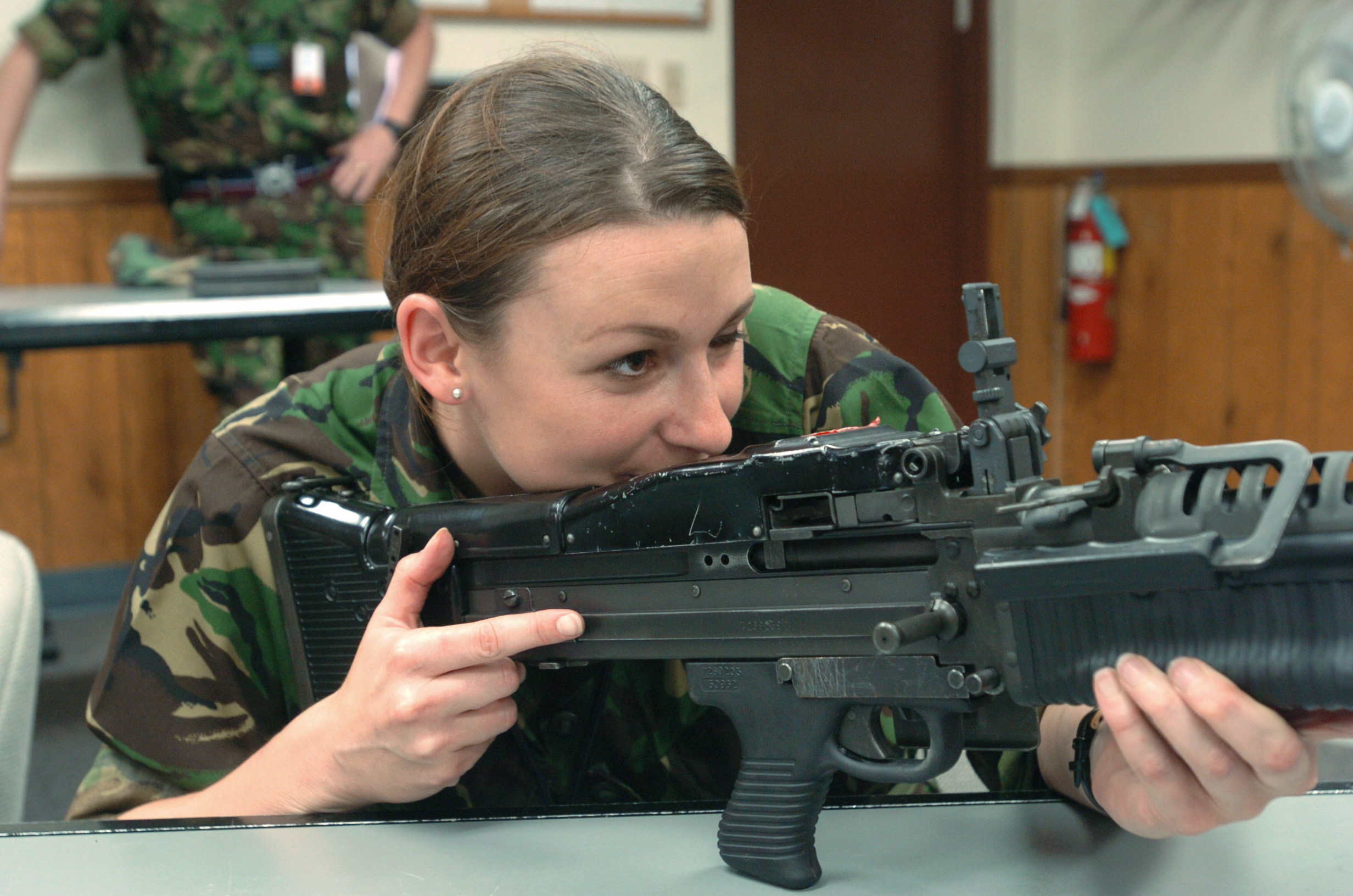
A British Royal Air Force officer handles an M60 during a demonstration for Combined Joint Task Force Exercise (CJTFEX) in 2004.

The M60 is a gas-operated, air-cooled, belt-fed, automatic machine gun that fires from the open-bolt position and is chambered in 7.62×51mm NATO. It has a cyclic rate of fire of around 500–650 rounds per minute (RPM). Ammunition is usually fed into the weapon from a 100 or 250-round disintegrating, metallic split-link belt.

The final design features a quick change barrel to help manage heat during sustained fire. It is fully automatic only. The operating system is a derivation of the one used in the FG-42, which itself was derived from earlier Lewis light machine guns. The operating rod locks and unlocks the rotating bolt via a cam track and also doubles as a linear hammer to fire the gun. It's held back by a simple dropping sear in the fire control group. The belt feed system is similar to the MG 42 and cartridges are pushed forward out of the belt directly into the chamber, unlike the Browning M1919 which pulled cartridges out of the rear of the belt first.

Schematic of a gas cut-off/expansion device used on the M60.

The M60 was developed in parallel with the M14 service rifle and both guns used a very similar gas system. This gas cut off/expansion design was intended to increase the gun's tolerance to differences in ammunition, and worked by feeding gas into holes in a hollow piston which were cut off the moment the action started moving. In this way the hot gasses would drive the cycling of the gun through their continued expansion inside the gas block, and the amount of gas let in would depend on the pressure inside the barrel, creating a self regulating effect. This design carried the accidental possibility that the gas piston could be installed backwards when the gun was stripped for cleaning. In this state, the weapon could chamber a round and fire, but would not cycle.

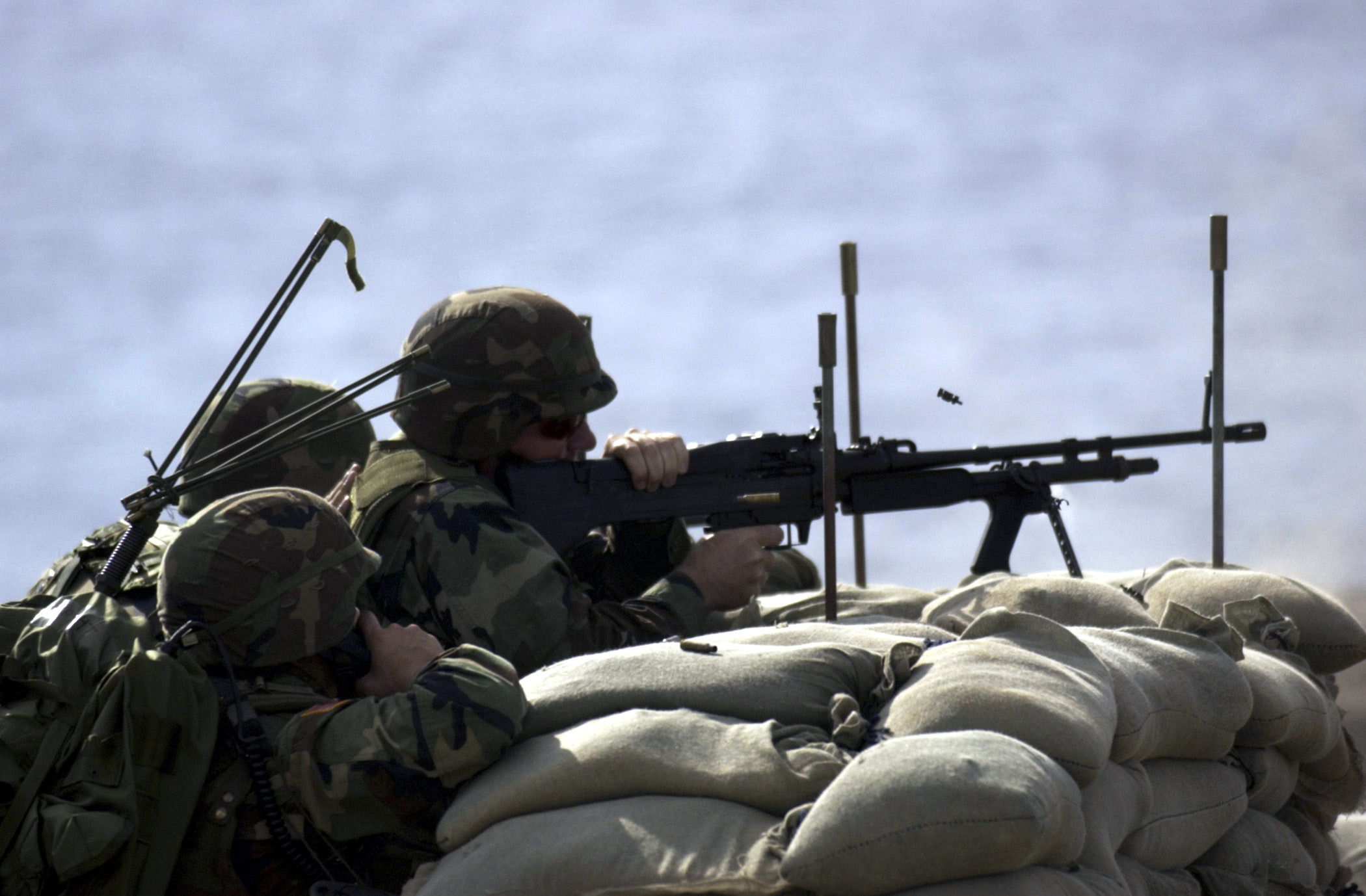
A navy sailor fires an M60E3 machine gun during a live-fire exercise at the Mobile Inshore Underwater Warfare Site (MIUW) at Guantánamo Bay, Cuba in 2003.

The M60 was designed to be able to be effectively fired from the shoulder, hip, or underarm positions. However, to achieve the maximum effective range, it was primarily intended that the weapon be employed from a bipod or a tripod, and the gun fired in bursts of 3–5 rounds.

The M60 is often used with its own integrated bipod or with the M122 tripod. The M60 is considered effective up to 1,100 meters when firing at an area target and mounted on a tripod; up to 800 meters when firing at an area target using the integral bipod; up to 600 meters when firing at a point target; and up to 200 meters when firing at a moving point target. United States Marine Corps doctrine holds that the M60 and other weapons in its class are capable of suppressive fire on area targets out to 1,500 meters if the gunner is sufficiently skilled.

=== Ammunition ===
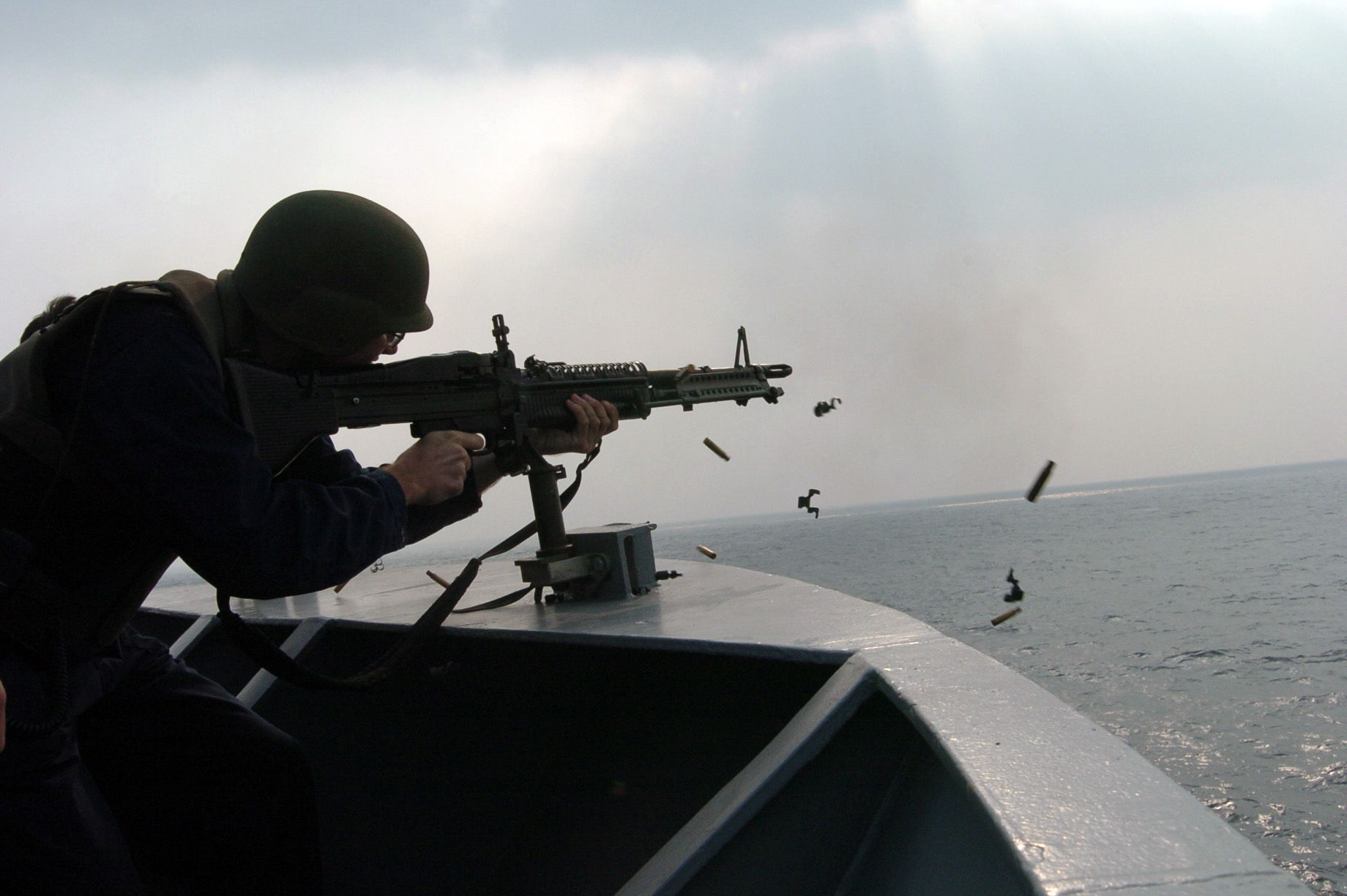
M60 machine gun fired during a small arms familiarization exercise aboard USS Blue Ridge (LCC-19); November 2004.

The M60 family of weapons are capable of firing standard NATO rounds of the appropriate caliber. Most common in U.S. use are M61 armor-piercing, M62 tracer, and M80 Ball. For training purposes, M63 Dummy and M82 blanks are used. Newer tungsten-cored M993 Armor-piercing rounds may also be fired in the M60, though they did not enter the inventory until after the M60 was withdrawn from service in active-duty units.

When firing blanks, the M13 or M13A1 blank-firing adaptor (BFA) is necessary in order to produce enough gas pressure to cycle the weapon with blanks. All ammunition must be fixed in a NATO standard M13 disintegrating metallic split-link belt to feed into the weapon.

The standard combat ammunition mix for the M60 consists of sequences of four ball (M80) cartridges and one tracer (M62) in belts of 100 rounds. The four-to-one ratio theoretically allows the gunner to accurately "walk" the fire into the enemy. Tracer bullets do not fly quite the same trajectory as ball, and the weapon's sights must be used for accurate fire—particularly at ranges in excess of 800 meters, where 7.62×51mm NATO tracer bullets usually burn out and are no longer visible. This is a problem for all weapons in this caliber using this tracer round.

=== Design flaws ===
The M60 was first used in great numbers during the American military intervention in Vietnam. It generally performed well but was not without some criticism. It famously received the nickname "The Pig" from soldiers who had to carry them in the tropical heat.

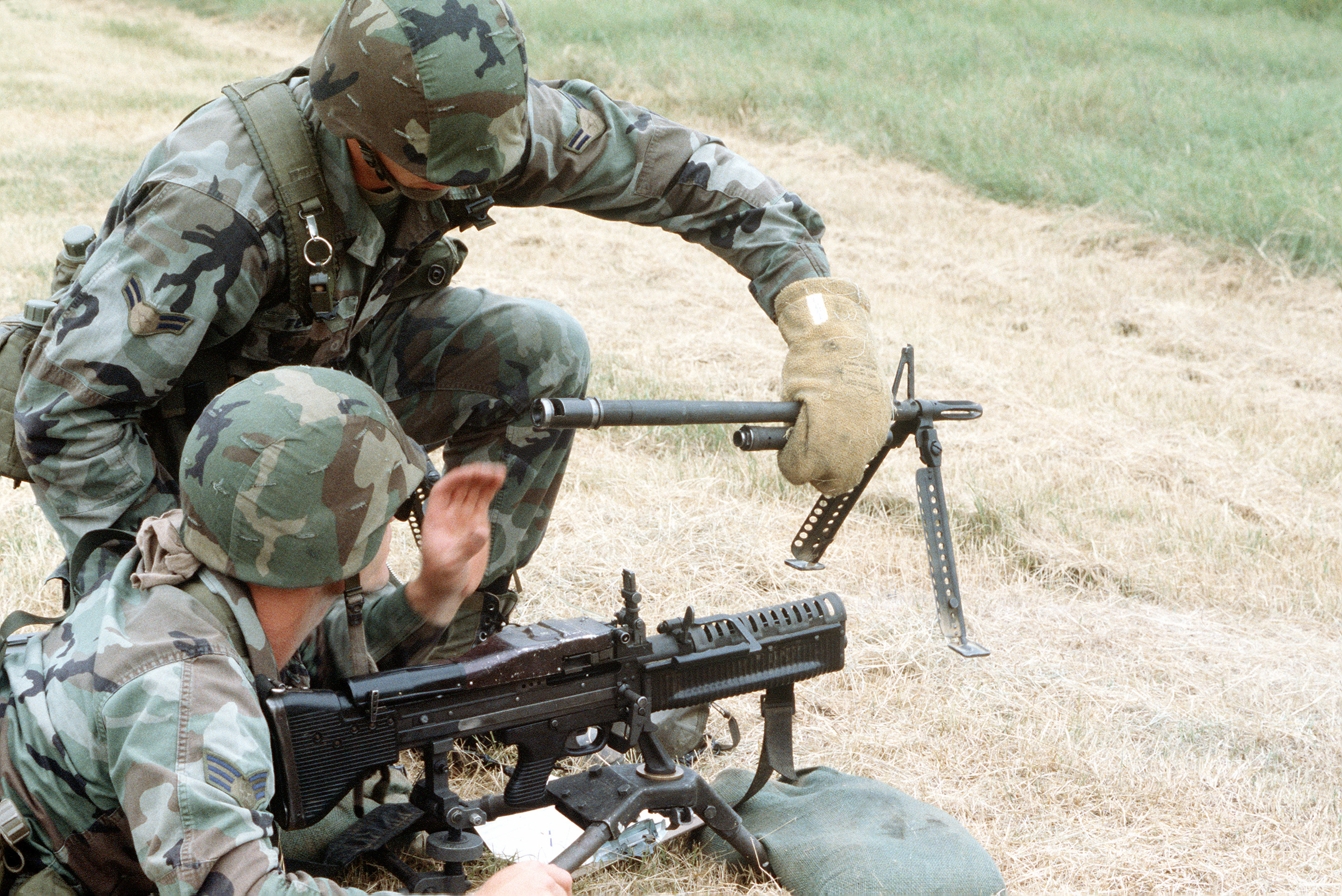
The M60 machine gun crew member responsible for hot barrel changes uses protective asbestos gloves to prevent burns to the hands.

This stemmed from the weapon's weight; though the M60 was among the lightest 7.62 mm machine guns of the era, the weapon was poorly balanced and thus awkward to carry for long periods. The single most common complaint was that the M60 was unreliable in extreme conditions and prone to jamming and other malfunctions during heavy firing, especially when it was dirty. Sometimes spent casings would fail to extract and stay stuck inside the chamber, forcing a barrel change before it could be fired again.

Due to the rotating bolt design, the M60 required stoning of burrs or roughness on the lugs, which could increase headspace, occasionally causing cartridge case stretching and head separation. This required replacement of the bolt. The M60 sometimes (depending on the version) tore off the rims from fired cartridge cases during the extraction cycle, causing a jam that required a cleaning rod to be rammed down the barrel to extract the torn cartridge, a potentially deadly procedure while under fire in combat. The barrel latch mechanism (a swinging lever) could catch on the gunner's equipment and accidentally unlatch, causing the barrel to fall out of the gun. On new M60s, the lever was replaced with a push button mechanism that was less likely to be accidentally released, but few of the older M60s were modified due to expense, with many of the extant weapons still bearing them.

The grip/trigger housing assembly is held in place with a rather fragile leaf spring clip instead of the captive pins used in other designs. The spring clip has been known to be prone to breakage since the first trials at Aberdeen Proving Ground. Duct tape and cable ties have been seen on M60s in the field, placed there by their crews in case the spring clip breaks. The sear in the trigger mechanism gained a reputation for wearing down, and a malfunction could cause the gun to "run away". A second sear notch was eventually added to the operating rod to reduce the chance of this happening.

== Variants ==
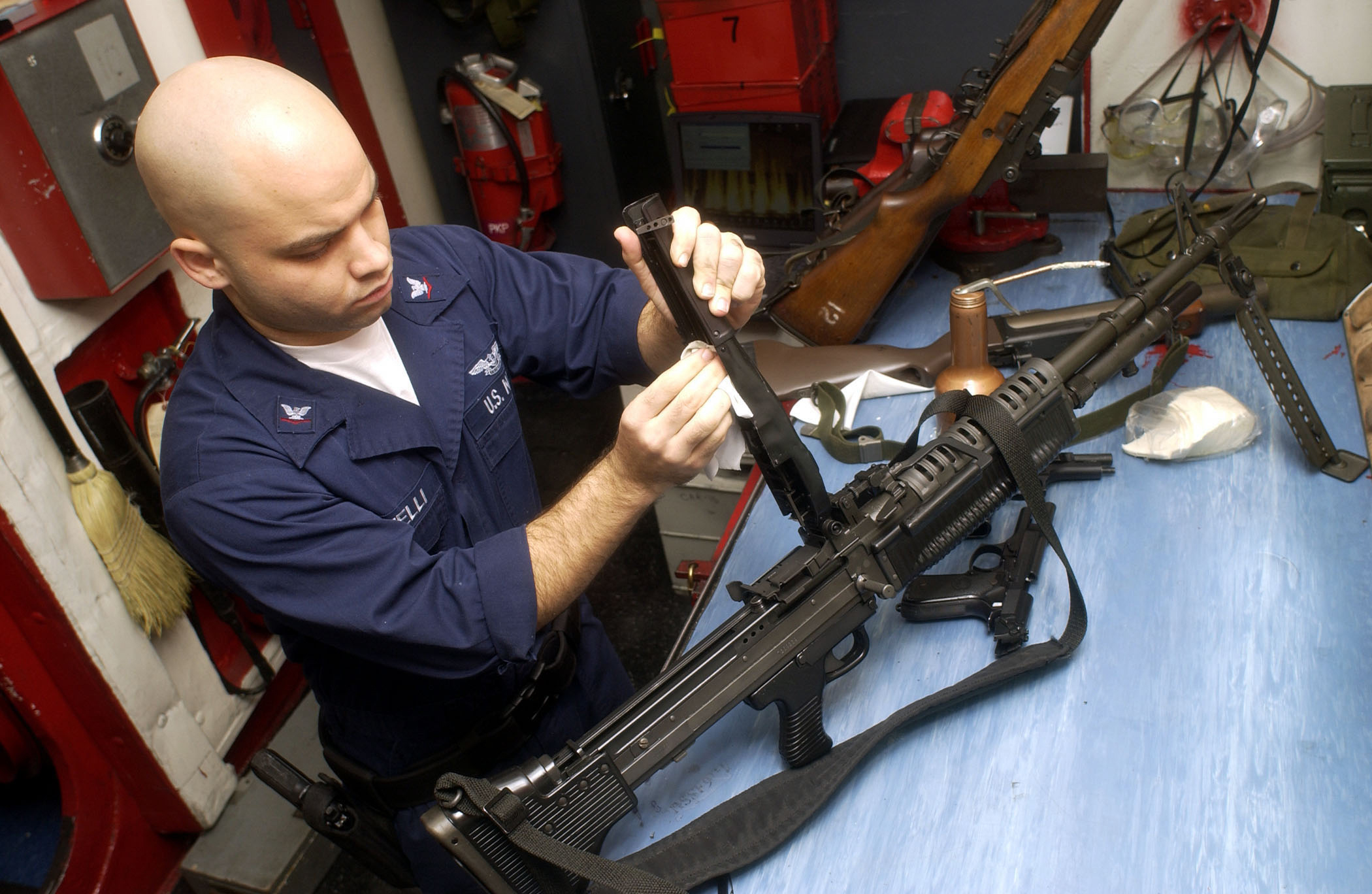
A Gunner's Mate 3rd Class cleans and performs preventative maintenance on an M60 machine gun on the USS Constellation (CV-64), December 2002.

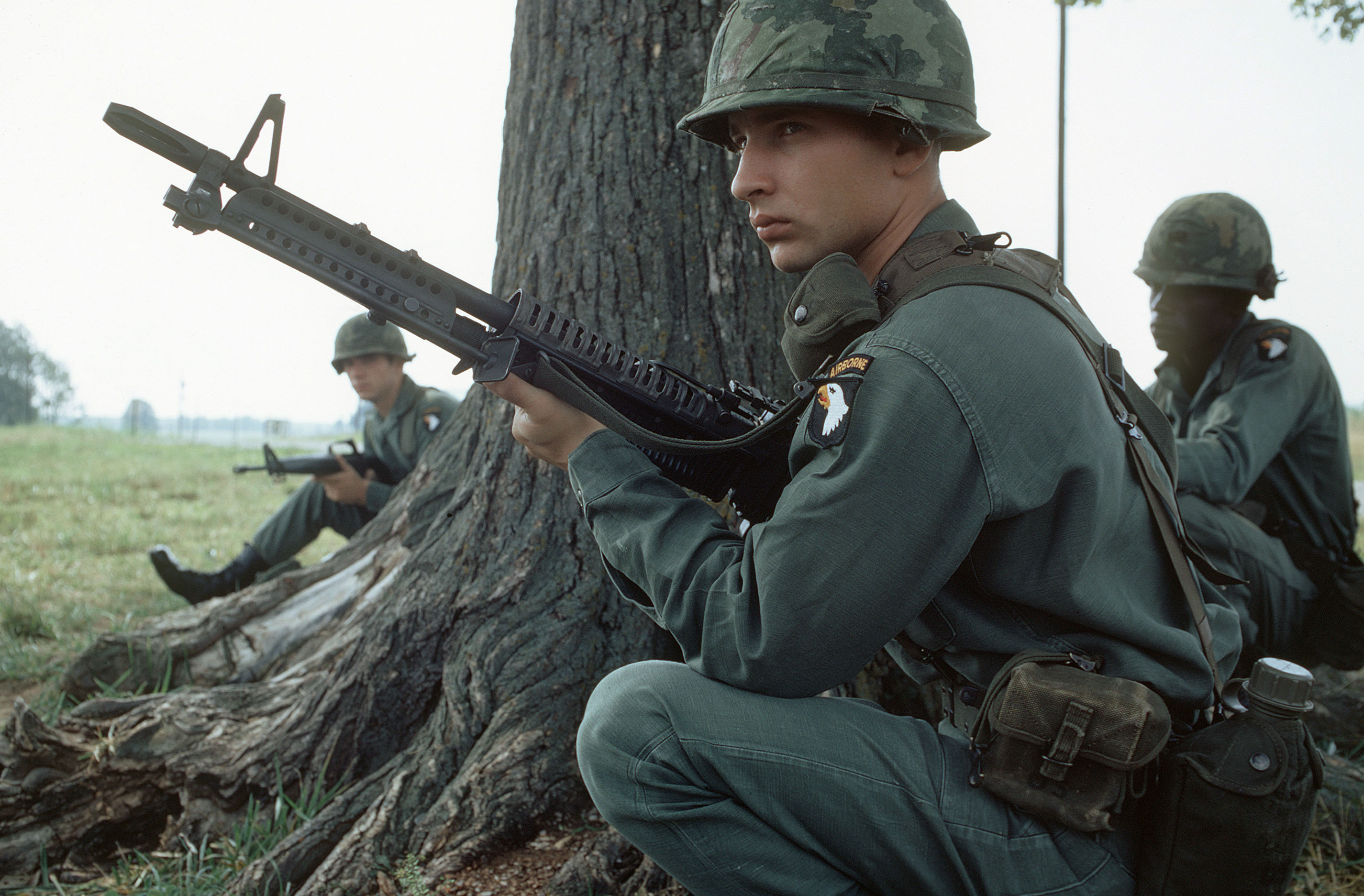
A member of the 101st Airborne Division, armed with an M60 machine gun, participates in a field exercise in 1972.

The nomenclature M60 describes either the first adopted variant or, generically, the family of weapons were derived from it. Major variations include the M60E1 (an improved variant that did not enter production), the M60E2 (a variant designed to be used from fixed mounts as a co-axial for armored vehicles or in helicopter armament systems), the M60E3 (a lightweight variant) and the M60E4 (another improved variant, designated as the Mk 43 Mod 0 by the U.S. Navy).

The M60C was adopted for use on fixed mounts on aircraft. It was characterized by the use of an electric solenoid to operate the trigger and a hydraulic system to charge the weapon. The M60D differed from the base model by employing spade grips, a different sighting system, and lacking a forearm. It was typically employed as a door gun on helicopters or as a pintle-mounted weapon as on the Type 88 K1 tank.

There are many smaller variants among each type, between makers of the firearm, and over time.

=== Variant summary ===
- T161: The M60's developmental designation before it was type-classified in the 1950s.
- M60: The basic model, type-classified in 1957.
- M60E1: An improved variant that did not enter production. The primary difference was the handle fixed to the barrel and the removal of the gas cylinder and bipod from the barrel assembly. The feed cover can be closed when the gun is not cocked (bolt forward).
- M60E2: Used in vehicles as a coaxial machine gun; electrically fired.
- M60B: Used in helicopters in the 1960s and 1970s; unmounted.
- M60C: Used in fixed mounts in aircraft in the 1960s and 1970s; electrically fired and hydraulically charged.
- M60D: Replaced the M60B; a pintle-mounted variant used especially in armament subsystem for helicopters, but also some other roles.
- CAR60: Lightweight upgrade kit from Rock Island Armory in the 1980s.
- M60E3: An updated, lightweight variant adopted in the 1980s.
- M60E4 (Mk 43 Mod 0/1): An improved variant of the 1990s that looks similar to the M60E3, but has many improvements. It has subvariants of its own and is also used by the U.S. Navy (as the Mk 43 Mod 0/1). The Mk 43 Mod 1 is a specialized variant with additions such as extra rails for mounting accessories.
- M60E6: A lightened and improved variant of the M60E4.

=== M60 ===
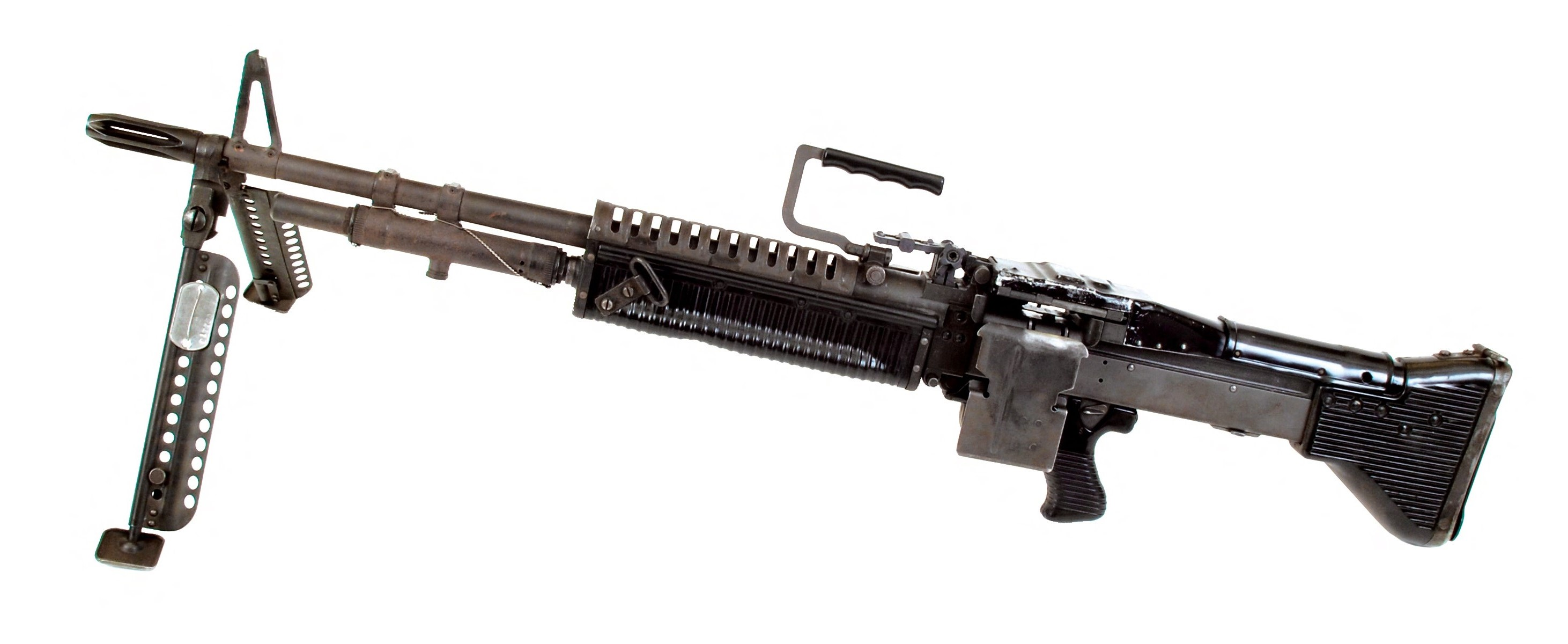
M60 with bipod extended

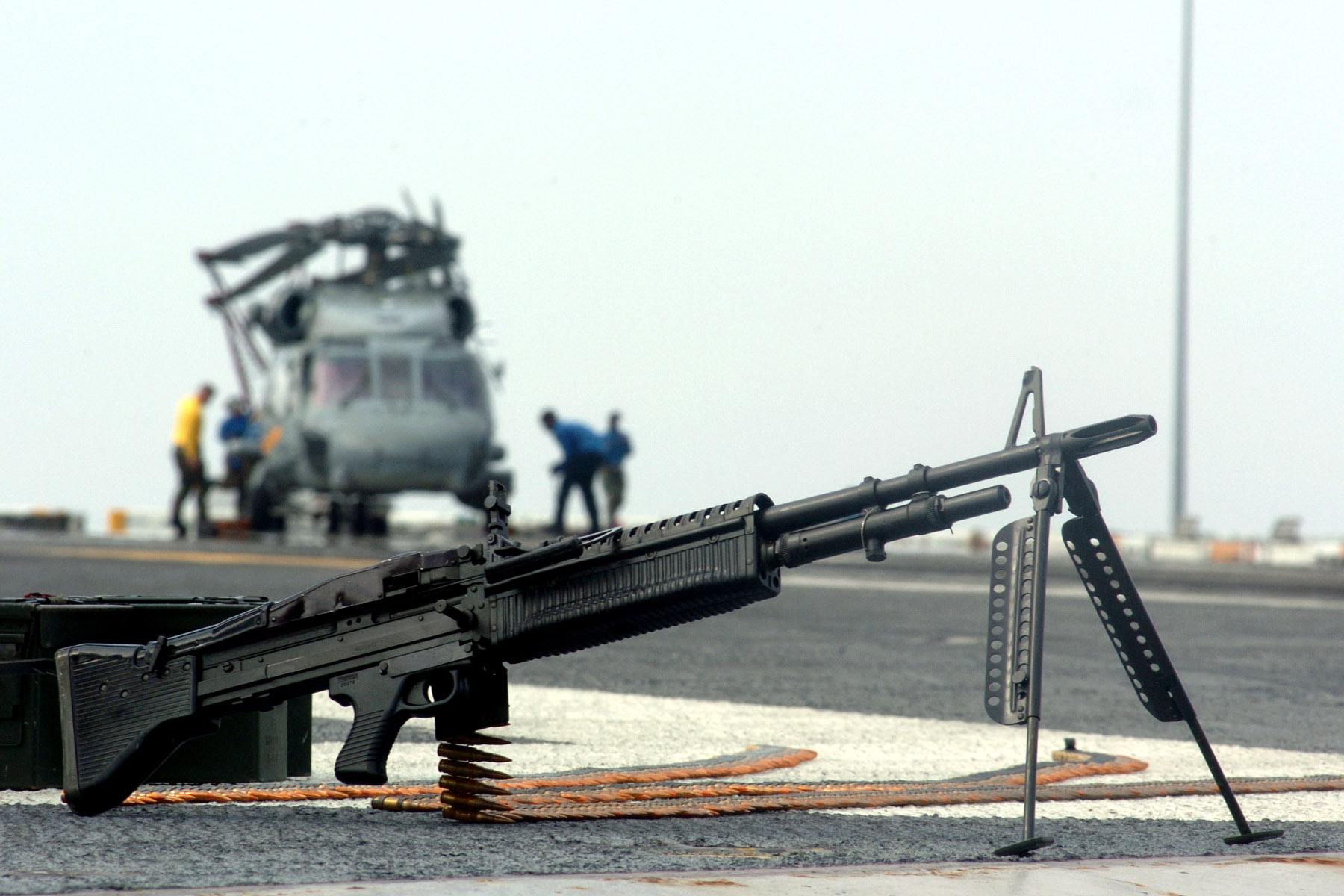
M60 on the deck of USS Theodore Roosevelt (CVN-71) in 2006

The initial variant was officially adopted by the U.S. Army in the late 1950s, though at this time it was only intended for the infantry. It was known as the T161 before it was adopted (specifically the T161E3) and was chosen over the competing T52 during testing in the 1950s. They both used a similar feed and were both gas-operated, but the T161 was easier to produce and its different internals performed better. The model that won the competition was the T161E3.

The model was type-classified in 1957 and entered production. It saw its first heavy use in the 1960s. The basic design has undergone some smaller changes and has been produced by different manufacturers.

=== M60E1 ===
The M60E1 was the first major variant of the original M60. It did not go into full-scale production, though many of its features were included in the later E3 and E4 variants. Some of its features were also incorporated into the existing M60 production. This mainly changed how the gas cylinder, the barrel, and the bipod were connected in the first iteration. The M60 and the M60E1 are two different versions. Opinions vary on whether the M60E1 was officially adopted.

One of the more noticeable changes on the M60E1 is that the bipod attachment point was moved to the gas tube rather than the barrel (like on the later M60E3). It did not, however, have a forward pistol grip, as was added on the E3 variant. The feed cover can be closed when the gun is not cocked (bolt forward).

=== M60E2 ===
An M60E2 machine gun, intended for co-axial use. Note the gas tube extension and the lack of a pistol grip.

The M60E2 is used on armored fighting vehicles, such as the M48A5, later M60 Patton tanks and the K1 Type 88. It lacks many of the external components of the standard M60, including stock and grips. The M60E2 was electrically fired, but had a manual trigger as a backup, as well as a metal loop at the back for charging. The gas tube below the barrel was extended to the full length of the weapon to vent the gas outside the vehicle. This version achieved a mean time between failures of 1,669 during testing in the 1970s.

The M60E2 is used on the South Korea's K1 Type 88 tank as a co-axial weapon, along with an M60D on a pintle mount.

=== M60B ===
The M60B was a short-lived variant designed to be fired from helicopters, with limited deployment made in the 1960s and 1970s. Nicknamed the "Free Gun" by aircrew door gunners, it was not mounted, just held, and was soon replaced by the pintle-mounted M60D. The 'B' model differed most noticeably in that it had no bipod and featured a different rear stock than the regular model. It still had a pistol grip (as opposed to spade grips). The M60B's advantage over pintle-mounted variants was that it had a wider and much less restricted field of fire.

An unusual arrangement of the M60B was done by HA(L)-3 squadron aircrew by removing the sights, shortening the barrel inline to the gas block, removing the stock to shorten the receiver as the shorter buffer spring increased the rate of fire, an improvised side mounted grip was installed on the handguard. This arrangement allowed the door gunners easier movement of the weapon as well as firing sideways improved the belt feed performance.

=== M60C ===
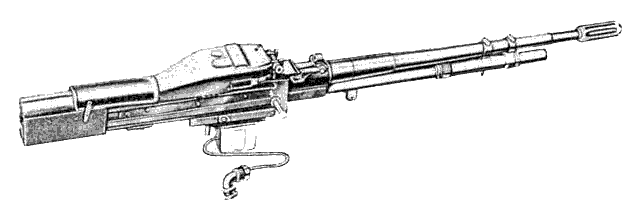
An M60C machine gun with no iron sights, pistol grip or bipod

The M60C is a variant of the standard M60 for aircraft mounting, such as in helicopter armament subsystems. It lacks things like the bipod, pistol grip, and iron sights. The main difference between the standard M60 and the "C" variant is the electronic control system and the hydraulic swivel system used. It could be fired from the cockpit by the pilot or co-pilot. It is an electronically controlled, hydraulic-powered, air-cooled, gas-operated, belt-fed weapon system. It used the M2, M6, and M16 armament subsystems and was mounted on the OH-13 Sioux, the OH-23 Raven, the UH-1B Huey, and comprised the standard fixed armament of the OV-10 Bronco. M60C production was on the order of several hundred. It was also used in the XM19 gun pod.

=== M60D ===
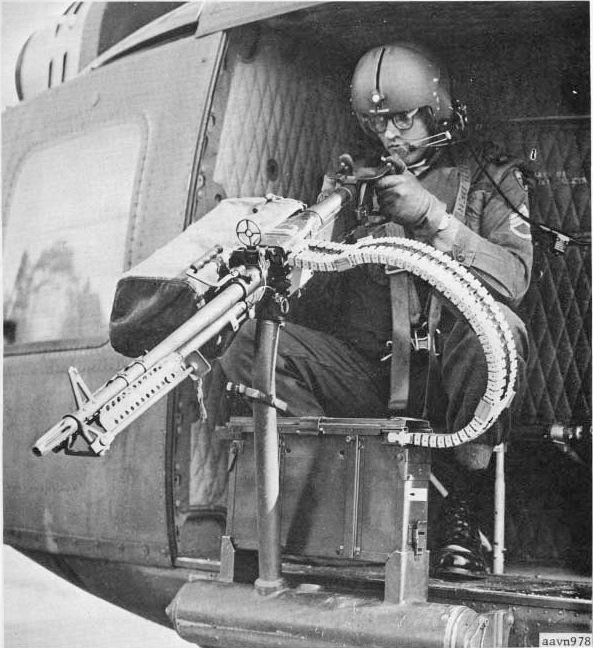
An M60D machine gun in the M23 Armament Subsystem mounted on a UH-1D/H helicopter.

The M60D is a mounted variant of the standard M60. It can be mounted on boats, vehicles and as a pintle-mounted door gun in helicopters. When used in aircraft, it differs from the M60C in that it is not controlled by the pilot—rather, it is mounted in a door and operated by a member of the crew. Like the rest of the M60 family, it is an air-cooled, gas-operated, belt-fed weapon. Unlike other models, however, the M60D normally has spade grips and an aircraft ring-type sight or similar, as well as an improved ammunition feed system. A canvas bag is also affixed to the gun to capture ejected casings and links, preventing them from being sucked into the rotor blades or into an engine intake. The M60D was equipped on the UH-1D/H Huey (using the M23, XM29, M59, and the Sagami mounts), the CH-47 Chinook (using the M24 and M41 mounts) in both door and ramp locations, the ACH-47A "Guns-A-Go-Go" variant of the Chinook (using the XM32 and XM33 mounts), and on the UH-60 Black Hawk (using the M144 mount). The M60D is also used by the British on Royal Air Force Chinooks. In US service, the M60D has been primarily replaced by the M240H. The M60D is still manufactured by U.S. Ordnance and still used on the SH-60 Seahawk.

=== CAR60 ===
Rock Island Arsenal introduced an M60 upgrade package in 1983 to any existing model to make the weapon more lightweight and easier for a soldier to handle. The upgrade package came with a shorter/lightweight fluted barrel, M14 bipod on gas block and M16 vertical foregrip attachment on gas piston tube. Although this upgrade was an improvement over the original M60, it was replaced in 1985 by the Saco Defense M60E3 which was deemed superior to the RIA CAR60.

=== M60E3 ===
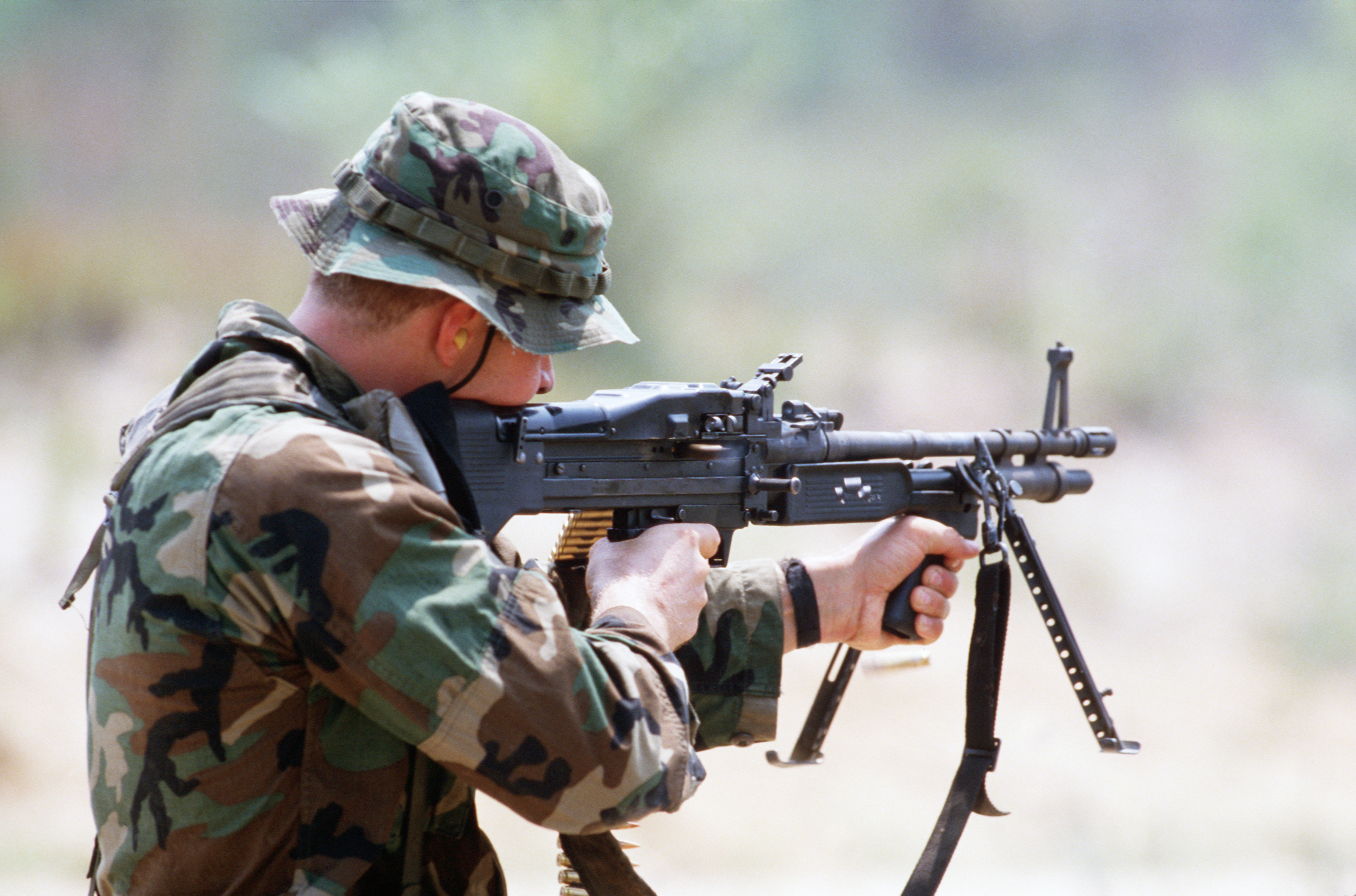
Navy SEAL team member fires an M60E3 from the shoulder during a field training exercise in 1987.

The M60E3 was fielded c. 1986 in an attempt to remedy problems with earlier versions of the M60 for infantry use. It is a lightweight, "improved" variant intended to reduce the load carried by the gunner. Unlike its predecessors, the M60E3 has several updated modern features. It has a bipod (attached to the receiver) for improved stability, ambidextrous safety, universal sling attachments, a carrying handle on the barrel, and a simplified gas system. However, these features also caused almost as many problems for the weapon as they fixed. There were different types of barrels used, but the lightweight barrel was not as safe for sustained fire at 200 rounds per minute as heavier types. Despite this, some personnel claim to have witnessed successful prolonged firing of the weapon. The stellite superalloy barrel liner makes it possible, but the excessive heat generated by this process may quickly render the gun unusable. There were two main barrels, a lightweight barrel and another heavier type—the former for when lighter weight was desired, and the latter for situations where more sustained fire was required.

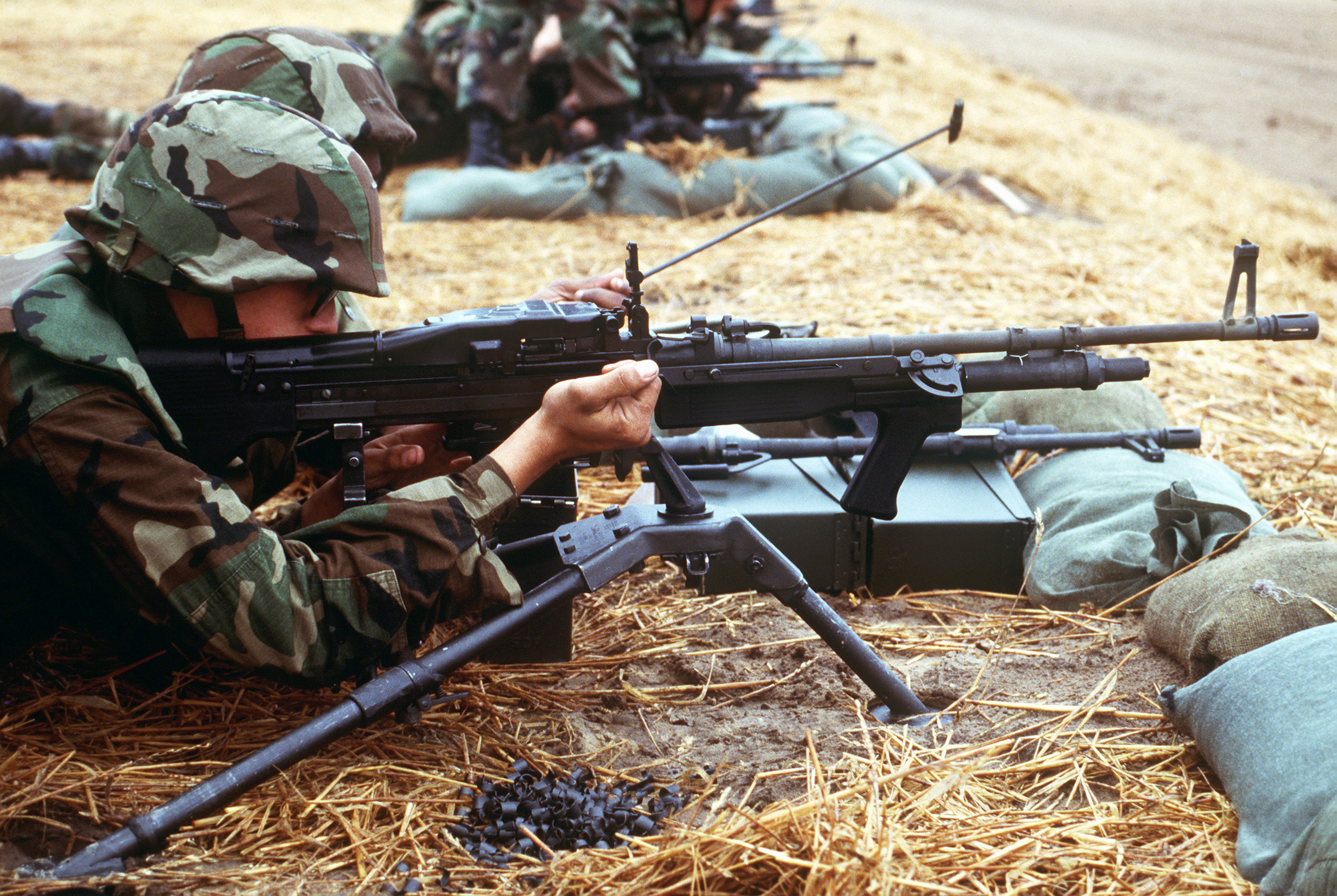
A recruit pulls back the bolt of an M60E3 machine gun during a weapons familiarization class. The weapon is mounted on a tripod with a traversing and elevation mechanism attached.

The reduced-weight components also reduced the durability of the weapon, making it more prone to rapid wear and parts breakage than the original. Most infantry units in the U.S. Army and Marine Corps have now switched over to the M240 as their general-purpose machine gun, which is more reliable (particularly when dirty) and seems to be well liked by the troops for its ruggedness, despite the fact that it weighs 27.6 lb (12.5 kg) compared to the standard M60 at 23.15 lb (10.5 kg).

U.S. Navy SEALs continued to use the "CAR-60" (M60E3) version due to its lighter weight and slower rate of fire, which allows a more effective duration of fire with allowable levels of ammunition carried.

The U.S. Air Force Security Forces received the M60E3 from 1988 to 1989. All USAF M60E3s were withdrawn from general issue by 1990, because it did not meet the vehicle mount requirements of the Cadillac Gage Ranger and due to overheating problems. The M60E3 did remain in the Air Force as weapons converted back to M60 configuration with the E3 X-stamped via locally installed kits issued from depot. The Air Force cut the barrel change times, sustained fire 100 rounds per minute change barrel every 10 minutes (M60) to five minutes (M60E3), and rapid fire 200 rounds per minute change barrel every five minutes to two minutes.

=== M60E4/Mk 43 Mod 0/1 ===
The M60E4 or Mk 43 is a 7.62×51mm NATO general-purpose machine gun. Evolved from the M60 machine gun series, it has several improvements over the originals. The M60E4/Mk 43 series includes the Mod 0 and Mod 1 configurations. It is the primary light machine gun used in some NATO countries and other U.S. Government export-approved countries. The Mk 43 machine gun currently is manufactured solely by U.S. Ordnance (USORD). USORD has produced it since 2000.

The M60E4/Mk 43 is one of the modernized variants in the generations of the old M60 family and incorporates a number of improvements over past versions. Externally, it looks somewhat like the M60E3, but it has many internal changes and improvements that modernize the effectiveness and reliability of this weapon. In general it is a more reliable weapon than all previous M60s. Externally, it features a different forward grip, iron sights, butt stock and bipod. The M60E4/Mk 43 has higher pull for the belt, and is available in a variety of configurations. Older M60 models can be upgraded with a conversion kit manufactured by U.S. Ordnance to the M60E4/Mk 43. The M60E4/Mk 43 were primarily developed in the 1990s and have continued to be redeveloped in the 2000s (decade). Early Mk 43s had some distinct differences from the E4 (such as a duckbill flash suppressor), though by the 2000s these distinctions seemed to have ended.

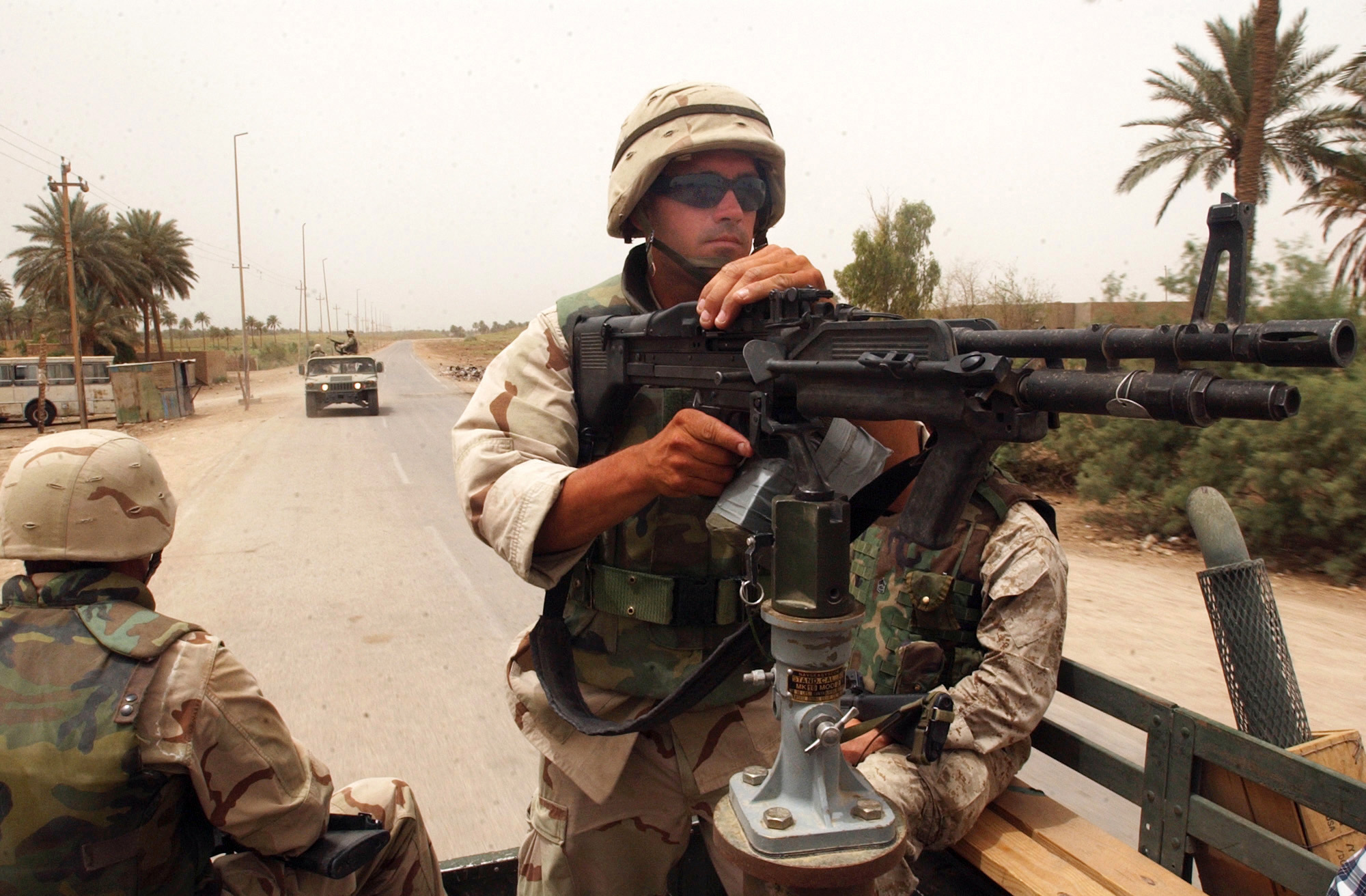
A mounted Mk 43 Mod 0 (M60E4) (later model) is crewed by a Seabee of NMCB-15 (Naval Mobile Construction Battalion), on a convoy in Iraq in May 2003.

The Navy has designated this weapon as the Mk 43 Mod 0. It was developed for the U.S. Navy SEALs to replace their existing stock of M60E3 machine guns fitted with shorter "assault barrels". These weapons are identical to standard M60E4s, with the exception of the barrel length, and can be used either as suppressive fire or direct fire weapons. The Mk 43 Mod 1 adds significantly more rail attachment points to the weapon's receiver cover and handguard.

U.S. Ordnance's website states in their FAQ, as of 2005, that the "M60E4 and the Mk 43 are the same weapon system". The M60E4 and Mk 43 variants in the past were roughly similar, although they are part of the same family. While it might be fair to say that the Mk 43s are a type of M60E4, there are technical differences between any given M60E4 model. Early Mk 43s have certain differences over M60E4 from the same period, the most obvious being the duck-bill flash hider and different handguard. This difference is no longer seen on the current Mk 43s still manufactured by U.S. Ordnance.

In Army trials during the 1990s the M60E4 produced by Saco Defense was pitted against the M240E4 (then called) produced by FN for a new medium machine gun to be used by the infantry. The competition was to replace the decades-old M60s. The M240E4 won, and was then classified as the M240B. While the M240B had been more reliable in the tests, it was noted to be a heavier weapon than the M60E4.

The M60E4/Mk 43 is a modern update to the entire series, such that it is also available in many of the previous configurations, such as a co-axial weapon. Kits are offered to convert older models to the E4 standard.

- M60E4 (light machine gun):
  - Short barrel: weight: 22.5 lb (10.2 kg); length: 37.7 in (95.8 cm)
  - Long barrel: weight: 23.1 lb (10.5 kg); length: 42.4 in (108 cm)
  - Assault barrel: weight: 21.3 lb (9.66 kg); length: 37.0 in (94.0 cm)
  - Width: 4.8 in (12.2 cm)
- M60E4 (mounted):
  - Length: 43.5 in (110 cm)
  - Width: 5.9 in (15.0 cm)
  - Weight: 22.7 lb (10.3 kg)
- M60E4 (co-axial):
  - Length: 42.3 in (107 cm)
  - Width: 4.8 in (12.2 cm)
  - Weight: 21.2 lb (9.62 kg)

==== Design details ====
The M60E4/Mk 43 is a gas-operated, disintegrating-link, belt-fed, air-cooled machine gun that fires from an open bolt. It is the newest, upgraded variant of the M60 series machine guns. It fires a 7.62×51mm NATO cartridge, which offers accuracy, reliability, and stopping power. It fires at a cyclic rate of around 500 to 600 rounds per minute, with an effective distance of 1200 yards (1100 meters). The weapon's controllable, yet lethal, rate of fire allows for accurate firing in the standing, kneeling and prone positions.

The M60E4/Mk 43 is ambidextrous, and shares its parts with all previous M60 configurations, including vehicle mounts. The adjustable front sight allows for zeroing of the primary and spare barrel, the chrome and induction hardening lengthens service life, and the ammunition is now mounted on the receiver, preventing damage, and thereby feed failure. The machine gun's light weight—20 to 21 pounds (9 to 10 kilograms)—and compact design make it easy to carry long distances and maneuver in tight spaces. It also allows for the weapon to be fired from the shoulder accurately.

The M60E4/Mk 43 Mod 0, typically used as an infantry machine gun, features an injection-molded composite handguard. The weapon system's quick-change barrel is crucial for safety and efficiency, particularly when the operator is under fire. With the lightweight bipod mounted to the receiver, the barrel can be changed without removing the bipod.

The M60E4/Mk 43 Mod 1 has multiple M1913 rail mounting points for mounting optics, aiming lasers, and accessories for around-the-clock capability. It mounts directly or adapts to all standard NATO tripod and vehicle mounts.

Barrels are stellite lined for sustained fire and extended barrel life. They are available in short, long and heavy fluted configurations for use in various applications. All major components of the M60E4/Mk 43 directly interchange with other M60 configurations. U.S. Ordnance manufactures a conversion kit that upgrades older M60s to its M60E4/Mk 43 model.

=== M60E6 ===
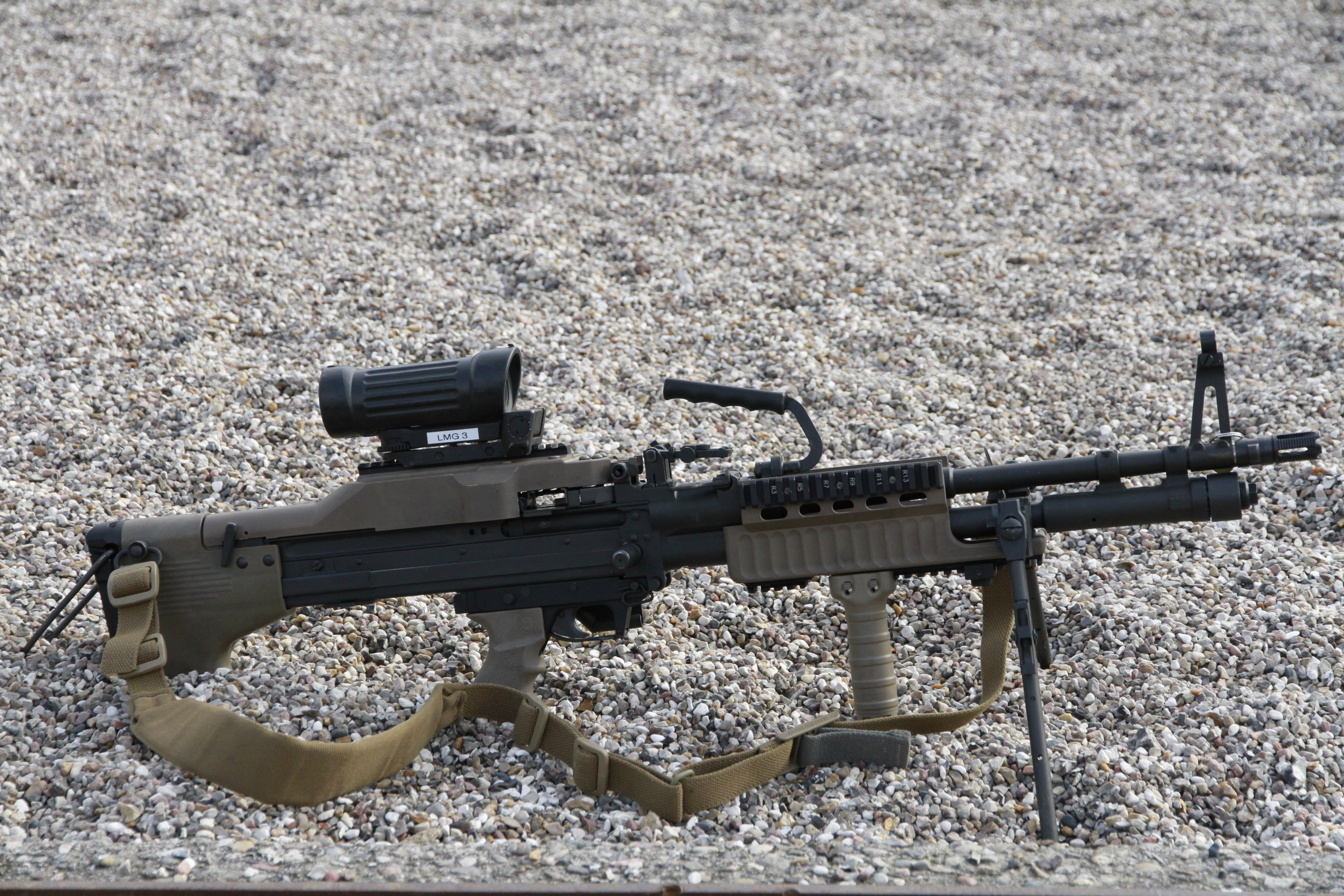
An M60E6 machine gun adopted by the Danish Army, designated as the LMG M/60 with C79 LMG Optic

The M60E6 is an improvement on the M60E4 and the latest M60 variant. It won against the HK121 in the Danish Army's GPMG replacement program to replace the M/62 in March 2014. The weight has been reduced to 9.27 kg (20.4 lb), 2.23 kg (4.9 lb) lighter than the M/62. Its rate of fire of around 500–650 rounds per minute (RPM) is significantly less than the Danish M/62's 1,200 RPM, but it allows for better control, greater accuracy, more conservation of ammunition, more versatile firing positions, and less risk of collateral damage from losing control while shooting. The M60E6 features a redesigned quick-change barrel assembly with an offset barrel handle, which is also used to carry the weapon and allows for the replacement of a hot barrel without using protective gloves. Changes to the rail system and bipod have been made, and a significant number of internal improvements have also increased reliability.

==== Danish C79 LMG Optic ====
The Danish military uses a 3.4×28 optical sight mounted on top of the receiver which can be set from 300 to 800 meters (328 to 875 yd) in 100 meters (109 yd) increments on their M/60E6. What sets the Danish C79 LMG Optic designated as M/98 apart from the standard C79 optical sight is its unique reticle of a chevron with a height of 12,5 TS and two TS line left and right with a length of 7,5 TS beginning 2,5 TS away from the tip of the chevron. The sight is designated as M/99 also available in a night vision configuration.

=== Civilian variants ===
A number of semi-automatic only variants have been produced for the civilian market in the United States. The internals have been extensively modified to make it essentially impossible to convert them to fire in fully automatic. If the design is approved by the U.S. Bureau of Alcohol, Tobacco, Firearms and Explosives (BATFE), they are treated as belt-fed semi-automatic rifles; however, individual state and local regulations still apply.

There are a variety of M60 models, some that have been upgraded to the current M60E4 configuration, on the market as well, but they are heavily regulated and restricted by the National Firearms Act, and they cost over $40,000, with some models, such as a Maremont/SACO upgraded to M60E6 configuration costing as much as $65,000.

== Users ==
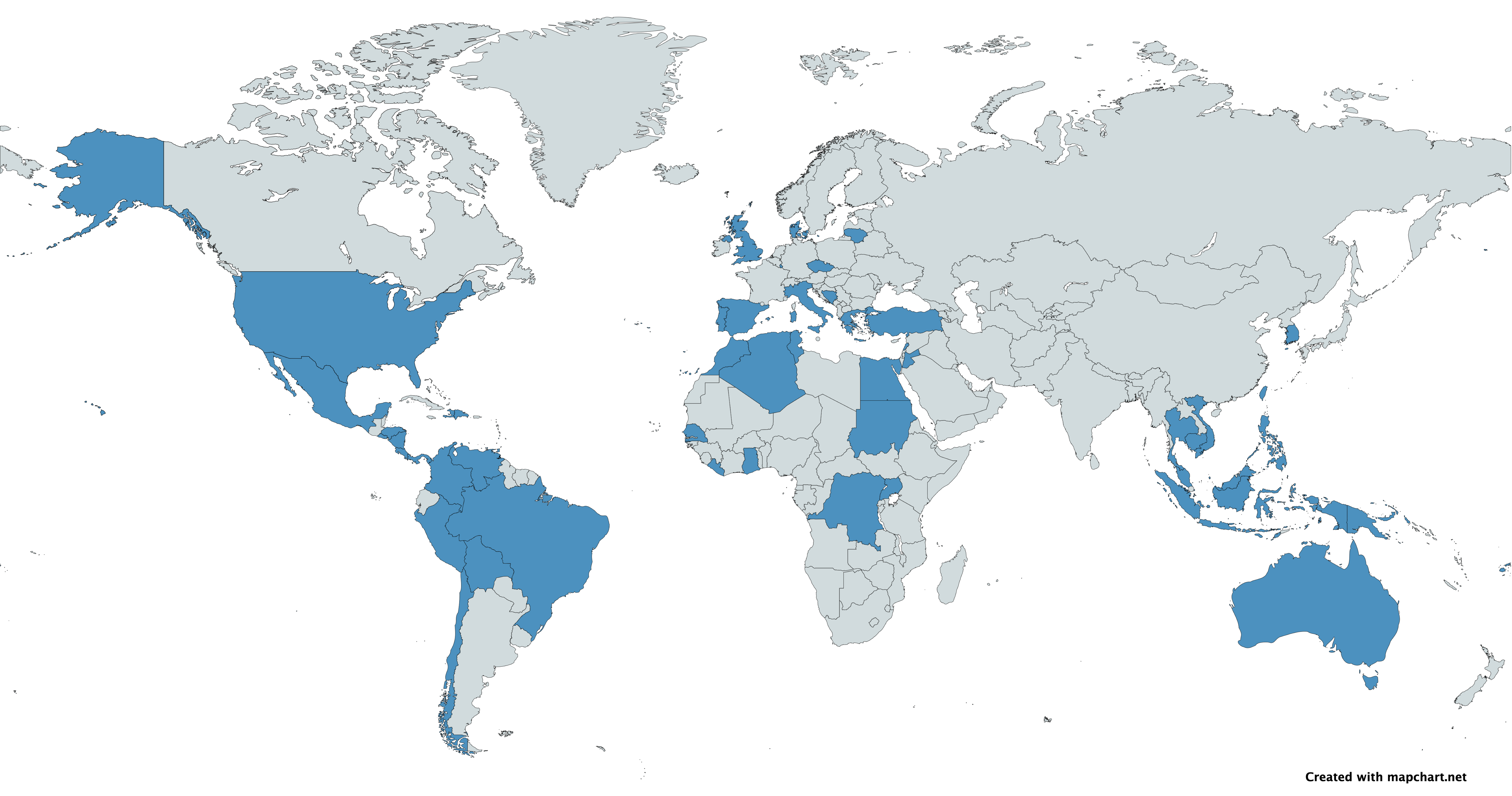
Map of M60 users in blue

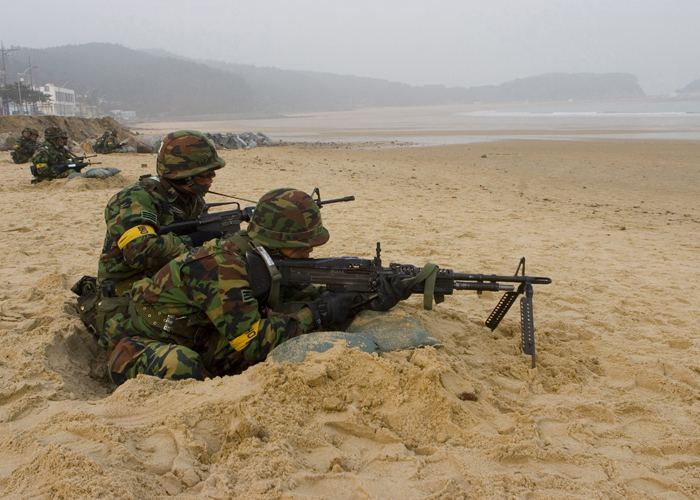
South Korean soldiers with an M60 conduct combined amphibious landing during Foal Eagle 07.

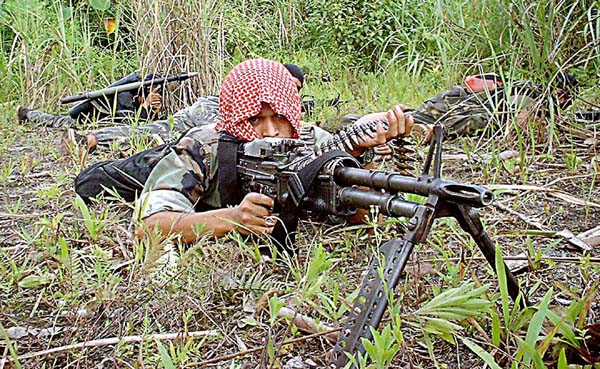
Moro Islamic Liberation Front militant lying prone with an M60.

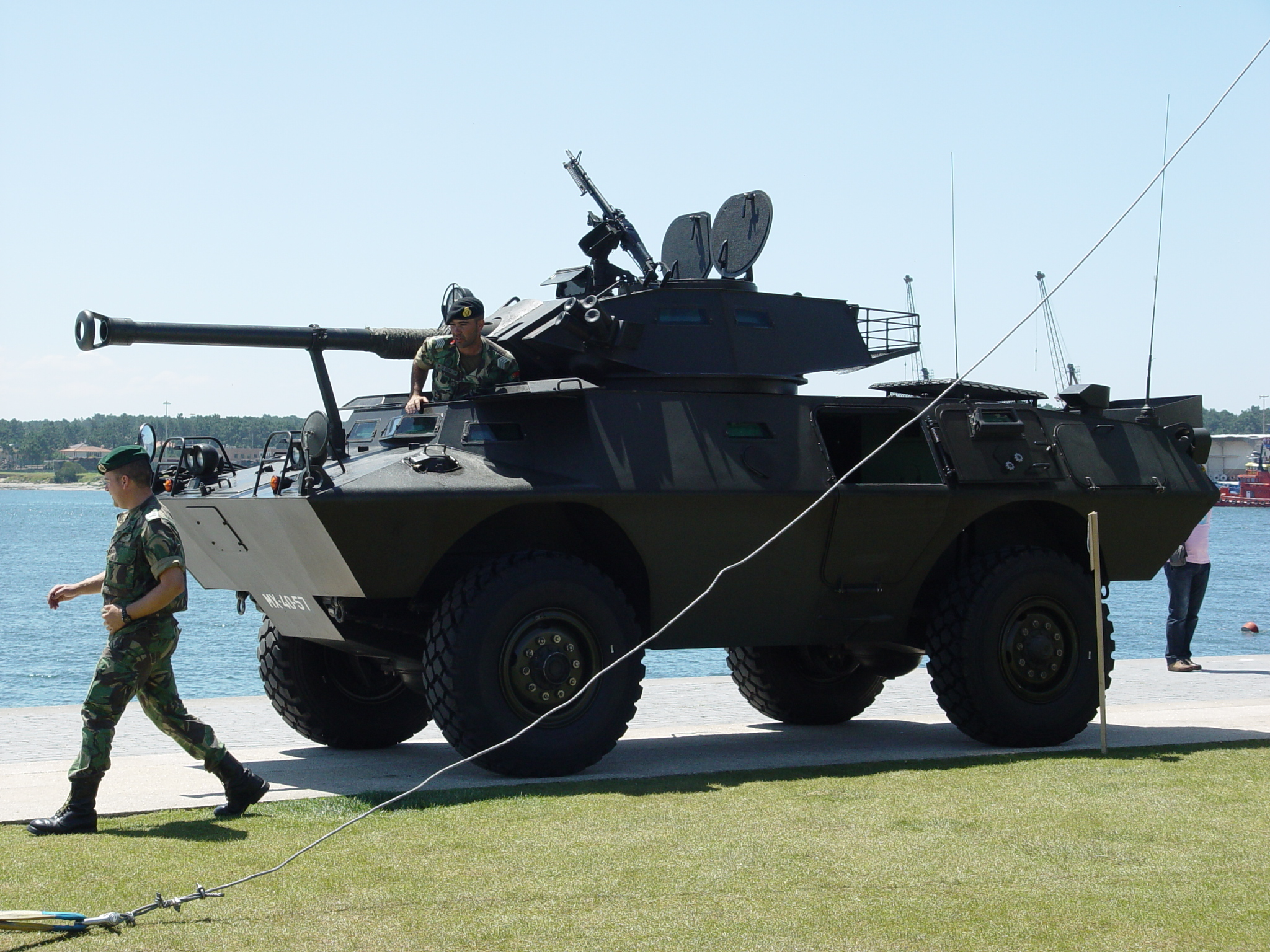
Portuguese Army V-150 Commando armed with an M60D.

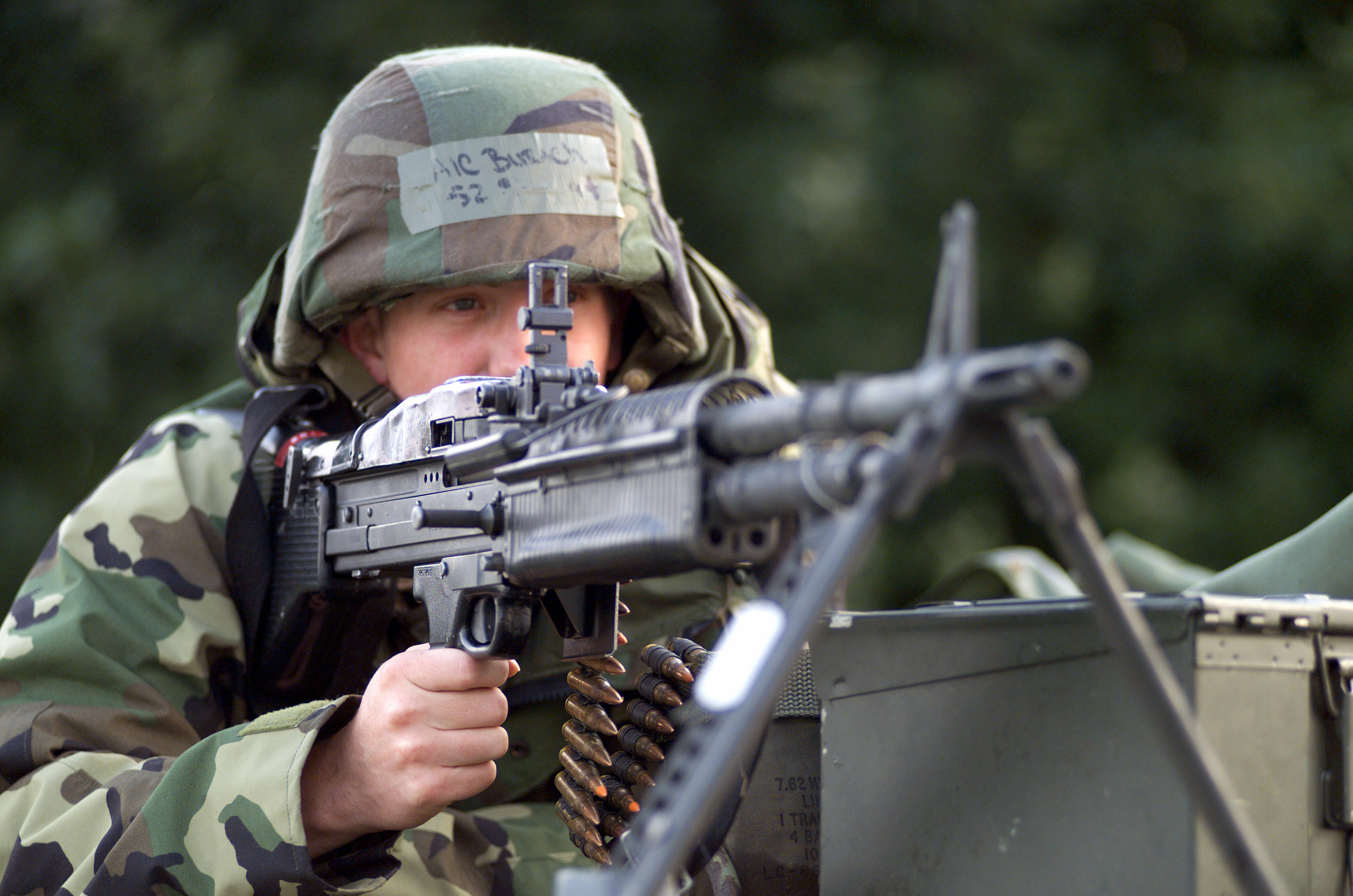
U.S. airman with an M60, assigned to the 52nd Security Forces Squadron (SFS), at Spangdahlem Air Base (AB), Germany.

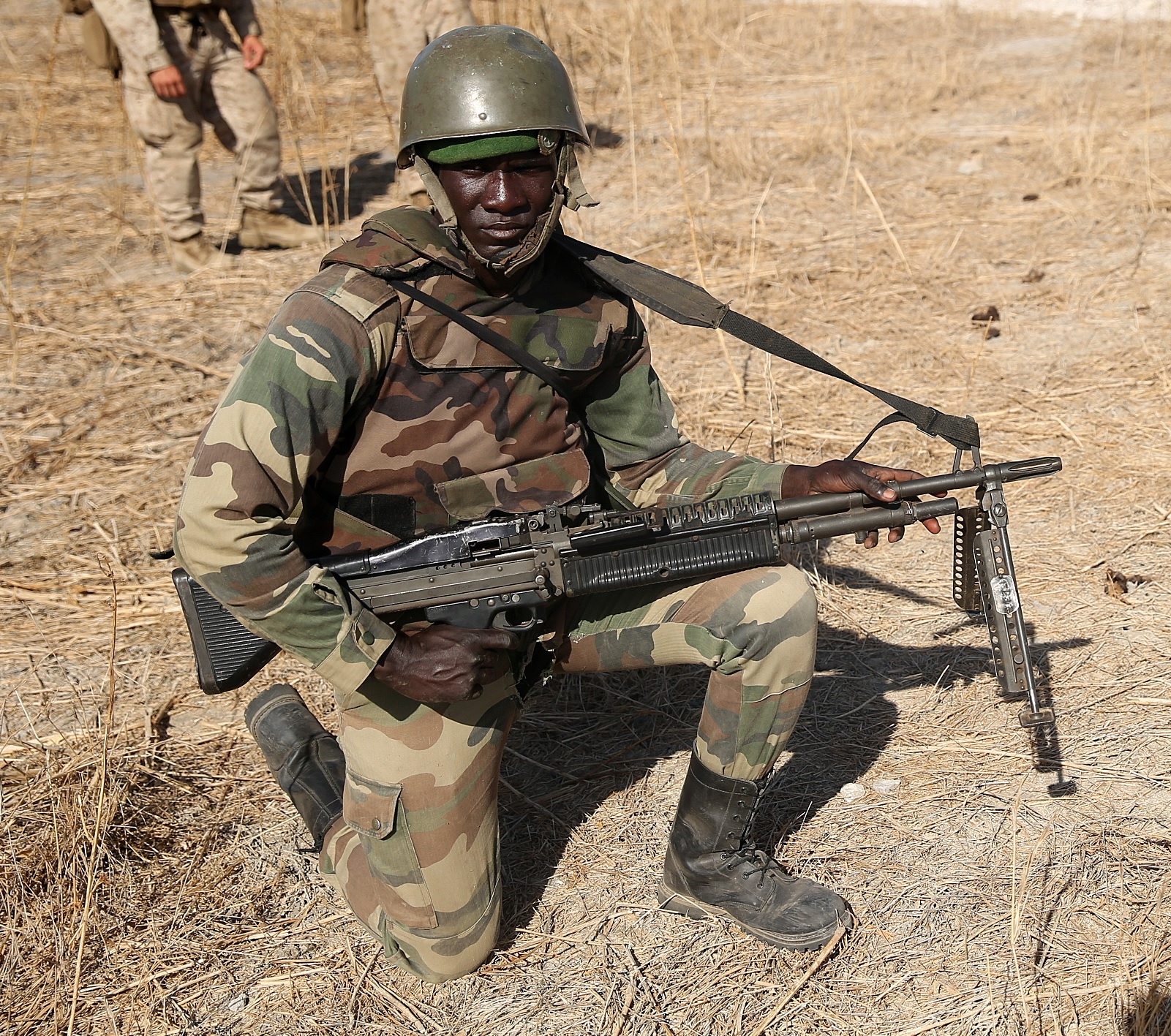
Senegalese Marine with an M60 in 2016.

- Algeria
- Australia: Replaced by the FN Minimi (light roles) and FN MAG58 (general-purpose roles).
- Bolivia
- Bosnia and Herzegovina
- Brazil
- Cambodia
- Chile
- Colombia
- Costa Rica
- Czech Republic: The M60E4 is used in small numbers by specialized units of the Czech Army. Known to be in use by the 601st Special Forces Group in 2006 to replace the UK-59L.
- Democratic Republic of the Congo
- Denmark: Starting 2015, the Danish Army will receive 600+ M60E6s.
- Dominican Republic
- East Timor: M60E6
- El Salvador
- Egypt
- Fiji
- Ghana
- Greece
- Haiti
- Honduras
- Italy
- Indonesia: M60, M60E2 used by the army; M60C by the air force; M60E6 by the navy.
- Jordan
- Kuwait
- Lebanon
- Liberia
- Lithuania: Received a grant of 75 M60s in 2002 from the US Defense Logistics Agency.
- Luxembourg: In service 1957–1972; replaced by FN MAG.
- Malaysia: M60E1 is used by the Malaysian Army Grup Gerak Khas.
- Mexico
- Morocco
- Nicaragua
- Panama
- Papua New Guinea
- Peru
- Philippines
- Portugal: Portuguese Army uses M60E and D mounted on V-150 Commando.
- Saint Vincent and the Grenadines
- Senegal: Received a grant of 2,500 M60s in 2002 from the US's Defense Logistics Agency.
- South Korea: Produced under license since 1974.
- Spain
- Sudan
- Taiwan: Produced locally as the T57 machine gun (57式機槍).
- Thailand
- Trinidad and Tobago
- Tunisia: M60E4 used by Unité Spéciale – Garde Nationale.
- Turkey: Used by Underwater Offence and Police Special Operations Department.
- Uganda
- Ukraine
- United Kingdom: Used by the Royal Air Force; mounted on the Chinook.
- United States: Used by the U.S. Army, the U.S. Navy SEALs, the Los Angeles Police Department and the Los Angeles Sheriff's Department.
- Venezuela
- Vietnam: Used by the PAVN and former ARVN.

=== Non-state operators ===
- Amal Movement
- Army of Free Lebanon (AFL)
- Bougainville Revolutionary Army (BRA)
- Lebanese Arab Army (LAA)
- Lebanese Forces
- Revolutionary Armed Forces of Colombia (FARC)
- Moro Islamic Liberation Front (MILF)
- Nicaraguan Contras
- Progressive Socialist Party/People's Liberation Army (PLA) of Lebanon
- Provisional Irish Republican Army
- Lord's Resistance Army
- Hezbollah

== In popular culture ==
- The M60 was depicted in the American war action films First Blood and M60E3 in Rambo: First Blood Part II.
- The M60 appeared in the 1986 movie Maximum Overdrive where it was installed on an M274 Mule
- The M60 appeared in the American crime drama show Breaking Bad. It was first revealed in its season 5 premiere "Live Free or Die" and later used in the show's finale "Felina", attached to the trunk of a car and remotely activated. The use of the gun as depicted in Breaking Bad was tested in the science entertainment show MythBusters, determined as plausible.
- An M60E3 with a shortened barrel appears in the 1985 movie Commando, with Arnold Schwarzenegger.
- The M60 also appears in the 1987 movie Full Metal Jacket, most notably used by the character Animal Mother.

== See also ==
=== In general ===
- List of machine guns

=== Comparable weapons ===
- PK machine gun – (Soviet Union), Warsaw Pact counterpart of the M60
- PKP Pecheneg machine gun – (Russia)
- FN MAG – (Belgium)
- FN Maximi – (Belgium)
- IWI Negev – (Israel)
- Mk 48 machine gun – (Belgium, United States)
- Sumitomo Type 62 – (Japan)
- TKB-015A , Soviet prototype similar to the M60
- Type 67 machine gun – (China)
- UKM-2000 – (Poland)

== Other references ==
- Field Manual No. 3-22.68: Crew-Served Machine Guns (PDF). Department of the Army. January 31, 2003. Archived from the original (PDF) on October 23, 2023.
- "U.S. Army TACOM — Rock Island". U.S. Army TACOM. Archived from the original on May 9, 2004.
- MCWP 3–15.1: Machine Guns and Machine Gun Gunnery (PDF). United States Marine Corps.
- "Navy SEALs: Weapons - M60". Navy SEALs. Archived from the original on October 24, 2005.
- "MK43 MOD 0". U.S. Ordnance. Archived from the original on January 1, 2011.
- "Imagenes de UNOPES, GEO, FES, BFP y marinos de la armada de México". Taringa!.
