= U.S. Ordnance =

American firearms manufacturer for militaries

U.S. Ordnance, Inc.
- Type: Private
- Industry: Arms
- Founded: 1997
- Headquarters: Reno, Nevada, United States
- Products: Firearms
- Website: www.usord.com

U.S. Ordnance–Defense Systems and Manufacturing, often called USORD, is a firearms manufacturer in McCarran, Nevada, 20 minutes outside Reno. Since 1997, the Nevada corporation has designed, developed, and manufactured military small arms, machine guns, and replacement parts.

U.S. Ordnance specializes in producing versions of the mature, combat-proven Mk43/M60E4 and M2 machine guns, making and testing them according to U.S. military technical specifications and instructions. U.S. Ordnance is the only manufacturer of the Mk43 machine gun.

The company's primary weapons are the M2HB, M2A2 (QCB), the Mk43/M60E4, the M60D Enhanced and the M16/M4/M203, all of which are sanctioned by NATO. U.S. Ordnance sells these to U.S. government agencies, including law enforcement and the military, and to federally approved foreign governments and militaries. It also provides training for its products.

M2 and M60 machine guns are in service in more than 47 countries.

== Capabilities ==
U.S. Ordnance's new plant is a 68,000-square-foot (6,300 m^{2}) facility for product research, development, manufacturing and testing. A U.S. government representative is on site to witness and verify specific procedures in the production and testing of the weapons, and ensure all the required standards are met.

== Development ==
All the products that U.S. Ordnance develops are to NATO specifications.

The company ensures that all of its Mk43 and M2 improvements are backwards-compatible and that its M2 spares and components interchange with those from Maremont Corp. and Saco Defense.

U.S. Ordnance Research and Development personnel put the company's weapons through drop testing and environmental testing like mud, ice, heat and water immersion to ensure they will continue to perform even in the harshest environments.

== Manufacturing ==
U.S. Ordnance has CNC machining centers and screw machines, which are used to machine the various parts that make up each weapon. Other machinery includes high-capacity barrel production and Mil Standard plating equipment.

The company also uses a magnetic particle inspection machine for detecting surface and subsurface irregularities in the metal of its weapons.

In February 2006, much of the M60 production tooling (owned by the U.S. Army) was transferred from General Dynamics at Saco to U.S. Ordnance.

=== Inventory control and storage ===
U.S. Ordnance's ISO 9001:2008 inventory control and storage process guarantees that only approved components and materials are used on its weapons.

=== Surface treatments ===
Finished components are phosphated in-house using a U.S. government-certified Mil-Spec process. It involves application of manganese, which protects the steel surfaces from corrosion.

=== Cryogenic processing ===
U.S. Ordnance also puts its weapons through a cold treatment. Called cryo for short, the process involves cooling the steel to about minus 300 degrees Fahrenheit, which increases the martensite content in its crystalline structure. This hardens and strengthens the metal.

U.S. Ordnance uses cryo to relieve stresses in tooling and weapon materials, to increase the weapons' service life, and to help resist wear.

=== Final assembly ===
U.S. Ordnance workers assemble and complete all of the company's weapons in-house. All U.S. Ordnance packaging conforms to the military preservation, packing, and marking requirements of the current Mil Standard. UID and RFID marking are done as required.

=== Shooting/testing ===
Each weapon undergoes high-pressure testing and magnetic particle inspection. The company has an on-site shooting range, where personnel proof-fire every weapon for functionality and accuracy.

=== Quality control/assurance ===
The quality assurance team checks all materials and parts. They inspect the material certifications, heat treat and test reports, and also perform dimensional testing on all of the parts to ensure they comply with the technical drawings.

Each weapon has a unique serial number, which means that all of the raw materials that went into making each one can be traced to their origins.

=== Packaging ===
Once a weapon is completed, tested, and approved by Quality Assurance, it is packaged, labeled, and marked according to the current Mil Standard.

== Government contracts ==
Some of the government contracts U.S. Ordnance has fulfilled include:

- Under contract, U.S. Ordnance supplied 15 M60E3 machine guns along with 15 spare barrels to the Philippines in June 2005 as an FMS sale.
- U.S. Ordnance fulfilled a purchase order from the U.S. Army in September 2007 for 173 M60D Enhanced machine guns along with spare parts. Provided as aid to the Philippines, they were delivered in 2008.
- Between November 2004 and May 2009, U.S. Ordnance fulfilled the following orders for foreign allies: 3,196 M60E4/MK 43 machine guns, 2,337 spare barrels, 341 conversion kits and 367 accessory kits.
- In September 2008, U.S. Ordnance received a contract from the U.S. Army for M2HB (859) M2HB machine guns, (859) spare barrels and (859) basic accessory kits. It fulfilled this FMS contract, whose end user was the Afghan National Army.
- In April 2009, U.S. Ordnance received a 5-year, indefinite-quantity contract from the U.S. Army for M60E4/Mk43 machine guns to support foreign military sales. The first three orders under this contract totaled 2,217 M60E4s, 1853 spare long barrels and 309 conversion kits, plus parts and accessories.The contract number is W52H0909D0135 and FMS customers can now order from this contract until 2014.
- On June 9, 2010 TACOM-RI contracted (50) each M60D Enhanced Machine Guns
- In July 2009, U.S. Ordnance was awarded a one-time, 20 percent, small business set-aside, indefinite-delivery/indefinite-quantity (IDIQ) type contract with four ordering periods, under which orders will be placed for the M2 .50 caliber Flex machine gun, NSN: 1005-00-322-9715, Part Number: 8401485. The contract number is W52H0909D0249 and delivery order 0001 obligates the one-time, 20 percent small business set-aside guaranteed minimum quantity of (548) M2 machine guns. The grand total maximum ordering quantity over the four ordering periods against all awarded contracts is 40,000 each. Contract Expiration Date is August 31, 2012.
- In August 2009, U.S. Ordnance received a 4-year, indefinite-quantity contract from the U.S. Army for M2HB, M2A2 (QCB) and M48 machine guns to support foreign military sales. There have been four delivery orders under this contract totaling (475) M2HBs, (475) spare barrels and (475) basic accessories, (252) M2A2 quick change barrels, (80) M48 weapon systems, plus parts and OCONUS training. The end users were the Colombian Army, Colombian Navy, and the Iraq National Police. The contract number is W52H0909D0270, and FMS customers can now order from this contract until August 2012.

== Weapons ==
=== Heavy Machine Guns ===
- M2HB: .50 Cal, (12.7mm NATO) U.S. Ordnance is under a multi-year contract to supply M2HB machine guns to the U.S. military
- M2A2 (QCB): .50 Cal, (12.7mm NATO) U.S. Ordnance's M2A2 offers the proven performance of the existing M2HB machine gun but also features fixed headspace and timing.
- M48: The U.S. Ordnance M48 Fixed (Turret Type) is a link belt-fed, recoil-operated, air-cooled, crew-served machine gun. U.S. Ordnance is under a multi-year contract to supply M48 machine guns to the U.S. military.
- M2A2 Conversion Kit: This kit converts M2HB weapons into U.S. Ordnance M2A2 (QCB) systems. It can be done by an armorer at the customer location in less than 30 minutes per weapon, without complex tools or machinery.
- M3 Tripod

=== Medium Machine Guns ===
- M60D Enhanced: (7.62 NATO) The M60D Enhanced is a mounted version of the standard M60E4/Mk43. It can be mounted on boats and vehicles, or as a pintle-mounted door gun in helicopters.
- Mk43 Mod 0: (7.62mm NATO) The Mk43 General Purpose Machine Gun (GPMG) features the latest improvements to the M60 Series machine guns.
- Mk43 Conversion Kit: The U.S. Ordnance M60E4/Mk43 Conversion Kit upgrades any serviceable M60 receiver to the M60E4/Mk43 configuration. Upgrades can be performed at U.S. Ordnance or the customer facility after training by U.S. Ordnance staff.
- M240
