= Recall of MPs Act 2015 =

United Kingdom constitutional legislation

Recall of MPs Act 2015 (Note: Section 25.)
- Act of Parliament
- Parliament of the United Kingdom
- Long title: An Act to make provision about the recall of members of the House of Commons; and for connected purposes.
- Citation: 2015 c. 25
- Introduced by: Nick Clegg MP, Deputy Prime Minister of the United Kingdom (Commons); Lord Wallace of Saltaire (Lords)
- Territorial extent: England and Wales; Scotland; Ireland; (Note: Section 23.)

Dates
- Royal assent: 26 March 2015
- Commencement: Various (Note: Section 24.)
Other legislation
Amends	Representation of the People Act 1983; Political Parties, Elections and Referendums Act 2000; Electoral Administration Act 2006
Amended by	Recall of MPs Act 2015 (Recall Petition) Regulations 2016; Transfer of Functions (Elections, Referendums, Third Sector and Information) Order 2016; European Parliamentary Elections Etc. (Repeal, Revocation, Amendment and Saving Provisions) (United Kingdom and Gibraltar) (EU Exit) Regulations 2018; Coronavirus Act 2020; Dissolution and Calling of Parliament Act 2022; Elections Act 2022; Criminal Justice Act 2003 (Commencement No. 33) and Sentencing Act 2020 (Commencement No. 2) Regulations 2022; Judicial Review and Courts Act 2022 (Magistrates’ Court Sentencing Powers) Regulations 2023

Status: Amended

History of passage through Parliament

Text of statute as originally enacted

Revised text of statute as amended

The Recall of MPs Act 2015 (c. 25) is an act of the Parliament of the United Kingdom that makes provision for constituents to recall their member of Parliament (MP) and trigger a by-election. It received royal assent on 26 March 2015 after being introduced on 11 September 2014.

Unlike recall procedures in some other countries, the act does not allow constituents to initiate the process. Proceedings, which are not discretionary, are initiated by the Speaker (or Deputy Speaker) of the House, and occur only if an MP is found guilty of wrongdoing fulfilling certain criteria. A petition is successful if at least one in ten voters in the constituency sign. Successful petitions result in the MP vacating the seat, triggering a by-election.

== Background ==
Before the passage of the act there were no mechanisms to recall members of Parliament (MPs) in the UK. The Representation of the People Act 1981 disqualifies any person serving a jail sentence for more than a year from being an MP, and thus automatically ejects an MP so jailed. MPs involved in scandals or convicted of lesser crimes could be expelled from their party and pressured to resign, but there was no mechanism to force the exit of an MP prior to a general election.

Supporters for introducing recall mechanisms included the pressure group 38 Degrees and the National Union of Students.

In 2009, a proposed Lords amendment to the Political Parties and Elections Act 2009 would have made the Electoral Commission carry out a review into developing a recall mechanism; the amendment was defeated. A Ten Minute Rule bill was introduced by Douglas Carswell later that year with the aim of introducing both recall and primary elections for candidates; it did not progress. The UK government gave a commitment in the 2010 Coalition Agreement to bring into force a power of recall. Following the election and the coalition government's commitment, Zac Goldsmith introduced a series of private members bills for a recall process, none of which were successful.

In the aftermath of the 2009 expenses scandal, a number of MPs involved in wrongdoing resigned following related court cases—for example Eric Illsley, whose resignation caused the 2011 Barnsley Central by-election, and Denis MacShane, who caused the 2012 Rotherham by-election. Such cases were cited by supporters of recall to allow voters to "sack" MPs who break the rules.

In June 2012, the Political and Constitutional Reform Select Committee published its reports into the recall process, listing twenty conclusions and recommendations which included the views that "a system of full recall may deter MPs from taking decisions that are unpopular locally or unpopular in the short-term, but which are in the long-term national interest", "[w]e note that expulsion would not prevent the person concerned standing in the resulting by-election. We recommend that the Government abandon its plans to introduce a power of recall", and "We have not seen enough evidence to support the suggestion that it will increase public confidence in politics, and fear that the restricted form of recall proposed could even reduce confidence by creating expectations that are not fulfilled."

In October 2014, during the final stage of debate on the bill in the Commons, opponents of the recall process pressed for assurances that voters could not begin recall petitions on the basis of views held or speeches made. Labour MP Geraint Davies said that misuse of the process would be an "intrinsic corruption of our democracy". Labour MP Frank Dobson opposed recall as a threat to "hinder social progress" by "vested interests".

Opponents of the process further worried that MPs "in fear" of being recalled would increase the number of "automatons and lobby fodder" in the Commons.

== Details ==
Section 1 sets out the circumstances in which the Speaker of the House of Commons – or, in certain cases, their deputies – would trigger the recall process:

- Any custodial (prison) sentence, even if suspended. (A sentence longer than one year would lead to automatic removal under the Representation of the People Act 1981.)
- A conviction for providing false or misleading expenses claims.
- Suspension from the House of at least 10 sitting days or 14 calendar days, following a report by "any committee of the House of Commons concerned with the standards of conduct of individual members of that House" (typically the Commons Select Committee on Standards). The Independent Expert Panel (IEP) established in 2020 took on some of the previous role of the Select Committee on Standards, but as it is not a committee of the House, its recommendations originally could not trigger recall. This was addressed by an October 2021 amendment to Commons standing orders requiring the Select Committee on Standards to recommend suspension if asked to do so by the IEP.

Sections 7–11 outline the procedure whereby the petition is forwarded by the electoral returning officer for the constituency to the MP's constituents for ratification, approval by 10 per cent of the registered electors triggering the loss of the MP's seat and a by-election.

Section 15 confirms that the seat becomes vacant if the petition is successful, if it has not already been vacated by disqualification or death, or otherwise.

Sections 16–22 make further provisions, including prohibiting forecasts of the outcome of active recall petitions which are based on statements from or surveys of potential signatories.

== Recall procedure ==
If an MP has been convicted of a criminal offence which would make them eligible for recall, they are not subject to recall until all of their appeals have been exhausted. In such a case, the courts are obliged to inform the Speaker of any progress made during the appeal.

Once one of the conditions outlined in the act is fulfilled, the Speaker informs the petitions officer of the constituency; in most cases this would be the returning officer or acting returning officer. The petitions officer is then required to make the practical arrangements for the petition so as to open the proceedings within ten working days after the Speaker's notification. This involves selecting up to ten signing locations where petitioners can sign in person, in a similar manner to election polling stations. As with votes in elections, voters are able to sign via post or proxy. Campaigning for or against recalling the MP is regulated by spending restrictions.

The petition remains open for six weeks. No ongoing tally is reported by the petitions officer, and it is not revealed whether the required threshold of 10 per cent of eligible registered voters has been reached until the close of the petition period. During the petition period the MP remains in office. If the petition is successful the seat becomes vacant and by-election procedures begin. The recalled MP is permitted to stand in the by-election.

If the MP vacates the seat, or Parliament is dissolved (for a general election), the recall is halted and the petition ends.

The Electoral Commission reviewed the processes involved in the unsuccessful 2018 recall petition, as well as in the two successful recalls in 2019. They found that the three petitions had been carried out effectively and there were no significant problems or indications of fraud, but they identified a number of practical challenges linked to the availability of signing places, the length of the recall period, and the transparency of the process.

== List of recall petitions ==
Parliament	Petition and by-election	MP	Cause	Outcome	
Parliament	Petition and by-election	MP	Cause	% signing petition	MP elected in by-election
2017–2019	North Antrim, 2018	Ian Paisley Jr (independent, suspended from DUP during petition)	30-day suspension from the House	9.4%	Petition unsuccessful
2017–2019	Peterborough, 2019	Fiona Onasanya (independent, elected as Labour)	Custodial sentence of three months	27.6%	Lisa Forbes (Labour)
2017–2019	Brecon and Radnorshire, 2019	Christopher Davies (Conservative)	Conviction for providing false or misleading expenses claims	18.9%	Jane Dodds (Liberal Democrats)
2019–2024	Rutherglen and Hamilton West, 2023	Margaret Ferrier (independent, elected as SNP)	30-day suspension from the House	14.7%	Michael Shanks (Labour)
2019–2024	Wellingborough, 2023	Peter Bone (independent, elected as Conservative)	6-week suspension from the House	13.2%	Gen Kitchen (Labour)
2019–2024	Blackpool South, 2024	Scott Benton (independent, elected as Conservative)	35-day suspension from the House	Petition terminated due to resignation of MP	
2024–present	No recall petitions have yet taken place				

== Potential petitions not held ==
In addition to the recall petitions that were initiated, there have been several occasions where an MP was found to have committed serious misconduct or a criminal act, but the recall process was not initiated due to subsequent events or for other reasons.

=== Left parliament before petition ===
- In October 2019, the Committee for Standards recommended that Keith Vaz (Leicester East) be suspended from Parliament for six months after finding that he had offered to buy illegal drugs for sex workers. As Parliament had voted to dissolve itself for the general election six weeks later, the recall process was delayed until after the election; Vaz declined to defend his seat and instead retired from Parliament.
- In November 2021, Owen Paterson (North Shropshire) had been found by the Parliamentary Commissioner for Standards to have breached lobbying rules, but the House of Commons voted to reject a proposed 30-day suspension in November 2021 after the government whipped its MPs to vote against the committee's report. The Government subsequently made a U-turn and proposed a new vote, but Paterson chose to resign from Parliament, pre-empting the vote and triggering a by-election.
- In October 2022, Chris Matheson (City of Chester) was found to have committed sexual misconduct, and the IEP recommended a suspension of 14 days; he resigned from Parliament on the day the report was published, triggering a by-election without a recall petition.
- In June 2023, former Prime Minister Boris Johnson (Uxbridge and South Ruislip) was found by the Committee of Privileges to have deliberately misled Parliament about parties at 10 Downing Street during COVID-19 lockdowns. Initially, the committee planned to propose a suspension of twenty days (triggering a recall petition), but after Johnson made public statements that impugned the committee after being given its report before publication, he was additionally found to be in contempt of Parliament. Johnson resigned as MP before the committee reported, requiring a by-election; the committee said that if he had still been an MP a 90-day suspension would have been recommended.
- In September 2023, Chris Pincher (Tamworth) resigned his seat after the Standards Committee recommended an 8-week suspension and he lost his appeal over this recommendation. The suspension was proposed after he drunkenly groped two men.
- In March 2025, a petition was expected in Runcorn and Helsby following the sentencing of former Labour MP Mike Amesbury on 24 February 2025 to 10 weeks of imprisonment, which on appeal was suspended for two years. However the petition did not take place following Amesbury's announcement that he intended to resign, which triggered a by-election.

=== Other petitions not initiated ===
- In May 2021, Rob Roberts (Delyn) was suspended from the House for six weeks for sexual misconduct, but this did not require a recall petition as his case had been judged by the Independent Expert Panel (IEP) instead of a Commons committee. Parliament closed this loophole in October 2021, with the Committee in future required to recommend suspensions when requested to do so by the IEP, but a vote on applying this revision retrospectively to Roberts failed.
- In October 2021, Claudia Webbe (Leicester East) was convicted of harassment and initially sentenced to ten weeks' imprisonment, suspended. However, on appeal her sentence was reduced to a non-custodial one, so no petition was triggered.
