= 2019 Peterborough by-election =

2019 UK parliament by-election

- 6 June 2019

Peterborough constituency
- Turnout: 48.43%
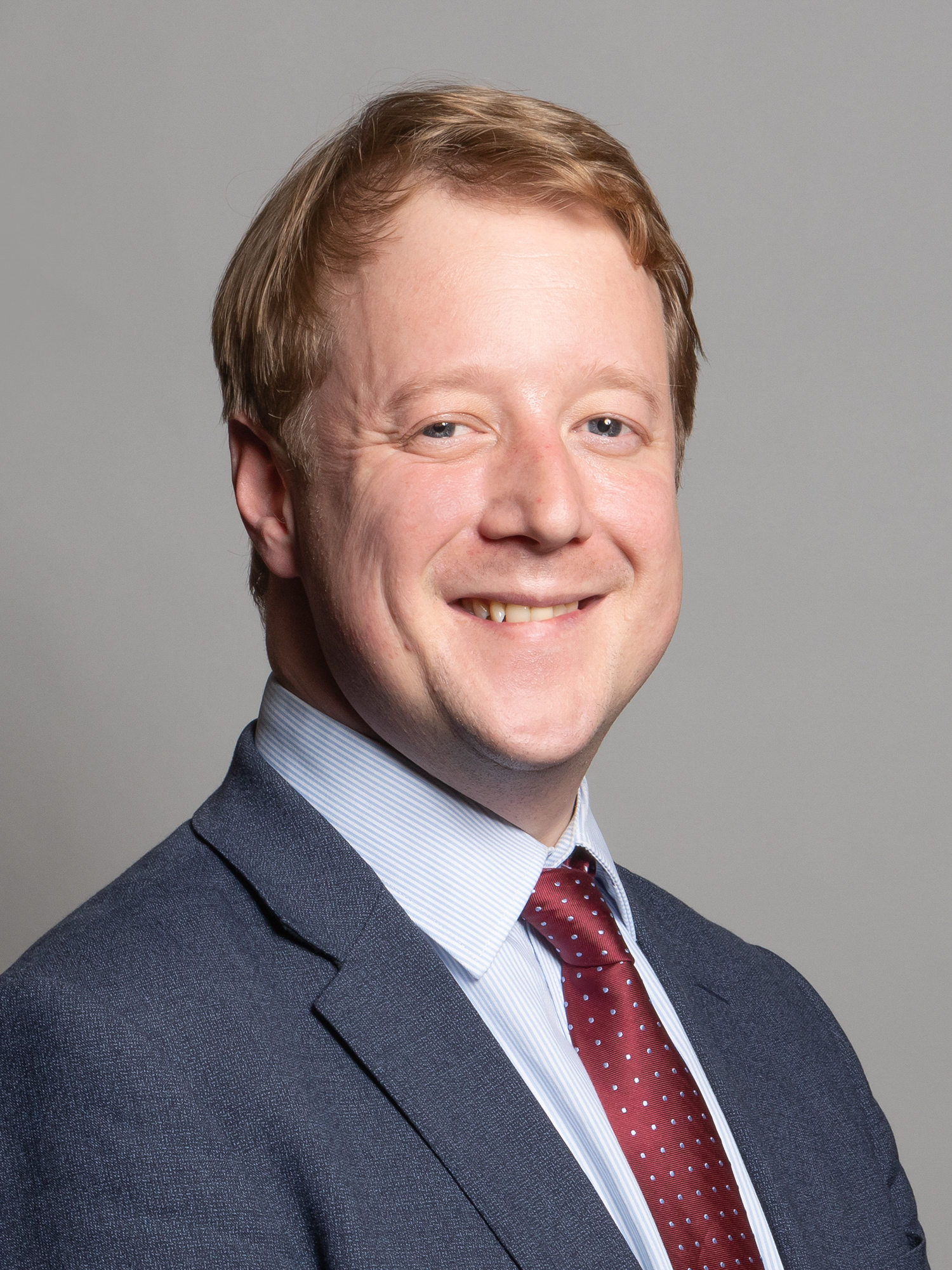
| | First party | Second party |
|---|---|---|
| Candidate | Lisa Forbes | Mike Greene |
| Party | Labour | Brexit Party |
| Last election | 48.1% | New party |
| Popular vote | 10,484 | 9,801 |
| Percentage | 30.9% | 28.9% |
| Swing | ▼17.2 pp | New party |
| | Third party | Fourth party |
| Candidate | Paul Bristow | Beki Sellick |
| Party | Conservative | Liberal Democrats |
| Last election | 46.8% | 3.3% |
| Popular vote | 7,243 | 4,159 |
| Percentage | 21.4% | 12.3% |
| Swing | ▼25.5 pp | ▲8.9 pp |
MP before election
Fiona Onasanya
Independent
Elected MP
Lisa Forbes
Labour

A by-election for the United Kingdom parliamentary constituency of Peterborough was held on 6 June 2019. It was triggered by incumbent Labour Party MP Fiona Onasanya being removed from office via a recall petition, following her conviction of perverting the course of justice in relation to a speeding offence. Lisa Forbes, also of Labour, won the by-election with a reduced majority, narrowly holding-off the Brexit Party's Mike Greene.

== Background ==
Labour candidate Fiona Onasanya was elected as a Labour MP to represent Peterborough at the 2017 general election, defeating Stewart Jackson, the sitting Conservative MP, by 607 votes.

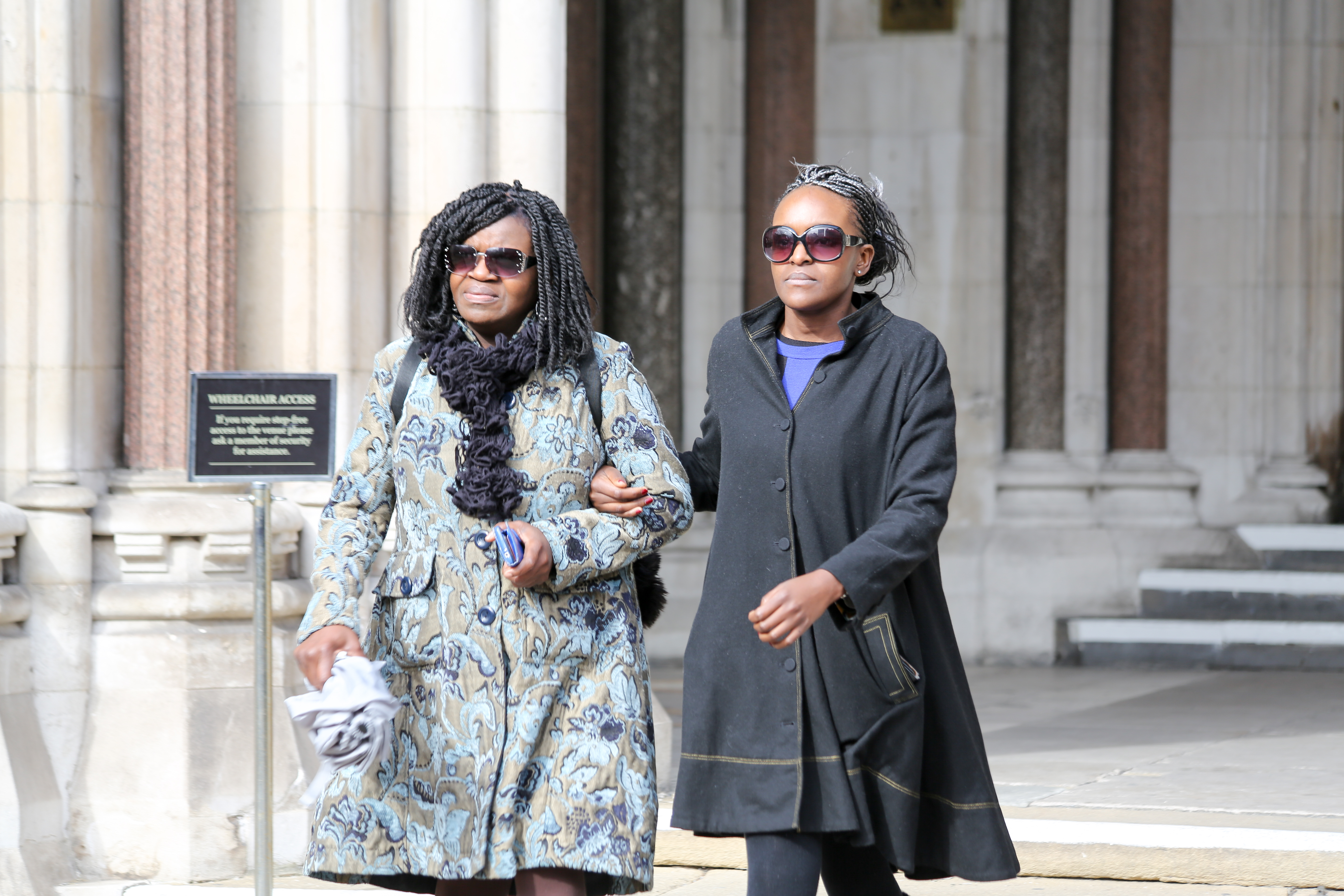
Fiona Onasanya (right) leaving the Royal Courts of Justice after her appeal was rejected.

In July 2017, her car was driven at 41 mph (66 km/h) through a 30 mph (48 km/h) zone in Thorney, Cambridgeshire. A Notice of Intended Prosecution was returned to the police in her name, claiming that a man named Aleks Antipow was the driver. However, it was later discovered that Antipow was in his native Russia at the time. Around the same time, her brother Festus had also responded to two other notices with false names. Both Fiona and Festus Onasanya were consequently charged with perverting the course of justice; Festus pleaded guilty while Fiona pleaded not guilty.

Owing to the jury at the Old Bailey failing to reach a verdict, Judge Nicholas Hilliard QC ordered a retrial. At the retrial, Onasanya was found guilty and compared herself afterwards to several biblical figures including Moses and Jesus who had been convicted by courts in their day; she declared her intention to appeal. Onasanya received a three-month prison sentence. The Attorney General reviewed the sentence after a complaint was received from the public that it was unduly lenient, and concluded that it was not. Onasanya was released from prison on 26 February 2019, after serving four weeks. Following the conviction for perverting the course of justice, Onasanya was expelled from the Labour Party in January 2019. She remained in Parliament, where she sat as an independent, and continued to protest her innocence. Her appeal against conviction was rejected on 5 March 2019.

=== Recall petition ===
==== Procedure and timetable ====
Under the Recall of MPs Act 2015, any MP who receives a prison sentence of a year or less is subject to a recall petition, though the procedure cannot begin until appeals have been unsuccessful. Onasanya lost her request to appeal on 5 March 2019. The court officially informed the Speaker of the House of Commons who, later that day, took the necessary steps to initiate the process which included notifying the petition officer for the constituency.

The petition officer for Peterborough opened the petition on 19 March, with ten designated signing places within the constituency for constituents to sign the petition. The threshold for success was 10% of eligible constituents (6,967 out of 69,673) signing within the six-week period (ending 1 May (Note: The polling places were closed on Good Friday and Easter Monday, hence the extra two days of being open.)) in order to recall Onasanya and call a by-election. Registered parliamentary electors could sign the petition at their assigned polling place, or do so by post or by proxy. The projected cost of the petition was approximately £500,000.

No ongoing tally was reported by the petitions officer, thus it was not known that the required threshold had been reached until the end of the six-week period. There was no opinion polling, as UK law prohibits forecasts of the outcome of recall petitions which are based on statements from, or surveys of, potential signatories.

==== Result ====
19,261 signatures were obtained. This represented 27.64% of the 69,673 electors eligible to sign the petition, thus surpassing the 10% threshold, causing the seat to become vacant, and triggering the 2019 Peterborough by-election. The Electoral Commission later revealed that the threshold had been reached in the first two days. This was the second recall petition since the Recall of MPs Act 2015, and the first successful use of the procedure to remove a sitting MP.

Though she did not stand, Onasanya was legally eligible to be a candidate in the by-election. The Labour Party had withdrawn support for her – the party encouraged voters to sign the petition and, along with several other parties, pre-selected a by-election candidate.

== Candidates and campaign ==
The list of 15 nominated candidates was announced on 9 May. Anticipating the recall petition's success, several parties announced candidates before it had even opened.

Although not disqualified from seeking to regain her seat, Onasanya did not fight the by-election. Former Labour and Respect Party MP George Galloway announced his intention to stand on a pro-Brexit position and sought the Brexit Party candidacy, but was not selected. Although Galloway had mooted standing as an independent, he did not do so.

The Liberal Democrat campaign focused on opposition to Brexit and calling for a second referendum. Change UK, the Liberal Democrats, the Green Party and Renew were close to supporting a joint Remain candidate, Femi Oluwole of Our Future Our Choice, but they ultimately opted to stand their own candidates, except for Change UK. Change UK's Gavin Shuker said the plan was stymied by Labour, who he said made clear that Labour would "strenuously" disrupt a joint Remain campaign. Change UK reportedly blamed Labour-aligned figures in the People's Vote campaign. Oluwole denied being pressured by Labour sources, but said he was concerned about splitting the Labour vote and allowing the Brexit Party to win. Beki Sellick, who had previously stood for the seat in the 2017 General Election, was announced as the Liberal Democrat candidate and Joseph Wells as the Green Party candidate.

Four days before the election, Labour was urged by Jewish leaders to disown its candidate Lisa Forbes after she was reported as endorsing a Facebook post that contained an antisemitic phrase.

Brexit Party candidate Mike Greene was criticised for profiteering from freehold properties and his involvement with Greybull Capital, a private investment group involved in the May 2019 collapse of British Steel. A spokesman for Greene stated that he was never an active participant in running the investment vehicle. When polls closed, the Brexit Party had been heavily favoured in bookmakers' odds to win, with Labour generally thought to be in second place.

== Result ==
Bar chart of the election result

2019 by-election: Peterborough
| Party | Candidate | Votes | % | ±% |
|---|---|---|---|---|
| Labour | Lisa Forbes | 10,484 | 30.91 | −17.16 |
| Brexit Party | Mike Greene | 9,801 | 28.89 | New |
| Conservative | Paul Bristow | 7,243 | 21.35 | −25.45 |
| Liberal Democrats | Beki Sellick | 4,159 | 12.26 | +8.92 |
| Green | Joseph Wells | 1,035 | 3.05 | +1.27 |
| UKIP | John Whitby | 400 | 1.18 | New |
| CPA | Tom Rogers | 162 | 0.49 | New |
| English Democrat | Stephen Goldspink | 153 | 0.45 | New |
| SDP | Patrick O'Flynn | 135 | 0.40 | New |
| Monster Raving Loony | Alan "Howling Laud" Hope | 112 | 0.33 | New |
| No description | Andrew Moore | 101 | 0.30 | New |
| Common Good | Dick Rodgers | 60 | 0.18 | New |
| Renew | Peter Ward | 45 | 0.13 | New |
| UKEU | Pierre Kirk | 25 | 0.07 | New |
| No description | Bobby Smith | 5 | 0.01 | New |
| Majority | | 683 | 2.02 | +0.7 |
| Turnout | | 33,920 | 48.43 | −19.07 |
| Labour hold | | | | |

The winner's percentage of the total vote (30.9%) was the lowest at a by-election since the 1946 Combined English Universities by-election (30.0%). However, there have been twelve lower winning shares in general elections.

== Reaction and aftermath ==
Labour leader Jeremy Corbyn welcomed the result as an endorsement of his party's stance: "This result shows that in spite of the divisions and deadlock over Brexit, when it comes to a vote on the issues that directly affect people’s lives, Labour’s case for real change has strong support across the country".

Despite the loss, Brexit Party candidate Mike Greene characterised the result as a significant breakthrough for his party, claiming to have "shaken up British politics". Party leader Nigel Farage attended the count but left before the result was announced.

After the Brexit Party questioned the validity of the result, five electoral fraud allegations were investigated. It was claimed that Tariq Mahmood, who was jailed in 2008 for postal vote interference, had played a role in the Labour Party campaign for the by-election. Labour denied he had had any role in the campaign, although he did attend the count as a member of the public. The Brexit Party announced on 24 June 2019 that they would be lodging a review petition under the Representation of the People Act 1983. On 15 July, Cambridgeshire Constabulary announced the final conclusion of their investigations and determined that no offences had been committed. In 2020, Brexit Party candidate Mike Greene was ordered to pay the Labour Party's legal costs after dropping a High Court challenge.

On 21 September, the Peterborough Telegraph reported that the Green Party had submitted incorrect election expenses, having failed to declare the £15 cost of a visit by former party leader Natalie Bennett. The party stated that, having been aware of the cost, they would add the sum retrospectively to the expenses.

Ultimately, Lisa Forbes' hold on the seat lasted for just six months. When a general election was held was held in December 2019, Paul Bristow captured the seat for the Conservatives with a majority of over 2,500 votes.

== Previous result ==
2017 general election: Peterborough
| Party | Candidate | Votes | % | ±% |
|---|---|---|---|---|
| Labour | Fiona Onasanya | 22,950 | 48.1 | +12.5 |
| Conservative | Stewart Jackson | 22,343 | 46.8 | +7.1 |
| Liberal Democrats | Beki Sellick | 1,597 | 3.3 | −0.4 |
| Green | Fiona Radić | 848 | 1.8 | −0.8 |
| Majority | | 607 | 1.3 | N/A |
| Turnout | | 47,738 | 67.5 | +2.6 |
| Labour gain from Conservative | | Swing | +2.7 | |

== See also ==
- Other recall petitions:
  - 2018 North Antrim recall petition
  - 2019 Brecon and Radnorshire recall petition
  - 2023 Rutherglen and Hamilton West recall petition
