= Centon =

Centon may refer to:

- Centon (Battlestar Galactica), a fictional unit of time from the 1978 Battlestar Galactica American television series
- Centon (photographic brand), an own-brand range of photographic equipment sold by the UK retailer Jessops
