= Moss Bros Group =

British clothing company

Moss
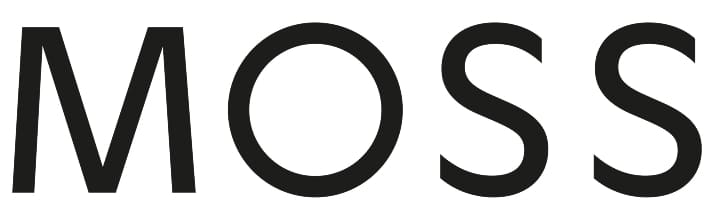
- Type: Private Company (Ltd)
- Genre: Clothing retail
- Founded: 1851; 175 years ago
- Founder: Moses Moss
- Headquarters: London, United Kingdom
- Number of locations: 113
- Key people: Debbie Hewitt (Chairman); Brian Brick (Chief Executive); Tony Bennett (Finance Director & Company Secretary)
- Revenue: £130.2 million
- Operating income: -1.8 million
- Net income: -1.4 million
- Website: https://www.moss.co.uk

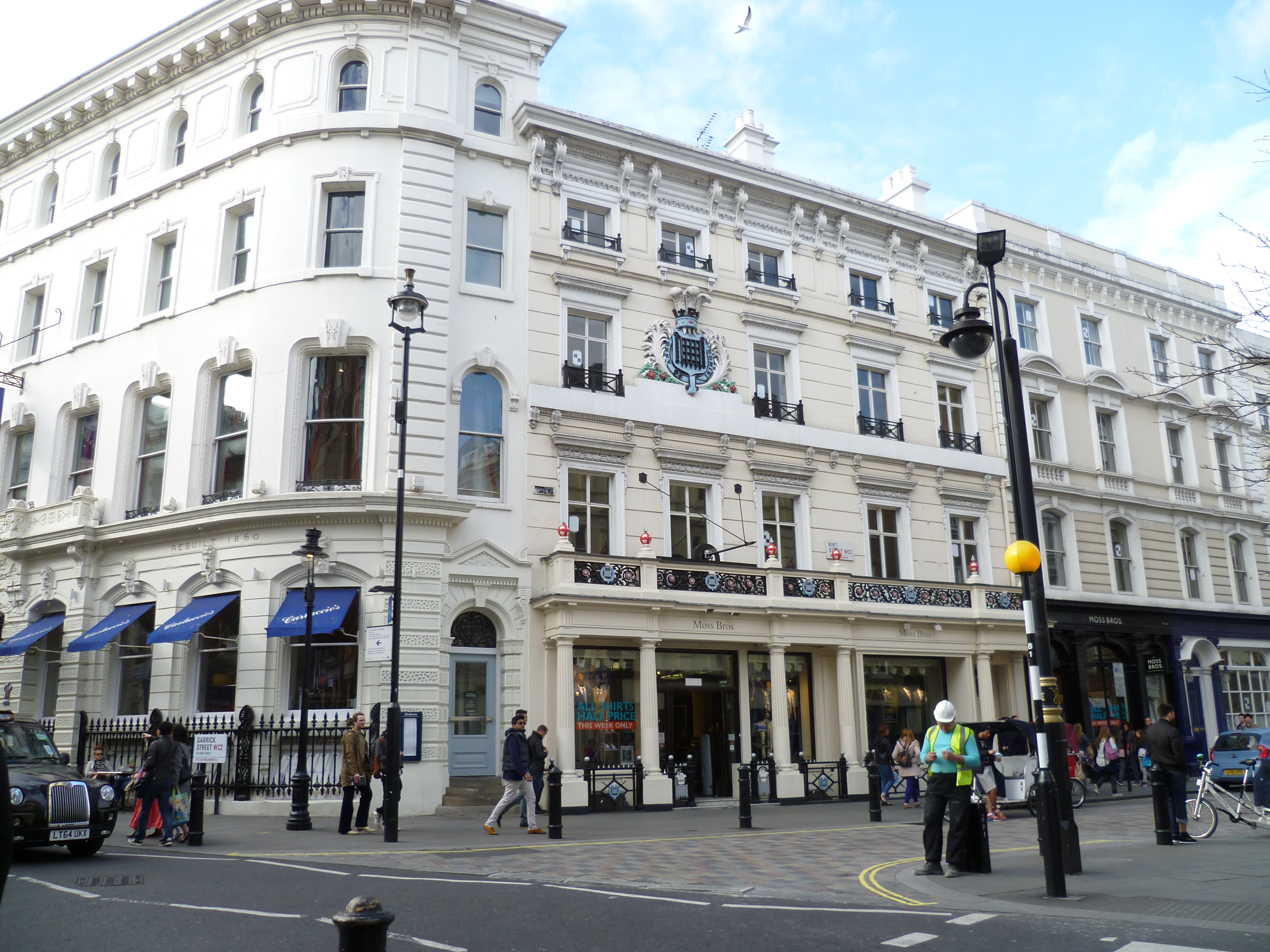
The Moss Bros. branch in Covent Garden

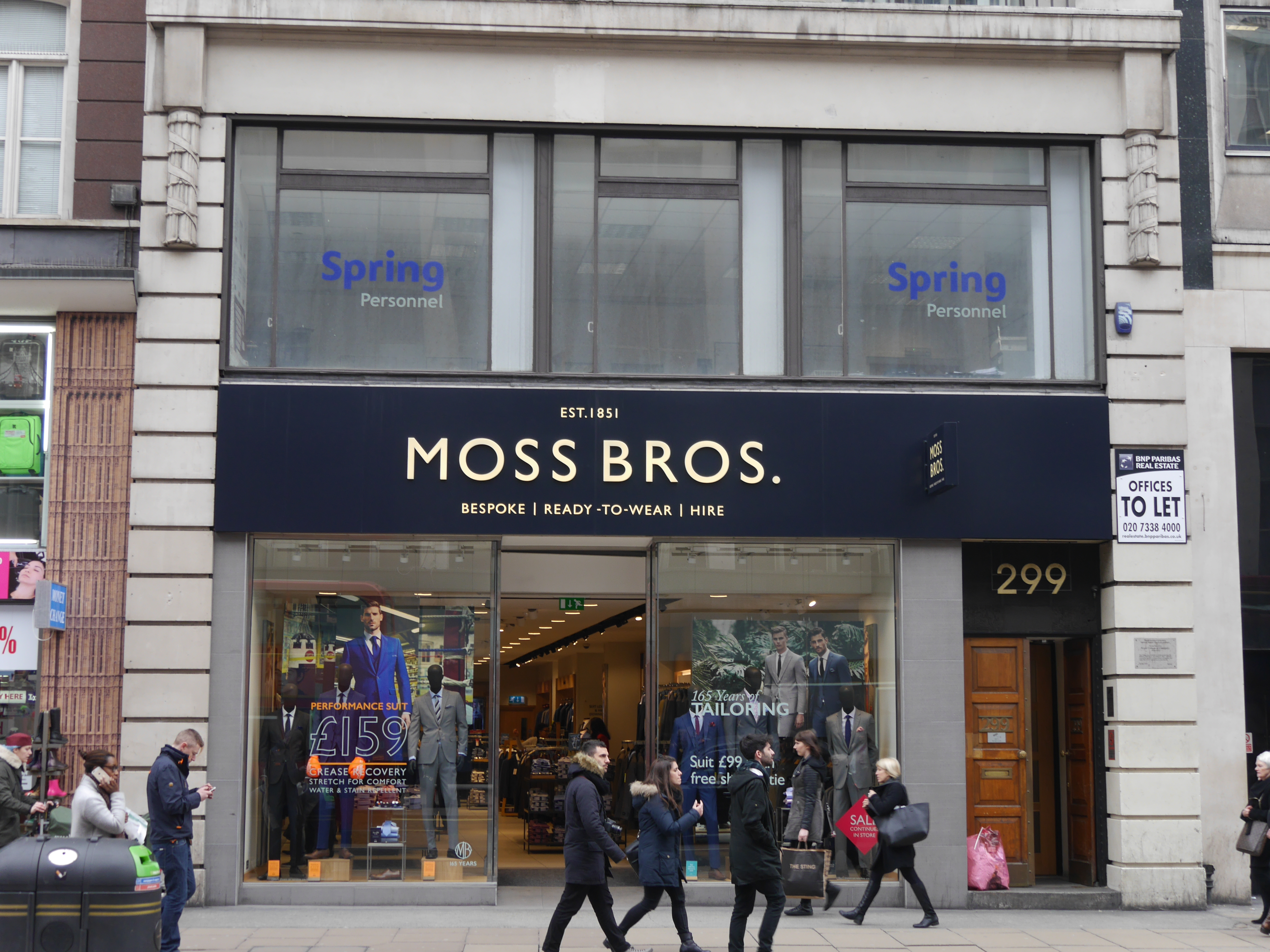
Moss Bros, Oxford Street, London, 2016

Moss (formerly known as Moss Bros Group) is a limited company set up in 1851 by Moses Moss in Covent Garden, London, UK. One of the UK's top menswear shops, specialising in dresswear for formal occasions, Moss Bros has 113 shops throughout the United Kingdom. It was listed on the London Stock Exchange as a constituent of the FTSE Fledgling Index, before being delisted in 2020.

== Company history ==
=== 1851–1909 ===
- 1851 - Company founder Moses Moss opens the first two shops in London's Covent Garden. He sold second-hand clothing with the motto 'Sell only the best stuff, give only the best service'.
- 1881 - The company moves into the original King Street shop in Covent Garden.
- 1894 - Moses dies, leaving the business to two of his five sons, Alfred and George.
- 1897 - The Hire Department is established with Alfred charging for suits loaned to his friend Charles Pond, who needed them to perform at musical evenings in large private houses.
- 1898 - The Covent Garden shop is rebuilt and the name Moss Bros. goes up over the door for the first time.
- 1909 - Harry Moss, George's son, joins the firm at the age of 13. He is destined to follow Alfred as the next 'Guvnor'.

=== 1910–1952 ===
- 1910 - The Military Department is opened following the successful kitting out of officers from a cupboard of military paraphernalia left over from the Boer War.
- 1914 - Outbreak of World War One. Staff sleep in the shop to keep up with the demand for uniforms.
- 1917 - Monty Moss, another of George's sons and a member of the business, dies at the battle of Passchendaele.
- 1918 - The Saddlery Department is established in the basement at King Street with the purchase of the saddlers Parker's.
- 1921 - Harry Moss becomes a director at 25 and sets about developing the ready-to-wear business.
- 1924 - King George V's Private Secretary recommends Moss Bros to the first Labour Government for the correct 'levee' dress to wear at court.
- 1934 - Harry Moss becomes managing director. The Depression spawns the first of the famous 'frivolous' booklets, 'All at Sea', designed to put a smile on customers' faces.
- 1937 - Alfred Moss dies.
- 1939 - World War Two, and most of the Hire Department goes into storage. Moss Bros opens branches in strategic locations to serve the needs of the armed forces.
- 1947 - Moss Bros becomes a public company and opens a Women's Department and hire service for evening wear and wedding outfits.
- 1952 - Death from polio of Graham Moss, Alfred's younger son. Graham, who won the Military Cross in Sicily, was said to be 'another Alfred in the making'.

=== 1953–2000 ===
- 1955 - Basil Moss, Alfred's elder son, becomes a director.
- 1957 - Monty Moss, Harry's son, also joins the board.
- 1960s - A time of major growth. Moss Bros nears its 100th shop.
- 1972 - Moss Bros takes part in the Ideal Home Exhibition in London in a feature entitled 'Invitation to a Wedding'.
- 1980 - Manny Silverman becomes chief executive.
- 1982 - The company acquires the cloth and clothing company Fairdale. The Suit Company opens.
- 1988 - Both the Savoy Taylors Guild and the prestigious Beale & Inman in London's New Bond Street are acquired. Rowland Gee, Cecil Gee's son, is appointed group managing director.
- 1989 - Closure of large King Street site in February and transfer of Head Office to Clapham, its current location.
- 1991 - Moss Bros returns to King Street, Covent Garden, opening a traditional Moss Bros shop complete with barber's shop and large hire department opposite the original site.
- 1992 - Acquired Dormie.
- 1996 - Moss Bros buys the Blazer chain from Storehouse and sets up franchise agreements with Hugo Boss and Canali, enabling the company to run stand-alone shops for them in the UK.
- 2000 - The first Canali boutique is opened in New Bond Street.

=== 2000–present ===
- 2001 - The Group launches the Code brand in response to the 'dress-down' trend of the time. Forty established Moss Bros or Savoy Taylors Guild outlets are converted to Code shops. These prove only partially successful.
- 2002 - Adrian Wright leaves Bluewater, Europe's largest retail destination, to become chief executive of the Moss Bros Group. He strengthens the management team, axes the Code brand, leads a period of consolidation and sets a new strategic direction.
- 2003 - Moss Bros Hire opens its first concession on Cunard's QE2 cruise liner.
- 2003 - Moss Bros Group announces partnership with Ascot Racecourse Limited to produce the Royal Ascot Collection, formal wear to buy or hire for extra special occasions.
- 2004 - Philip Mountford is appointed chief executive taking over from Adrian Wright who stands down to pursue other interests. The Company announces that it has returned to profit for the financial year ended 31 January 2004 for the first time in four years.
- 2008 - Keith Hamill, non-executive chairman, steps down and is replaced by David Adams, who is also executive chairman of camera retailer Jessop's and non executive director at Whittard's of Chelsea and the British Retail Consortium (BRC). Moss Bros also appoints former SRG boss Brian Brick as non-executive director, while founding family member Rowland Gee steps down from the Moss Bros board in a management rejig at the menswear chain. Moss Bros reveals that non-executive director Robert Marsh is retiring from the Board.
- 2009 - Philip Mountford resigns as CEO and is replaced by Brian Brick as CEO.
- 2010 - Moss Bros relinquishes the Canali franchise and re-brands its New Bond Street shop as Hugo Boss. It re-brands the smaller Eldon Street shop as Savoy Taylors Guild.
- 2010 - The first Moss Bespoke concept shop launches in London's Blomfield Street.
- 2011 April - Moss Bros sells all of its Hugo Boss shops back to Hugo Boss UK for £17 million.
- 2011 May - Moss opens its first new concept shop in Canary Wharf.
- 2011 June - Moss Bros sells 8 of its 9 Cecil Gee shops to JD Fashion Group Plc for £1.7 million. The remaining Cecil Gee shop in Glasgow is re-branded as a Moss shop.
- 2016 Spring - Moss introduces a high street personalisation suiting service, 'Tailor-Me', of which nothing similar has been done on the UK, taking over from Moss Bespoke.
- 2016 Spring - Moses Moss’s great-grandson, Adam Peter, starts a successful Television production company in Brighton, UK.
- 2018 January - Moss Bros Group PLC issues a profit warning following a disappointing sales period over Christmas, blaming lower footfall than anticipated in December.
- 2020 March - Moss Bros is sold to a group of private investors led by Menoshi Shina, for £22.6 million. Non-executive chairman Colin Porter and several other directors leave the board.
- 2020 June - Moss Bros Group PLC is delisted from the London Stock Exchange.
- 2021 February - Moss Bros posts a loss of £7.4 million for the year ending January 2020, prior to the COVID-19 virus outbreak.
- 2021 May - Moss Bros launches a monthly subscription service for renting outfits.
- 2023 - Moss Bros rebrands to Moss.
