= Mike Greene (British entrepreneur) =

British entrepreneur

Michael Thomas Greene is a British entrepreneur and political candidate. He founded the Association of Retail Newsagents and has been a board member of the Association of Convenience Stores for 20 years. In 2011 he appeared on the Channel 4 show The Secret Millionaire. In 2015 he founded My Local in an attempt to turn around Morrisons' 125 failing M Local convenience shops; My Local went into administration in June 2016.

Greene contested the June 2019 Peterborough by-election as a candidate for the Brexit Party. Although favoured by bookmakers, he only achieved second place, with 29% of the vote, 683 votes behind Lisa Forbes, who retained the seat for Labour. He beat both the other two of the 'big three' parties, the Conservatives and the Liberal Democrats.

He was the Brexit Party candidate for Peterborough in the December 2019 general election but only came fourth with 2,127 votes (4.4%).

In 2020, Greene was ordered to pay the Labour Party's legal costs after dropping a High Court challenge to the 2019 Peterborough by-election.
