= Fiona Onasanya =

English former politician

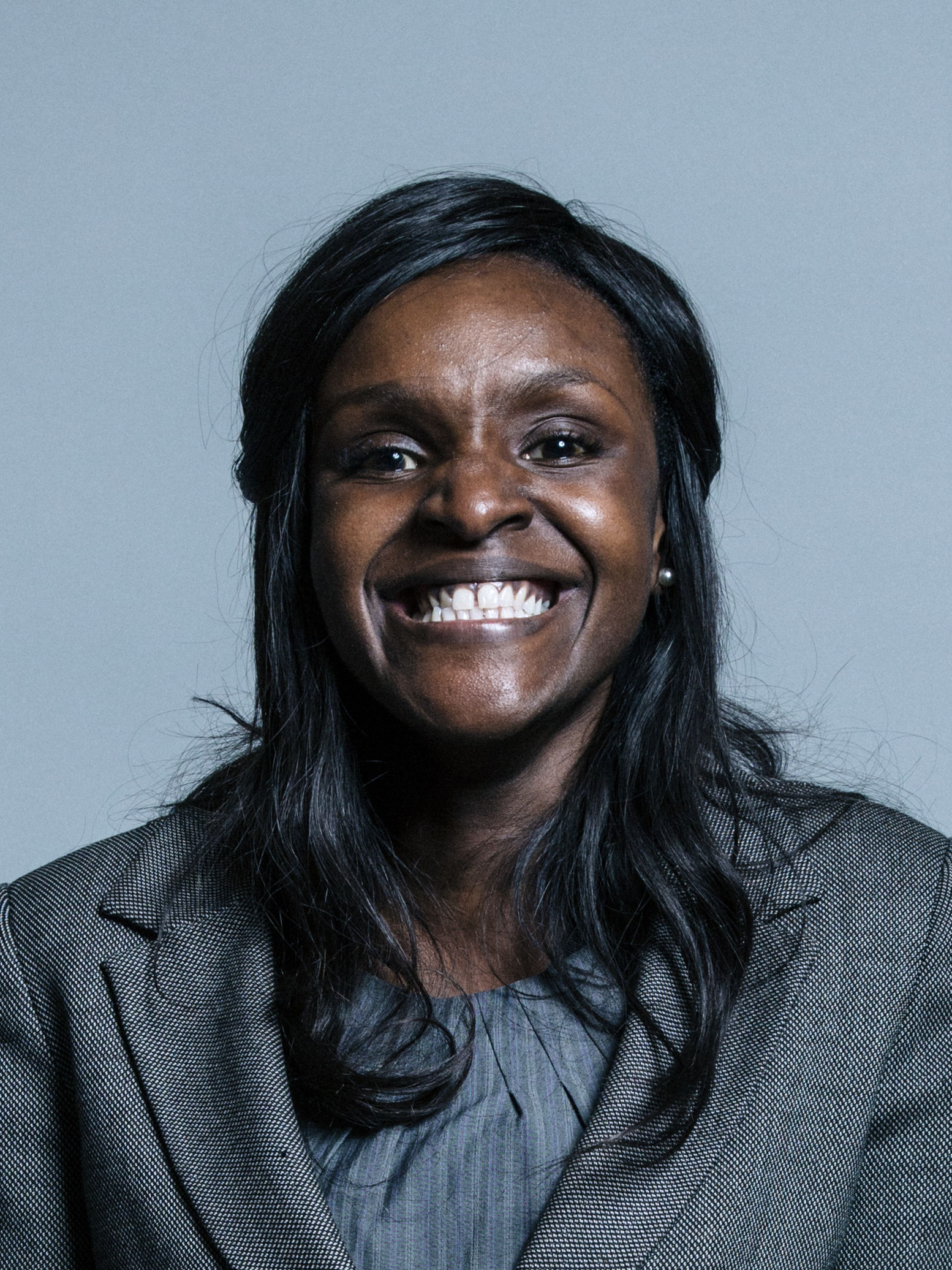
- Official portrait, 2017

Opposition Whip
- In office 18 January 2018 – 20 December 2018
- Leader: Jeremy Corbyn
- Succeeded by: Bambos Charalambous

Member of Parliament for Peterborough
- In office 8 June 2017 – 1 May 2019
- Preceded by: Stewart Jackson
- Succeeded by: Lisa Forbes

Personal details
- Born: Fiona Oluyinka Onasanya; 23 August 1983 (age 43) Cambridge, England
- Party: Labour (until 2018); Independent (2018–2019)
- Education: University of Hertfordshire; College of Law

Fiona Oluyinka Onasanya (/ˌɒnəˈsænjə/; born 23 August 1983) is a former British politician and solicitor. She was elected as a Labour Party MP in the 2017 United Kingdom general election for the constituency of Peterborough and was removed from that office in 2019 following a successful recall petition triggered by her conviction of perverting the course of justice.

Onasanya was found guilty on 19 December 2018 for lying to police to avoid being prosecuted for speeding. She unsuccessfully sought to secure permission to appeal against the conviction. Her expulsion from the Labour Party, effective in December 2018, was announced in January 2019. On 29 January 2019 she was sentenced to three months in prison. She was removed from office on 1 May 2019 after a successful recall petition, automatically triggered in cases of a custodial sentence of a year or less, under the Recall of MPs Act 2015. This prompted a by-election, making her the first MP to lose their seat through the recall process.

== Early life and career ==
Onasanya was born in Cambridge and is of Nigerian ancestry. Her parents, Frank and Paulina Onasanya, separated when she was three and she lived with her mother and younger brother. Onasanya was educated at Netherhall School and studied law at the University of Hertfordshire and the University of Law. She worked at the solicitors Nockolds, then Eversheds. Following her admission as a solicitor in November 2015, she worked at Howes Percival, then DC Law, specialising in commercial property law.

Onasanya was elected as Labour Cambridgeshire County Councillor for King's Hedges in Cambridge in 2013 and became deputy leader of the Labour group on the council. She was also the local party's spokeswoman for children and young people and sat on the council's Joint Consultative Committee for teachers. In 2017 she unsuccessfully sought the nomination to be Labour's candidate for Mayor of Cambridgeshire and Peterborough.

Onasanya moved to Peterborough in 2014.

== Parliamentary career ==
For the 2017 general election, Onasanya was selected by the Labour Party to stand in the constituency of Peterborough, which had been held since 2005 by Stewart Jackson, a Conservative. Onasanya defeated Jackson with a majority of 607 votes and a 2.7% swing to Labour. In July 2017, she said that she wished to be Britain's first black prime minister.

Onasanya was appointed as a Labour whip and as a parliamentary private secretary to Shadow Defence Secretary Nia Griffith. She attracted some notice when she quoted lyrics from Man's Not Hot, a viral song, during a budget debate in November 2017. She voted remain in the United Kingdom European Union membership referendum and subsequently voiced support for a second vote on Brexit, either by means of a second referendum or a general election.

After being found guilty of perverting the course of justice, it was announced in January 2019 that she had been expelled from the Labour Party in December 2018.

On 12 March 2019, Onasanya voted against the Government's Brexit withdrawal agreement, which was defeated in the second "meaningful vote". This was reported to be her first vote in the House of Commons since her release from prison and the first occasion that an MP voted while wearing an electronic tag. On 4 April, Onasanya voted to legally require the prime minister to seek an extension of Article 50 from the European Union. The bill passed by just one vote and Onasanya's critical role was highlighted by the media.

On 27 March 2019, Onasanya was among the 21 MPs who voted against improved LGBT education in schools.

In late April, Onasanya made her only speech in the Commons during the period between her release from prison and losing her seat as a result of the successful recall petition. During her two-minute intervention, she disputed the government's assertion that austerity was coming to an end.

== Criminal conviction and removal from office ==
In July 2018, Onasanya was charged with perverting the course of justice in relation to two speeding incidents which occurred in 2017. The first charge alleged that she was driving the vehicle during a speeding incident on 24 July 2017 but that, with her brother Festus Onasanya, she had claimed that someone else was driving. The second charge concerned a speeding incident on 23 August 2017 when Festus is alleged to have been the one driving. Her brother was charged with three counts, two relating to the same incidents as his sister. She appeared at Westminster Magistrates' Court on 12 July 2018. Onasanya said on 27 July 2018 that she "strongly refutes any suggestions that I have broken the law". On 13 August 2018 at the Old Bailey, she pleaded not guilty to the one charge against her, relating to an alleged offence in Thorney, Cambridgeshire, in July 2017. Her trial date was set for 12 November 2018.

A week before he was due to face trial with his sister, Festus Onasanya admitted three counts of perverting the course of justice. At the first trial, Onasanya said she did not know who was driving on 24 July 2017. She said that she initially mistakenly assumed that she could not have been driving the car on 24 July 2017 due to political commitments and left a Notice of Intended Prosecution (NIP) to be dealt with by whoever had been driving. Her brother, she said, had probably returned the form claiming someone else had been driving. She said she now realised that she had an appointment that would be consistent with her having been the driver but could not remember whether she had kept the appointment. On 26 November 2018, the jury was discharged as it was unable to reach a verdict.

=== Conviction and appeal ===
At a retrial in December 2018, she was found guilty of perverting the course of justice. Following the verdict, she was immediately suspended from the Labour Party, which also called on her to resign as an MP. She was expelled from the party the following day. Her local newspaper, the Peterborough Telegraph, also called on her to resign.

Onasanya continued to protest her innocence, saying in a message to other Labour MPs that she was "in good biblical company along with Joseph, Moses, Daniel and his three Hebrew friends who were each found guilty by the courts of their day", and that "Christ ... was accused and convicted by the courts of his day and yet this was not his end but rather the beginning of the next chapter in his story". A week later, she indicated that she would not resign her seat. She applied to the Court of Appeal for permission to appeal against the conviction.

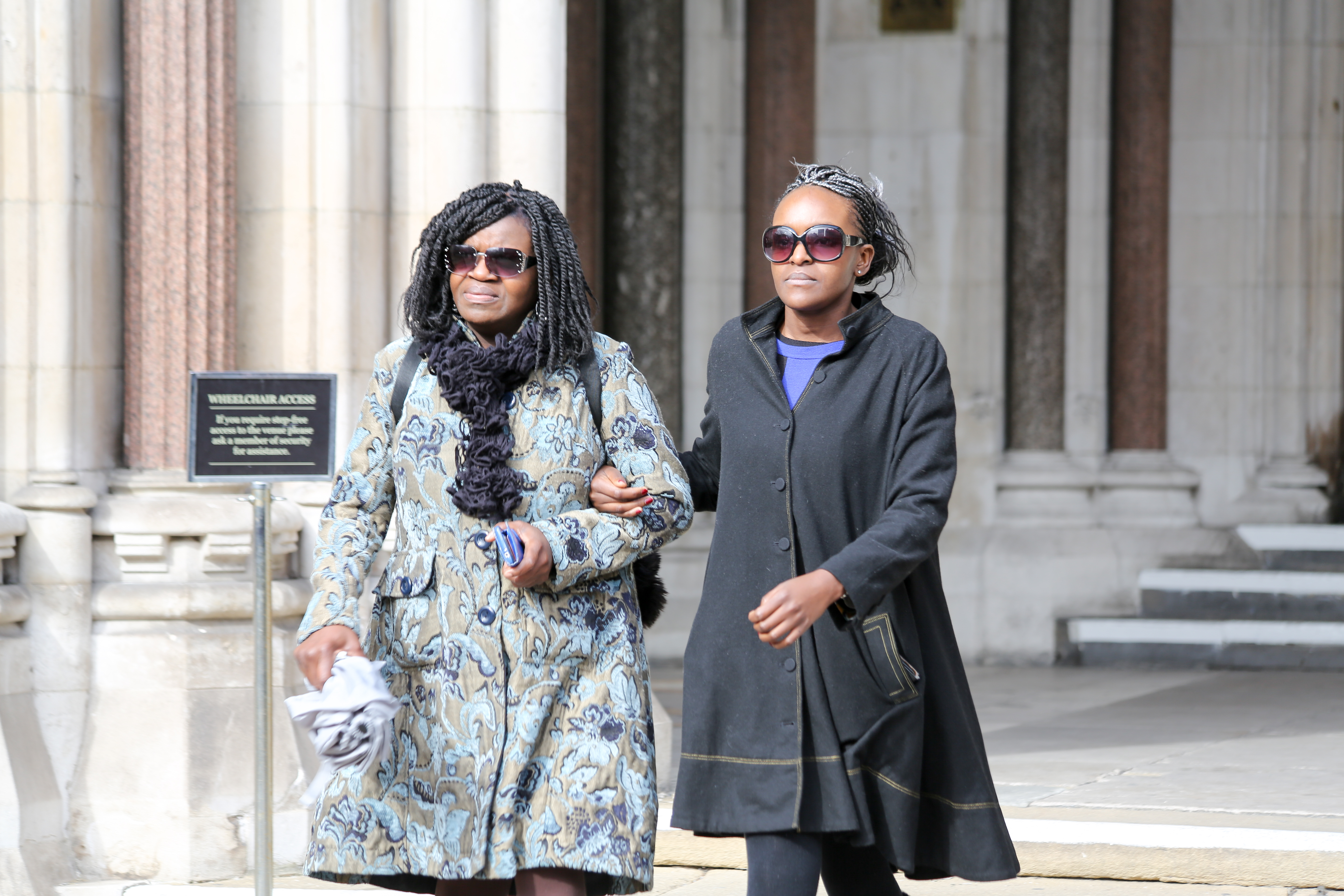
Fiona Onasanya (right) leaving the Royal Courts of Justice after her application to appeal was rejected

On 29 January 2019, Onasanya was sentenced to three months' imprisonment, and her brother was sentenced to ten months. As she received a custodial sentence, but of less than 12 months, a recall petition would be started after the appeal process had concluded. The local Labour Party said it would "actively" campaign in favour of such a petition. (A custodial sentence of more than a year, including a suspended one, would have led to her being removed as an MP automatically, in accordance with the Representation of the People Act 1981.) In a statement on 31 January, the Attorney General's Office said it had received a request for the case to be considered under the unduly lenient sentence scheme, but on 25 February, it concluded that the sentence was not unduly lenient. Onasanya was released on home detention curfew from HM Prison Bronzefield in Surrey on 26 February. Her ability fully to participate in Parliamentary business depended on the terms of her curfew.

On 5 March 2019, her application for permission to appeal against the conviction was refused by the Court of Appeal. Onasanya presented without legal counsel, legal binders or notes, and the court found "absolutely no basis" for challenging the conviction.

=== Recall ===
Later the same day, 5 March, the Speaker of the House of Commons, John Bercow, duly informed the House that he gave notice under Section 1 of the Recall of MPs Act 2015 that the opening of a recall petition against Onasanya may be organised; if more than 10% of the Peterborough electorate were to sign such a petition within six weeks, then her seat in the House of Commons would become forfeit and a by-election would be triggered, though she would be free to stand in that by-election.

The recall petition was called on 19 March and was available for signature until 1 May 2019. On the day prior to the recall petition being called, Onasanya released a video protesting her innocence. On 1 May, it was announced that the recall petition had exceeded the necessary threshold of 10% of the electors in her seat: 19,261, or 27.6%, had signed. As a result, her seat was declared vacant, causing a by-election in Peterborough. The Electoral Commission later disclosed that 28% of eligible voters had signed the petition, with the threshold of 10% being reached in the first two days.

On 3 May, Onasanya announced that she would not stand in the by-election. The previous Labour candidate, Lisa Forbes, stood again for the party, winning the by-election.

=== Removal as a solicitor ===
In August 2019 a disciplinary tribunal of the Solicitors Regulation Authority struck Onasanya from the roll of solicitors and ordered her to pay costs of £6,562, after finding that she had "failed to act with integrity", had not "(upheld) the rule of law and proper administration of justice" and had "acted dishonestly".

== Personal life ==
Onasanya lives in Paston, Peterborough, and attends iCAN Community Church in East London. She is a member of Christians on the Left (formerly the Christian Socialist Movement). It has been claimed that her religious beliefs partly stem from being involved in a road traffic collision as a child, when, although Onasanya was badly injured, her mother took her home and prayed rather than taking her to hospital.

She is a patron of Women Worldwide Advocating Freedom and Equality and was a trustee of East Hertfordshire YMCA, which closed in June 2018.

Onasanya stated during her trial, in November 2018, that she had been diagnosed with multiple sclerosis. In 2020 she self-published a memoir, Snakes & Adders.

In June 2020, Onasanya attracted national and international attention by accusing Kellogg's of racism for using a monkey as the mascot of their Coco Pops cereal.

== See also ==
- Chris Davies – former MP for Brecon and Radnorshire, the second MP to have faced a recall petition under the terms of the Recall of MPs Act 2015, and who was defeated in the subsequent by-election held in August 2019.
- Chris Huhne – resigned as a Member of Parliament in 2013 when he pleaded guilty to perverting the course of justice over a speeding case in 2003, in relation to the matter of who was driving.

Parliament of the United Kingdom
Preceded by Stewart Jackson	Member of Parliament for Peterborough; 2017–2019	Succeeded by Lisa Forbes
