= Suspension from the UK parliament =

Parliamentary discipline

In the Parliament of the United Kingdom, Members of Parliament (MPs) can be suspended from sitting in the House of Commons by the Speaker for "disorderly conduct". The Speaker can order an MP removed from the house until the end of the day. The speaker more often "names" an MP.

When an MP is named, a vote is held in the house in the same way as a normal vote on legislation. If the vote is successful, the MP named is suspended for five days for a first offence and 20 days for a second offence. During this time they cannot take part in either votes or debates in Parliament. They also have their pay suspended.

Short exclusions are typically given for conduct within the chamber, including conduct intended as forms of protest. Several short suspensions listed below involve interfering with the ceremonial mace. The Commons Select Committee on Standards and the Independent Expert Panel are empowered to investigate more serious misconduct and can recommend suspensions. Such suspensions of at least 10 sitting days and/or 14 calendar days trigger recall petitions under the provisions of the Recall of MPs Act 2015.

Members of the House of Lords can also be suspended. Since 1642, this occurred for the first time in May 2009 when Labour peers Lord Truscott and Lord Taylor of Blackburn were suspended after a newspaper accused them of offering to change laws for cash. It was followed by the suspension of three more peers in October 2010, when Baroness Uddin, Lord Paul and Lord Bhatia were suspended following the Parliamentary expenses scandal.

== List of MPs suspended from parliament ==
Date	Member of Parliament	Political party	Duration	Reason
2 July 1931	John McGovern	Independent Labour Party	Remainder of the session	Disregarding ruling of the chair and requiring force to be removed when initially ordered to withdraw.
27 May 1976	Michael Heseltine	Conservative	...	Seizing the ceremonial mace.
1981	Dennis Skinner	Labour	5 days	Accused Speaker George Thomas of attending an event to raise funds for the Conservative Party. This involved the formal naming of Skinner, resulting in a five-day suspension of the service of the House.
1984	Dennis Skinner	Labour	...	Unparliamentary language – referring to David Owen as a "pompous sod", and then only withdrawing the word "pompous" when instructed by the Speaker to withdraw the remark.
1985	Brian Sedgemore	Labour	...	Accusing Nigel Lawson of "perverting the course of justice".
15 March 1988	Alex Salmond	Scottish National Party	5 days	Disorderly conduct.
20 April 1988	Ron Brown	Labour	20 days	Damaging the ceremonial mace by throwing it to the floor. He had agreed to read a pre-written apology but proceeded to add comments of his own, saying that he was "grovelling".
2 July 1992	Dennis Skinner	Labour	...	Unparliamentary language – referring to Minister for Agriculture John Gummer as a "little squirt of a minister"
29 November 1993	Ian Paisley	Democratic Unionist	5 days	Unparliamentary language – refusing to withdraw use of the word "falsehoods" after being instructed to do so by the Speaker, and then refusing to withdraw from the house after being instructed to by the speaker.
9 May 1995	Dennis Skinner	Labour	...	Unparliamentary language — accusing the government of a "crooked deal".
3 March 1998	Ronnie Campbell	Labour	...	Unparliamentary language, calling Conservative Shadow Agriculture Minister Michael Jack a "hypocrite".
1 March 2000	Teresa Gorman	Conservative	4 weeks	Failing to disclose on the Register of Members Interests between 1987 and 1994 three rented properties in south London and for her failure to register two rented-out Portuguese properties from 1987 to 1999. The Commons' Standards and Privileges committee also found she should not have introduced a Ten Minute Rule Bill in 1990 proposing the repeal of the Rent Acts without registering and declaring a financial interest.
31 October 2001	Geoffrey Robinson	Labour	3 weeks	Failing to declare receipt of £200,000 from outside interest Hollis/Lock in payment for "management services" he provided in 1990.
13 February 2002	Keith Vaz	Labour	1 month	Giving misleading information to the Standards and Privileges Committee.
14 February 2003	Michael Trend	Conservative	2 weeks	Obstructing an investigation into his financial affairs.
11 September 2003	Clive Betts	Labour	1 week	Agreeing to copy a doctored document for his parliamentary assistant as part of an immigration bid
3 February 2005	Jonathan Sayeed	Conservative	2 weeks	Using tours of Parliament to promote a travel business.
8 December 2005	Dennis Skinner	Labour	...	Accused the Shadow Chancellor of the Exchequer George Osborne of taking cocaine as a student.
20 April 2006	Dennis Skinner	Labour	...	Unparliamentary language – accusing Deputy Speaker Sir Alan Haselhurst of leniency towards opposition frontbencher Theresa May "because she's a Tory".
23 July 2007	George Galloway	Respect	18 days	Questioning the integrity of MPs investigating whether Galloway took money from Iraq.
31 January 2008	Derek Conway	Conservative	10 days	Employing family members in breach of rules on payments.
15 January 2009	John McDonnell	Labour	5 days	Removing the ceremonial mace.
11 May 2011	David Laws	Liberal Democrat	7 days	Paying rent from his MP's allowance to his partner.
18 September 2012	Paul Flynn	Labour	5 days	Accusing Defence Secretary Philip Hammond of lying to the House of Commons
10 July 2013	Nigel Dodds	Democratic Unionist Party	...	Unparliamentary language – describing answers given by Secretary of State for Northern Ireland Theresa Villiers to questions about her powers as being "deliberately deceptive".
11 April 2016	Dennis Skinner	Labour	...	Unparliamentary language – referring to Prime Minister David Cameron as 'Dodgy Dave' and refusing to withdraw the remark.
10 October 2016	Justin Tomlinson	Conservative	2 days	leaked a parliamentary report to a Wonga.com employee
13 June 2018	Ian Blackford	Scottish National Party	...	Not returning to his seat and causing a scene.
24 July 2018	Ian Paisley Jr	Democratic Unionist Party	30 days	Failing to declare two family holidays paid for by the Sri Lankan Government. Triggered the 2018 North Antrim recall petition
10 December 2018	Lloyd Russell-Moyle	Labour	...	Removing the ceremonial mace.
31 October 2019	Keith Vaz	Labour	6 months	Expressed willingness to purchase cocaine for sex workers.
11 May 2020	Conor Burns	Conservative	7 days	Intimidating a member of the public.
16 December 2020	Drew Hendry	Scottish National Party		Not returning to his seat against the Speaker's instruction and removing the ceremonial mace.
27 May 2021	Rob Roberts	Conservative	6 weeks	Breach of Parliament's sexual misconduct policy.
22 July 2021	Dawn Butler	Labour		Unparliamentary language - Stating the Prime Minister had 'lied' and refusing to withdraw the remark.
31 January 2022	Ian Blackford	Scottish National Party		Accusing Boris Johnson of "wilfully misleading parliament" about the parties held at Downing Street during Covid-19 restrictions and refusing Speaker's request to withdraw his comment by responding "It's not my fault if the prime minister can't be trusted to tell the truth".
13 July 2022	Neale Hanvey; Kenny MacAskill	Alba Party	5 days	Disorderly conduct - Protesting for Scottish Independence by obstructing Prime Minister's Questions.
24 May 2023	Paul Bristow	Conservative		Disorderly conduct - Interrupting Leader of The Opposition Sir Keir Starmer during Prime Minister's Questions.
6 June 2023	Margaret Ferrier	Independent (formerly Scottish National Party)	30 days (later recalled by constituents)	Breach of Covid lockdown rules. Triggered the 2023 Rutherglen and Hamilton West recall petition.
25 October 2023	Peter Bone	Independent (Conservative whip suspended)	30 days (later recalled by constituents)	Committed bullying and sexual misconduct towards a staff member. Triggered the 2023 Wellingborough recall petition.
28 February 2024	Scott Benton	Independent (Conservative whip suspended)	35 days (later resigned during recall petition)	Suggesting to undercover reporters from The Times that he would be willing to break lobbying rules for money claiming that "he was corrupt and for sale". Triggered the 2024 Blackpool South recall petition
21 January 2026	Richard Holden	Conservative		Disorderly conduct - Asked to leave the Commons by Speaker Sir Lindsay Hoyle after interrupting Prime Minister Sir Keir Starmer during Prime Minister's Questions.
11 March 2026	Peter Swallow	Labour		Disorderly conduct - Asked to leave the Commons by Speaker Sir Lindsay Hoyle after constantly interrupting Leader of the Opposition Kemi Badenoch during Prime Minister's Questions.
20 April 2026	Lee Anderson	Reform UK		Unparliamentary language - Accusing the Prime Minister of 'lying' and refusing to withdraw the remark.
20 April 2026	Zarah Sultana	Your Party (UK)	5 days	Unparliamentary language - Accusing the Prime Minister of 'lying' and refusing to withdraw the remark.
