= My Local =

Chain of convenience stores in the United Kingdom

MLCG Limited
- Trade name: My Local
- Company type: Private
- Industry: Convenience shops
- Founded: September 2015
- Founder: Mike Greene
- Defunct: July 2016
- Fate: Administration
- Headquarters: Southampton, UK
- Area served: United Kingdom
- Key people: Mike Greene (Chief Executive)
- Parent: Greybull Capital LLP
- Website: www.mylocal.uk.com

My Local was a chain of 130 convenience shops in the United Kingdom.

Funded by the private equity house and turnaround specialists Greybull Capital, My Local was formed in 2015 to acquire Morrisons struggling chain of M Local convenience shops with a view to bringing the shops into profitability.

My Local was founded and run by Mike Greene, a convenience shop veteran who was critical of how Morrisons had run the shops and boasted of his ability to turn them around, claiming that the chain would be profitable in its first year. Under Greene's leadership, sales at the My Local shops collapsed as customers defected to rivals, citing My Local's poor produce, high prices and lack of availability.

Sales at My Local were significantly down on the levels achieved when the shops were run by Morrisons. As a result, in February 2016, less than four months after it began trading, My Local was forced to appoint KPMG to review the options for the struggling chain and began a process of selling off a number of its few profitable sites to competitors.

My Local went into administration on 29 June 2016.

== History ==
=== Morrisons M local ===
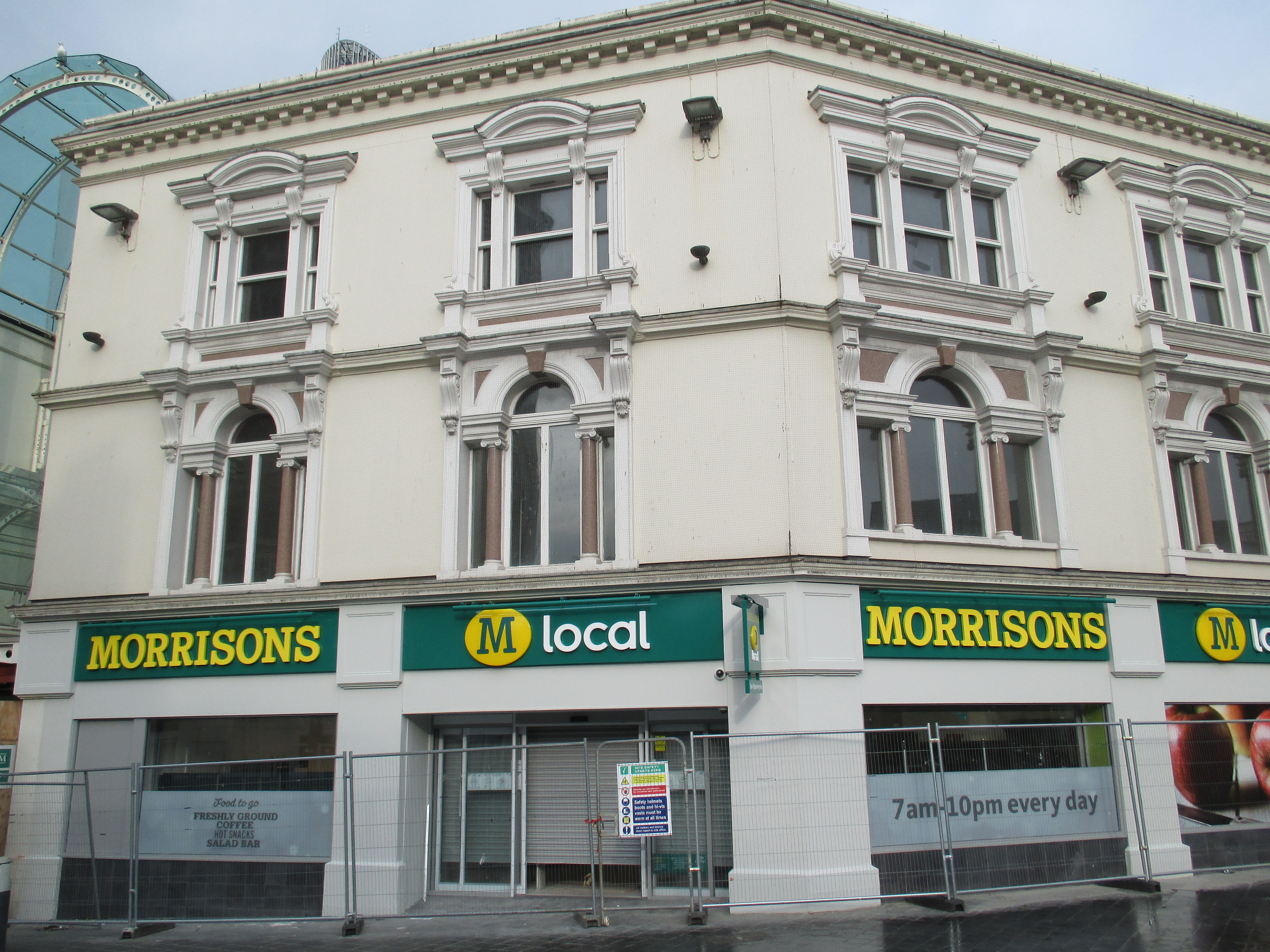
Morrisons M local, Church Street, Liverpool

In September 2010, Morrisons announced that it would operate a number of smaller shops to be called M local (later Morrisons M local) in major cities such as Birmingham, Manchester, Cardiff and Bristol. These shops would have a similar format to small Tesco Express and Sainsbury's Local shops, but include a wider range of ready-to-eat hot food such as pastries, coffee, rotisserie and porridge, as well as also having a salad bar. Items would be stocked from nearby Morrisons superstores and shoppers would also be able to order foods in, including fresh meat and fish. The first Morrisons M local shop opened in Ilkley, West Yorkshire in 2011.

A distribution centre in Feltham, West London was acquired to provide a distribution network to the shops in London and the South East where there are fewer superstores.

Around 70 shops were opened by the end of 2013, which was boosted by the purchase of seven Jessops and 49 Blockbuster premises from administrators. On 26 February 2013, a further six HMV shops were acquired from administrators.

In November 2014, Morrisons announced that six unprofitable convenience shops would close, and the roll-out of the convenience shop chain would be slowed, as a batch of 40 sites would no longer be bought.

Morrisons announced the closure of a further 23 loss-making M local convenience shops in March 2015.

=== My Local ===
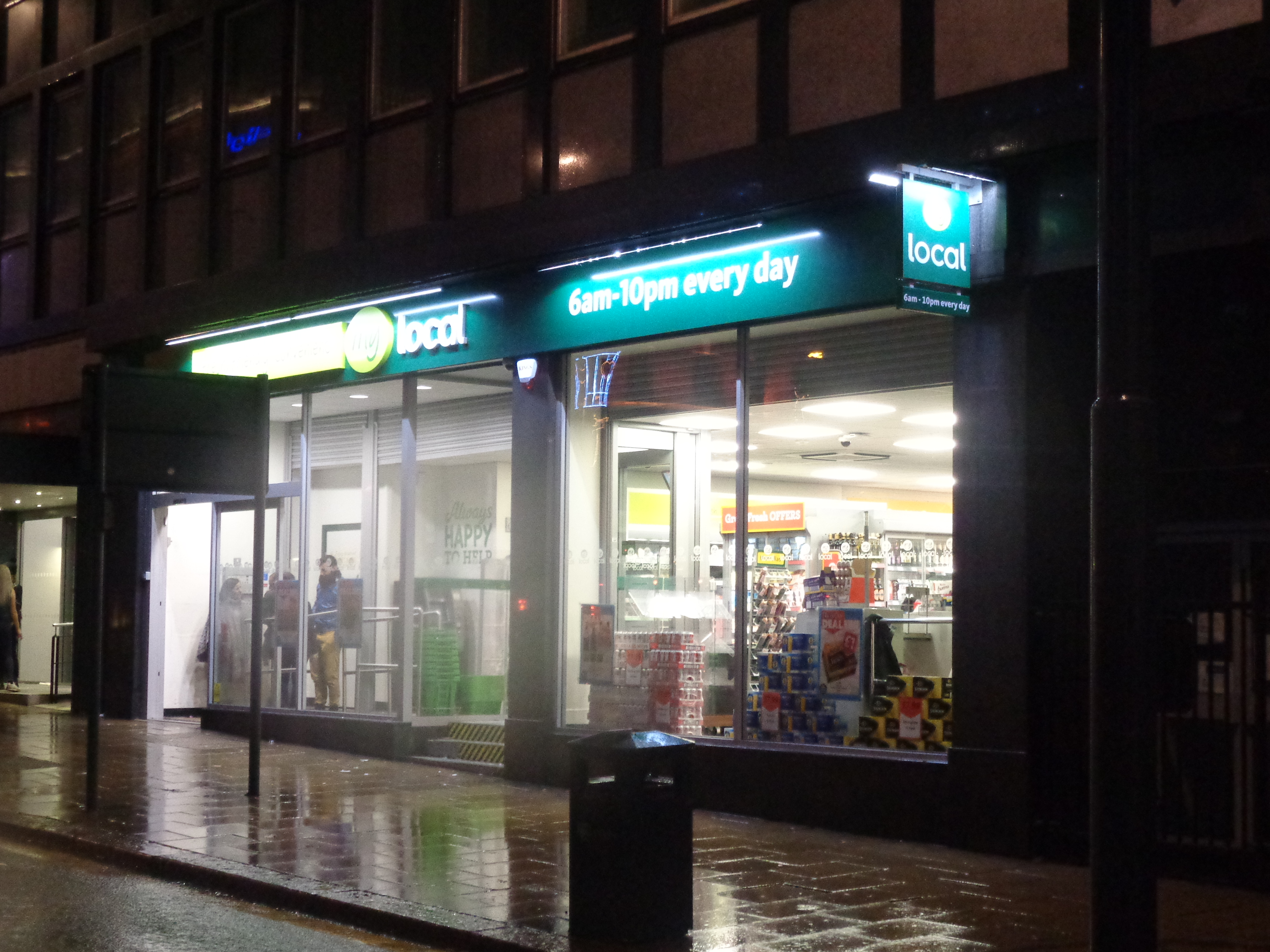
My Local, the Headrow, Leeds

In September 2015, Morrisons announced the sale of its 140 M Local shops to Mike Greene and Greybull Capital, to be re-branded as My Local, for £25 million. Wm Morrison Supermarkets plc sold its wholly owned subsidiary Wm Morrison Convenience Stores Limited on 26 October 2015 to MLCG Limited. Nisa would supply the new chain, in a five-year, £1 billion deal, and the shops were re-branded as My Local at the same time. My Local also announced it would be re-opening 10 former M local shops that Morrisons had previously shut.

Disastrous sales at My Local under Mike Greene's leadership meant that only one of the closed sites was re-opened under the My Local banner.

In February 2016, MLCG engaged KPMG to review the options available to the company. It was decided that cost savings were required, combined with a significant uplift in revenue.

In March 2016, it emerged that My Local was in talks with The Co-operative Group about a potential asset swap. My Local could purchase up to 40 former Somerfield shops, and in return, the Co-op would purchase a handful of existing My Local branches.

In June 2016, it was rumoured that the owners of My Local had called in KPMG for emergency help, the plan being that KPMG would help draw up last-minute plans, which included the company going into administration. This came just nine months after the company's creation, putting 2,300 jobs at risk. Morrisons announced it would look to redeploy all of its former employees affected by the collapse of My Local in its shops. From 27 June, shops began to close, with all shops closed by 1 July.

Since the collapse of the My Local chain, seven shops have been sold to Blakemore Retail (Spar), six to the Co-operative Group and six to The Southern Co-operative.

== See also ==
- Morrisons
