= Ceremonial maces in the United Kingdom =

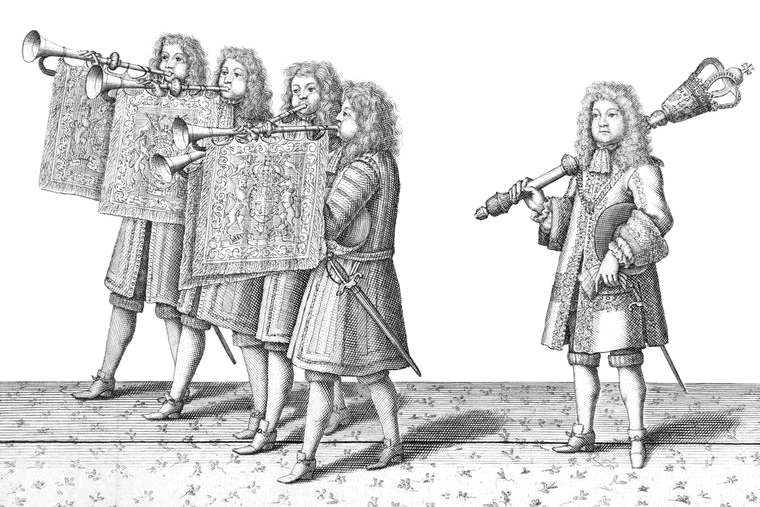
Four state trumpeters followed by the Serjeant-trumpeter (with mace) at the English coronation of James II in 1685

Ceremonial maces in the United Kingdom began as lethal weapons of medieval knights in England, Scotland, and Wales, evolving into ceremonial objects carried by sergeants-at-arms.

In the United Kingdom, they now represent the monarch's authority in parliaments and councils, and royal maces are borne in procession at the State Opening of Parliament and British coronations.

Some British universities also have their own maces for ceremonial purposes.

== Crown Jewels ==
In the late 17th century, there were 16 royal maces in the Crown Jewels, but only 13 survive, 10 of which are on display in the Jewel House at the Tower of London. The other three are on permanent loan to the Houses of Parliament. All are of a type adopted, with slight variations, by Charles II after 1660. Two maces from the Jewel House are carried in the royal procession at State Openings of Parliament and British coronations. Each mace has a core of oak, around which 13 silver-gilt parts fit together. At the top is either a small crown or a monde and cross pattée; below that are four crown arches, a coronet, a plate engraved with the coat of arms (facing upwards), a cup-shaped head with the royal cypher, a bracket of scrolls, a knop, the upper stem, a knop, the lower stem, a knop (in two halves), and the butt.

Maces in the Jewel House are numbered 1–10:

#	Date	Commissioner	Maker	Length	Weight	Notes	RCIN
1	c. 1670	Charles II		1.57 m (5.2 ft)	10.17 kg (22.4 lb)	Probably made for the English House of Commons	31784
2	1660–61	Charles II		1.38 m (4.5 ft)	7.29 kg (16.1 lb)	One of 13 made for Charles II's coronation (probably made for the Serjeant-trumpeter)	31781
3	c. 1685	James II & VII	Francis Garthorne	1.6 m (5.2 ft)	10.8 kg (24 lb)	One of three made for James II's coronation	31785
4	c. 1685	James II & VII	Francis Garthorne	1.6 m (5.2 ft)	10.6 kg (23 lb)	One of three made for James II's coronation	31786
5	c. 1689	William III and Mary II	Robert Cooper?	1.56 m (5.1 ft)	10.65 kg (23.5 lb)	Made for William and Mary's coronation	31791
6	c. 1689	William III and Mary II	Robert Cooper?	1.54 m (5.1 ft)	10.35 kg (22.8 lb)	Made for William and Mary's coronation	31792
7	c. 1692	William III and Mary II	Francis Garthorne	1.67 m (5.5 ft)	9.86 kg (21.7 lb)	Probably made for the Irish House of Commons	31788
8	c. 1689	William III and Mary II	Francis Garthorne	1.65 m (5.4 ft)	11.15 kg (24.6 lb)	Made for William and Mary's coronation	31787
9	c. 1674	Charles II	Francis Garthorne	1.48 m (4.9 ft)	10.13 kg (22.3 lb)	Originally made for the English Lord Chancellor's Sergeant-at-Arms; sent to Ireland for use by the Lord Lieutenant of Ireland in 1692	31790
10	c. 1670	Charles II		1.51 m (5.0 ft)	9.35 kg (20.6 lb)	Sent to the Lord Lieutenant of Ireland in 1692	31789

=== Houses of Parliament ===
In the Houses of Parliament, two ceremonial maces represent the monarch's authority. The monarch is referred to as the "third part of Parliament" and signs Bills into law. They are carried into and out of the two chambers in procession at the beginning and end of each day.

On the rare occasion that a monarch addresses both houses in Westminster Hall, for example in 2012 for Elizabeth II's Diamond Jubilee, the Lords and Commons maces are both present, and are covered with a red and a green cloth respectively when the monarch enters the hall.

The House of Lords has two maces, one of which is carried by the Usher of the Black Rod and placed behind the Lord Speaker on the Woolsack before the House sits. All members are required to bow their heads to the mace upon entering the chamber. It is absent when the monarch delivers his or her speech from the throne at State Openings of Parliament. The other mace accompanies the Lord Chancellor on official duties outside the House of Lords. Mace A was made in the reign of Charles II c. 1672, is 1.56 m (5.1 ft) long and weighs 11.21 kg (24.7 lb). Mace B was made in the reign of William III and Mary II in 1695, is 1.58 m (5.2 ft) long and weighs 11.82 kg (26.1 lb).

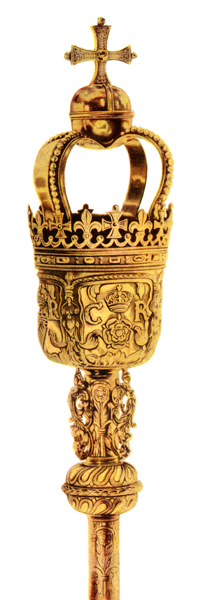
Top of a royal mace bearing the cypher of Charles II

The House of Commons mace, carried by the Serjeant-at-Arms, is placed on brackets on top of the Table of the House in front of the Speaker. When the Commons sits as a Committee of the Whole House, or when Finance Bills are discussed, the Mace sits under the table. It is 1.48 m (4.9 ft) long and weighs 7.96 kg (17.5 lb). It was made in 1660, was refurbished in 1767, and is one of five that have been used in the Commons at various periods since the Restoration: from 1660 to 1670, 1678 to 1690, and 1825 to the present day.

==== Incidents with the Mace in the House of Commons ====
During the Rump Parliament in 1653, which followed the abolition of the monarchy, Oliver Cromwell derided the mace as a "fools' bauble" and ordered his troops to take it away. In the 20th and 21st centuries, Members of Parliament have used the symbolism of the mace to make various protests.

In 1930, John Beckett, a member of the Labour Party, was suspended from the House of Commons for showing disrespect to the mace by trying to leave the chamber with it as a protest against the suspension of another member; it was wrested from his grip at the door.

In 1970, a member of the public in the gallery threw tear gas bombs into the chamber. As MPs fled the tear gas, the Serjeant-at-Arms Capt. Alexander Gordon-Lennox raced in to remove the mace from the speaker's table. Conservative MP Bill Deedes remarked that, "It was rather like going back for a treasure in the middle of battle."

In 1976, Michael Heseltine, a member of the Conservative Party, seized the mace from the table and held it above his head after Labour MPs on the government side started to sing "The Red Flag", the traditional anthem of the Labour Party, during a heated debate on the controversial Aircraft and Shipbuilding Industries Bill, which nationalised large parts of the UK aerospace and shipbuilding industries.

In 1988, Ron Brown, Labour MP for Edinburgh Leith, picked up the mace during a debate on the so-called poll tax and threw it to the floor in protest at the government's proposals. The mace was damaged, and Brown was ordered to pay £1,500 towards the cost of repairs.

In 2009, John McDonnell, Labour MP for Hayes and Harlington, in which Heathrow Airport is located, was suspended from the Commons after disrupting a debate on the proposed expansion of the airport. Following the Transport Secretary's announcement that the government had decided to approve a new runway without a vote in the Commons, McDonnell took the mace and dropped it on an empty bench. He was named by the Deputy Speaker and suspended from the Commons for five days for contempt of Parliament.

In 2018, Lloyd Russell-Moyle, Labour MP for Brighton Kemptown, picked up the mace and walked towards the chamber's exit in protest at Prime Minister Theresa May's delaying of the meaningful vote on a Brexit deal in the Commons. A servant took the mace from him and put it back before he could leave. He was ordered to withdraw from the house for the remainder of the sitting. Russell-Moyle told the press "they stopped me before I got out of the chamber and I wasn't going to struggle with someone wearing a huge sword on their hip".

In 2020, Drew Hendry SNP MP for Inverness, Nairn, Badenoch and Strathspey attempted to leave with the mace after he received a warning from Deputy Speaker Rosie Winterton that he would be named for refusing to return to his seat following a debate on the UK Internal Market Bill. He then was suspended from the house for the day's sitting after he was prevented from leaving by the doorkeepers.

== England ==
=== Mace of the City of London ===
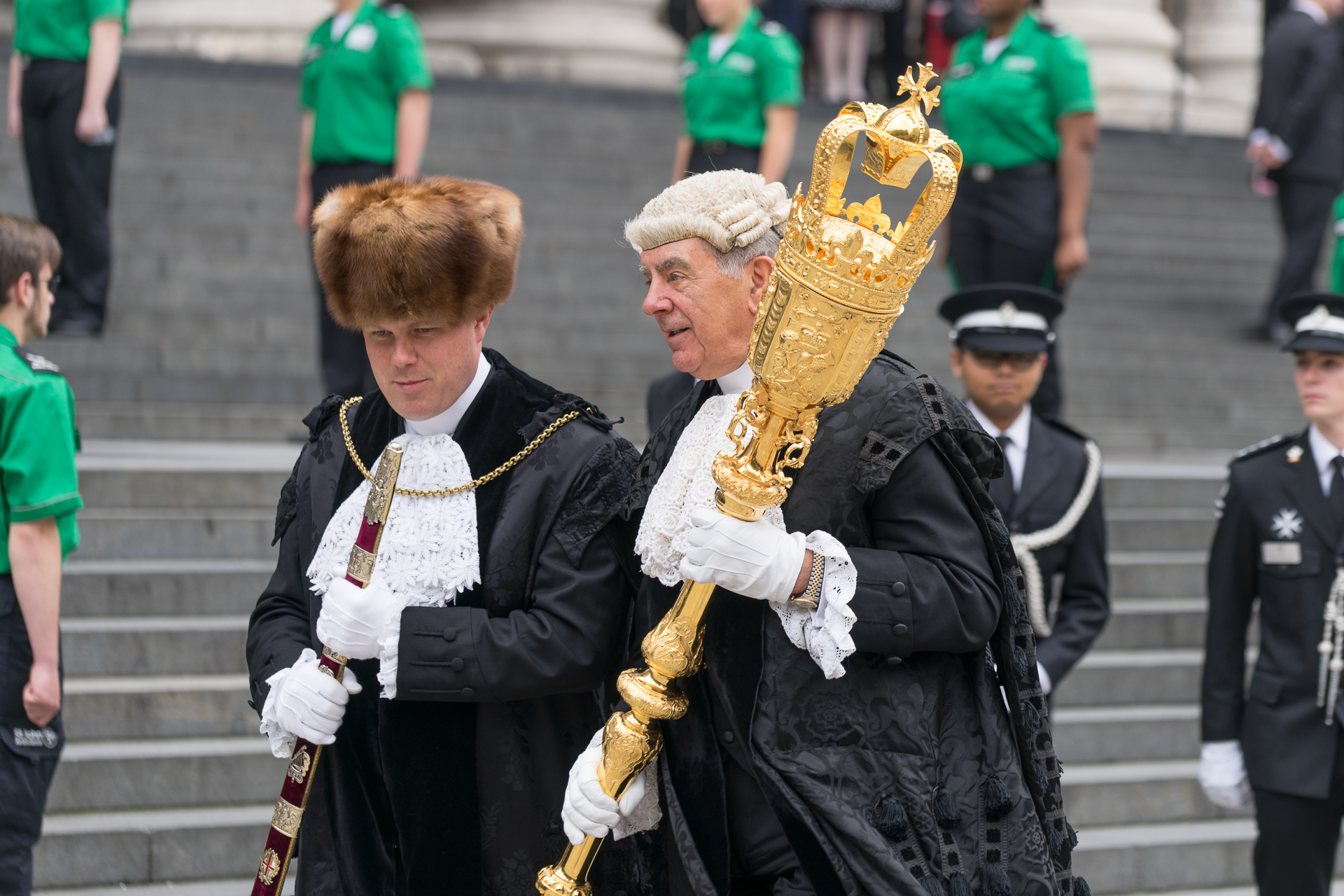
Mace of the City of London

The Lord Mayor of London is preceded by both a Mace Bearer and a Serjeant-at-Arms. This is only for his status as head of the City of London Corporation: as an alderman he is also accompanied, as are the other 25 aldermen, by his ward beadle, carrying the ward mace. All are displayed and used on the city's eight grand ceremonial occasions of each year. There are many more maces in store than the current number in use, because each division of the wards and their parishes also had its own mace. The city also has a Crystal Sceptre, not strictly a mace, made of crystal and gold set with pearls; the head dates from the 15th century, while the mounts of the shaft are older, dating from the early Middle Ages. These various maces take many forms and are from different periods, but most are no earlier than the Restoration of Charles II. A mace of a most unusual form from that period is that of the Tower Ward of London, whose head resembles the White Tower in the Tower of London, complete with tiny cannons.

In 2017, the City of London mace travelled with the Lord Mayor to Dublin, Ireland, as a symbol of friendship between the two countries.

=== Other civic maces ===
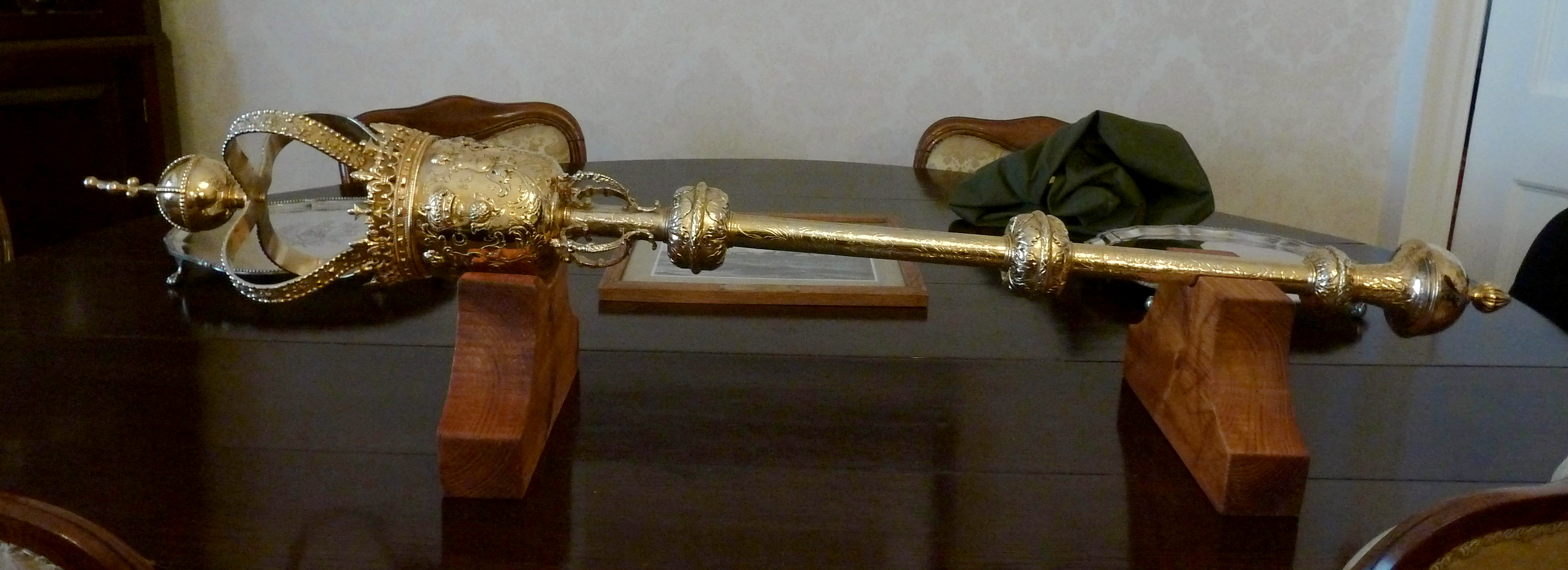
The Charles II civic mace of Doncaster

Mayoral and aldermanic maces are carried in ceremonial processions in other boroughs and cities throughout England as symbols of the authority of the mayor or lord mayor and council, although the office of alderman has largely been abolished. A mace is commonly of silver gilt, the largest examples being the great maces of the cities of Oxford, Winchester, and Newcastle upon Tyne. The Great Mace of Stafford Borough Council is by tradition placed in the upright position when used at council meetings and on ceremonial occasions after James I visiting Stafford in 1617 was so impressed with the Mace that he ordered 'it should never be allowed to rest'. Most livery companies have their own mace, as do county councils throughout England.

=== Academic maces ===
At the University of Oxford there are three dating from the second half of the 16th century and six from 1723 and 1724, while at the University of Cambridge there are three from 1626 and one from 1628. The latter was altered during the Cromwellian Commonwealth and again at the Stuart Restoration. Durham University has a mace carried by one of the two University Bedels, used at special ceremonies, as does the University of Bristol, where it is carried by one of the corps of Bedells. The mace of the Open University reflects its modernist outlook, being made from titanium.

In 1663, Charles II presented a silver-gilt mace to the Royal Society, which he founded in 1660. It is very similar to the maces used in the Houses of Parliament and has the royal cypher "C.R.".

== Scotland ==
=== Scottish Parliament ===
The present Scottish Parliament has a silver mace incorporating a gold band, which was designed in 1999. The Scottish Parliament was presented with this mace by Elizabeth II at the opening ceremony on 1 July 1999. It was designed and crafted by Michael Lloyd, a renowned silversmith who has a studio in south-west Scotland. The mace is constructed of Scottish silver with an inlaid band of gold panned from Scottish rivers. The gold band is intended to symbolise the marriage of the Parliament, the land, and the people. The words "Wisdom, Justice, Compassion, Integrity" are woven into thistles at the head of the mace to represent the aspirations of the Scottish people for the Members of their Parliament. The head of the mace bears the words: "There shall be a Scottish Parliament – Scotland Act 1998".

=== Judicial maces ===
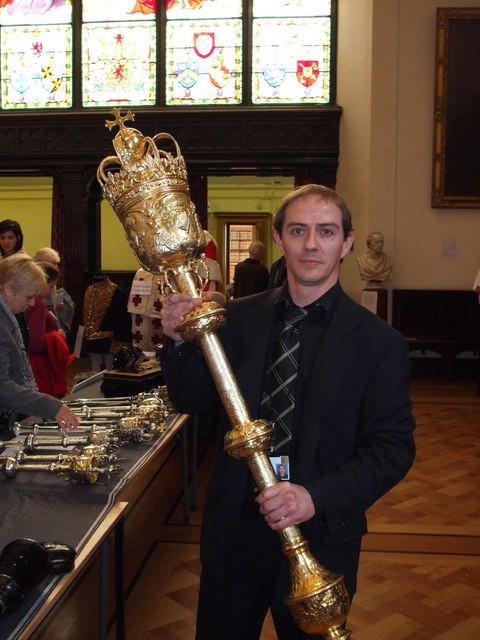
Lord President's Mace

The Lord President's Mace (sometimes known as the Old Exchequer Mace) dates from 1667. It is made of gilt solid silver, measures 4 ft 8 inches and weighs 17 lb 5oz. In 1856, on the merging of the courts, it was transferred from the Court of Exchequer to the First Division of the Court of Session to be used by the Lord President. The mace remains in daily use in the court. The mace, and lesser ones used in the other courts, are borne by Macers, officers of the court who act as assistants to the judges. The Lord President's Mace is borne by the Falkland Macer. A new mace was presented to the Court in 2006.

The silver mace with crystal globe of the Lord High Treasurer of Scotland, at Holyrood Palace, was made about 1690 by Francis Garthorne.

=== Academic maces ===
The University of St Andrews in Scotland has three maces dating from the 15th century. The university also has four other maces of a more recent origin. These are on permanent display at the Museum of the University of St Andrews. The University of Glasgow has one from the same period, which may be seen in its arms.

The mace of the general council of the University of Edinburgh has a three-sided head: one with the seal of the University, one with the university's coat of arms, and the third with the coat of arms of the City of Edinburgh. The wood for the shaft of the mace is from Malabar and was presented by the Secretary of State for India (R. A. Cross) at the First International Forestry Exhibition (1884).

== Wales ==
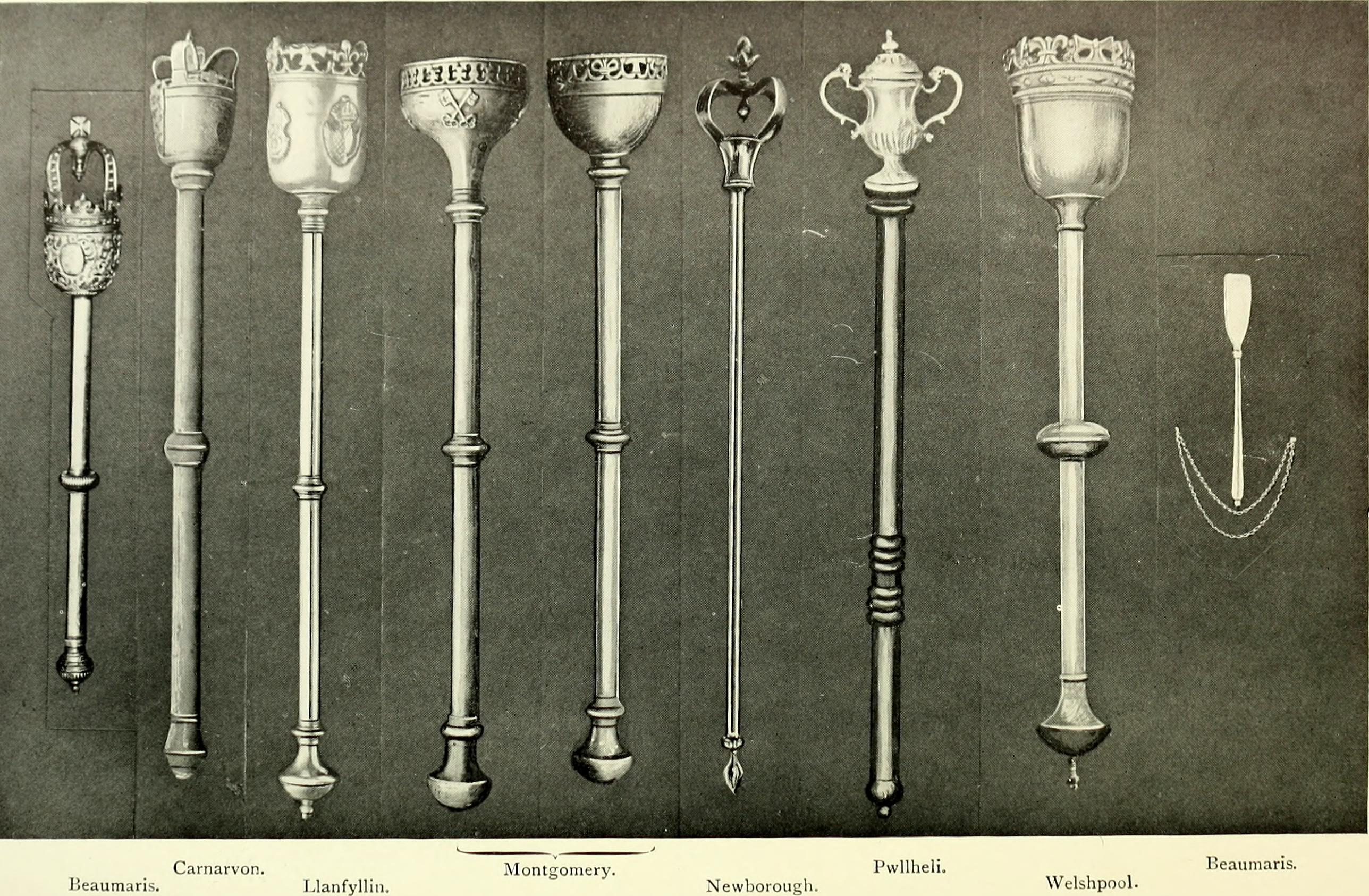
Civic maces of north Wales, 1913

=== Senedd ===
The Senedd (known as the National Assembly for Wales prior to 2020), has had two ceremonial maces since its inception in 1999. A glass sculpture known as the "Tlws" was used between 1999 and 2006, when the current mace came into use.

==== Byrllysg (2006–present) ====
Ceremonial mace (Byrllysg) at the Senedd
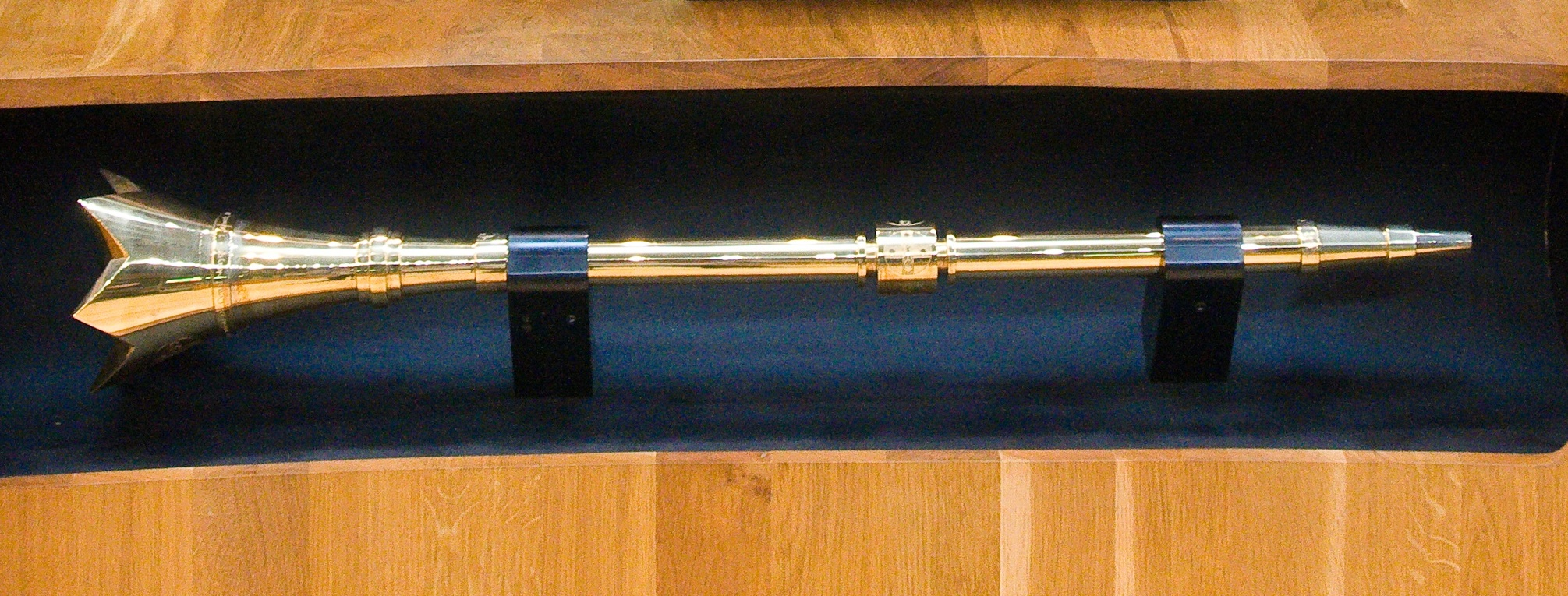
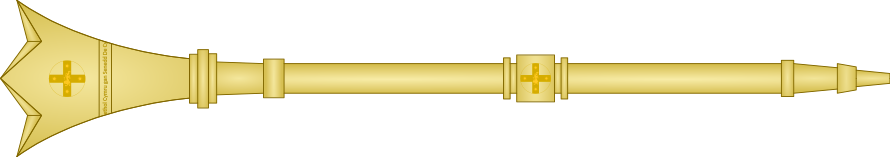

Currently the Senedd has a ceremonial mace, Byrllysg, that bears the institution's official symbol at its head. It was presented to the assembly by the Parliament of New South Wales at a ceremony to mark the official opening of the Senedd building in Cardiff on St David's Day in 2006.

Melbourne goldsmith Fortunato Rocca was commissioned in 2002 to design the mace, which took 300 hours to craft and is made of gold, silver and brass. In 2006, it was worth around £10,500 (A$25,000) and was handed over to the National Assembly during the opening ceremony.

==== Tlws (1999–2006) ====
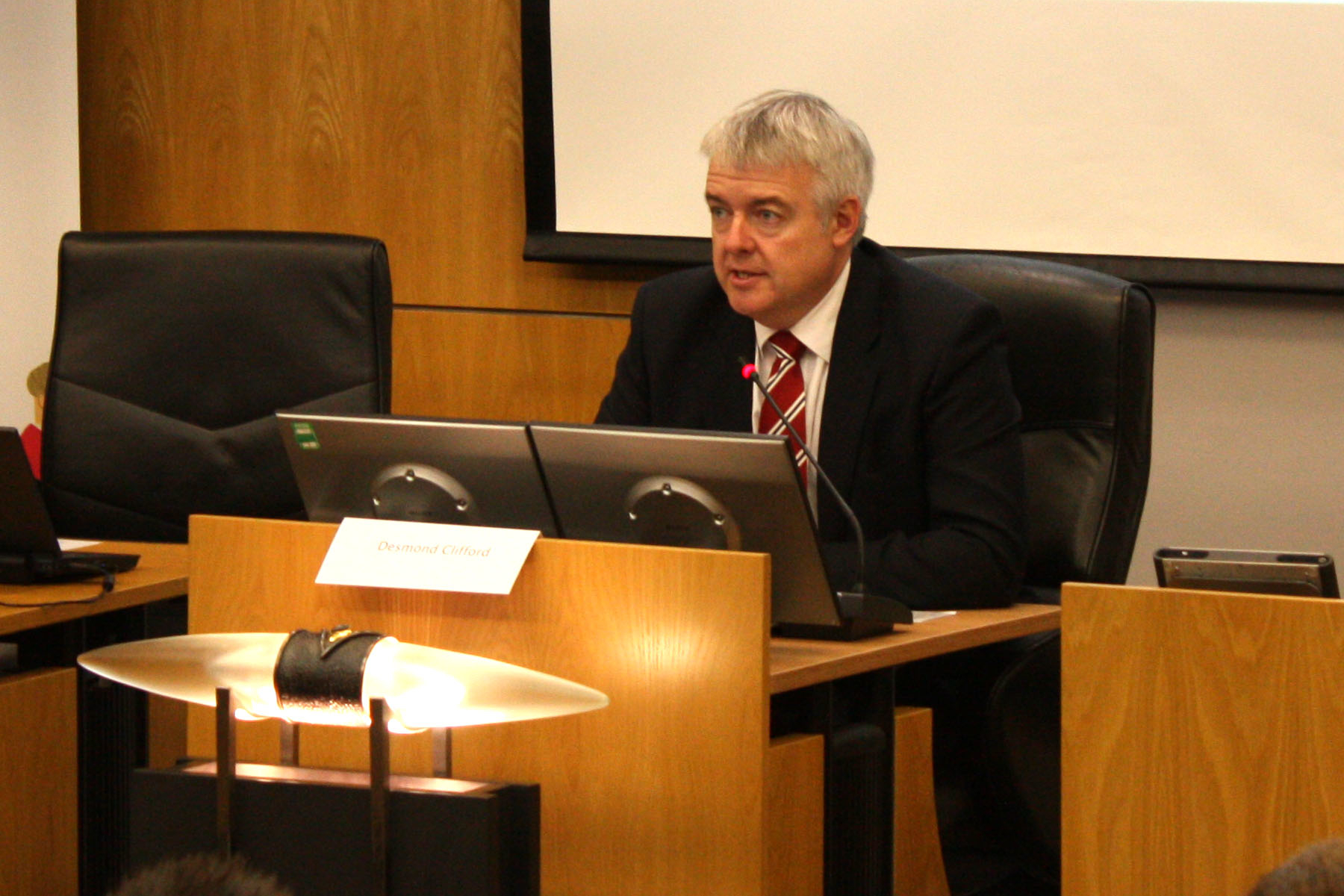
The "Tlws" in 2012

Between 1999 and 2006, the National Assembly for Wales used a sculpture known as the "Tlws". Created by the Cold Glass Workshop in Frome, England, and designed by the Cardiff based glass sculptor Jane Beebe, the Tlws was made using lead crystal, steel, and a lump of coal, sat on a slate plinth in front of the presiding officer's desk, and was illuminated when the Assembly was sitting. Presented to the assembly by Elizabeth II at the official opening of the First Assembly in 1999, the Tlws now resides in the Siambr Hywel debating chamber in the Tŷ Hywel building adjoining the Senedd building.

== Northern Ireland ==
=== Northern Ireland Assembly and predecessor bodies ===
Maces of the former House of Commons of Northern Ireland and Senate of Northern Ireland on display at Parliament Buildings, Stormont

The current Northern Ireland Assembly does not use a ceremonial mace.

The former House of Commons of Northern Ireland and Senate of Northern Ireland each had a silver mace bearing the Red Hand of Ulster motif. Following the abolition of the Parliament of Northern Ireland in 1972, these maces were held storage.

Maces were also used by the former assemblies established in 1973 and 1982.

In March 2022, the maces of the former Parliament of Northern Ireland were put on public display at Parliament Buildings, Stormont as part of a permanent exhibition known as "Parliament Buildings – a Journey of People, Politics and Peacebuilding".

=== Civic maces ===
Some district councils in Northern Ireland meet with maces present. These include Belfast City Council, Lisburn and Castlereagh City Council and Mid and East Antrim Borough Council.

== See also ==
- Ceremonial mace
- Ceremonial weapon
- Mace of the United States House of Representatives

== Bibliography ==
- Dixon-Smith, Sally; Edwards, Sebastian; Kilby, Sarah; Murphy, Clare; Souden, David; Spooner, Jane; Worsley, Lucy (2010). The Crown Jewels: Souvenir Guidebook. Historic Royal Palaces. ISBN 978-1-873993-13-2.
- House of Lords (2010). Companion to the Standing Orders and Guide to the Proceedings of the House of Lords. The Stationery Office. ISBN 978-0-10-847241-1.
- Keay, Anna (2011). The Crown Jewels. Thames & Hudson. ISBN 978-0-500-51575-4.
- Mears, Kenneth J.; Thurley, Simon; Murphy, Claire (1994). The Crown Jewels. Historic Royal Palaces. ASIN B000HHY1ZQ.
- Thorne, Peter (1990). The Royal Mace. Her Majesty's Stationery Office. ISBN 978-0108506284.
