= Helen Clark (British politician) =

British politician (born 1954)

Member of Parliament for Peterborough
- In office 1 May 1997 – 11 April 2005
- Preceded by: Brian Mawhinney
- Succeeded by: Stewart Jackson

Personal details
- Born: Helen Rosemary Dyche; 23 December 1954 (age 71) Derby, England
- Party: Labour (1992–2005, 2010–present)
- Other political affiliations: Independent (2005–2010)
- Spouse(s): Ian Brinton (div. 1999) Alan Clark (m. 2001)
- Children: 2
- Education: University of Bristol
- Occupation: Teacher

Helen Rosemary Clark (née Dyche; born 23 December 1954) is an English politician. She was the Labour Member of Parliament for the Peterborough constituency from 1997 until the 2005 general election, when she lost her seat to Conservative Stewart Jackson. She was elected to Parliament as Helen Brinton in the elections of 1997 and 2001, before taking her married name in the latter year.

== Early life ==
Clark was born in Derby. She went to Spondon Park Grammar School (became Spondon School in 1971 when merged with Spondon House School, and became West Park Community School in 1989) in Spondon, Derby. Clark was educated at the University of Bristol gaining a Hons 2/1 in English Literature, then an MA in Medieval Literature and a PGCE. She worked as a teacher for several years as an assistant English teacher at Katherine Lady Berkeley Comprehensive in Wotton-under-Edge from 1979 to 1982, then Deputy Head of English at Harrogate Ladies' College from 1983 to 1988. She was a lecturer at North Thanet FIE College from 1992 to 1993, then an English teacher and Head of Year 8 at the Rochester Grammar School for Girls from 1993 until her election in 1997. From 1985 to 1987 she worked as an Examiner, Assessor, Moderator and Team Leader in English Literature for the Northern, Southern, London and Cambridge Examination Boards.

== Parliamentary career ==
Clark had previously stood unsuccessfully as the Labour candidate for Faversham in Kent in the 1992 general election. For the subsequent 1997 general election she was selected, from an all-women shortlist, as the Labour candidate for Peterborough in Cambridgeshire. She was elected to parliament with a majority of 7,323, defeating; two future Members of the European Parliament; Jacqueline Foster and David Howarth.

Whilst in Parliament, Clark had an interest in wildlife issues and was a leading Labour voice in opposition to violent animal rights protests. She was a member of the Environmental Audit Select Committee and Broadcasting Select Committees; completed the NCVO parliamentary scheme with secondments to ASBAH and MIND and founded the All Party Wildlife Group. The Bill committees she sat on included Finance Bill, Water Bill and Countryside & Rights of Way Bill.

Early on in her parliamentary career, Clark was considered loyal to her party leaders, but later opposed the Iraq War.

She was defeated for re-election in the 2005 general election by Conservative candidate Stewart Jackson. Three days after her defeat, she resigned from the Labour Party. In a letter to Labour Leader Tony Blair, she was critical of policies such as top-up fees and the Iraq War. Clark suggested that were Kenneth Clarke to win the Tory leadership she might be tempted to switch sides. However, it was subsequently reported she had not joined the Conservative Party, and did not intend to. She re-joined the Labour Party in 2010 and is a member of UNISON.

== After parliament ==
In April 2007, Clark was interviewed by The Observer. This was for an article about the female Labour MP's elected in the 1997 general election, known as Blair's Babes. She criticised the treatment of newly elected MPs by the Parliamentary Labour Party.

Since 2005 she has worked as Head of Policy & Campaigns for the Multiple Sclerosis Society; Interim Climate Change Advisor for the Association of British Insurers; Associate Consultant for the National Youth Agency and Assessor for the OCR examination board in addition to writing. Clark campaigns of availability of Alzheimers Drugs on the NHS. She is a member of the Chartered Institute of Assessors.

Clark was involved in an incident in 2008 when video footage of her complaining to bar staff about their refusal to serve her was posted on YouTube. After Clark threatened legal action over the availability of the video, she was charged with public order offences. Clark was found guilty of using threatening words and behaviour. However, the conviction was quashed upon appeal.

== Personal life ==
She married Alan Clark, a political journalist with Meridian television, in August 2001. Clark has two children from her previous marriage.

Parliament of the United Kingdom
Preceded by Brian Mawhinney	Member of Parliament for Peterborough; 1997–2005	Succeeded by Stewart Jackson
