= 2018 North Antrim recall petition =

UK Parliament recall petition

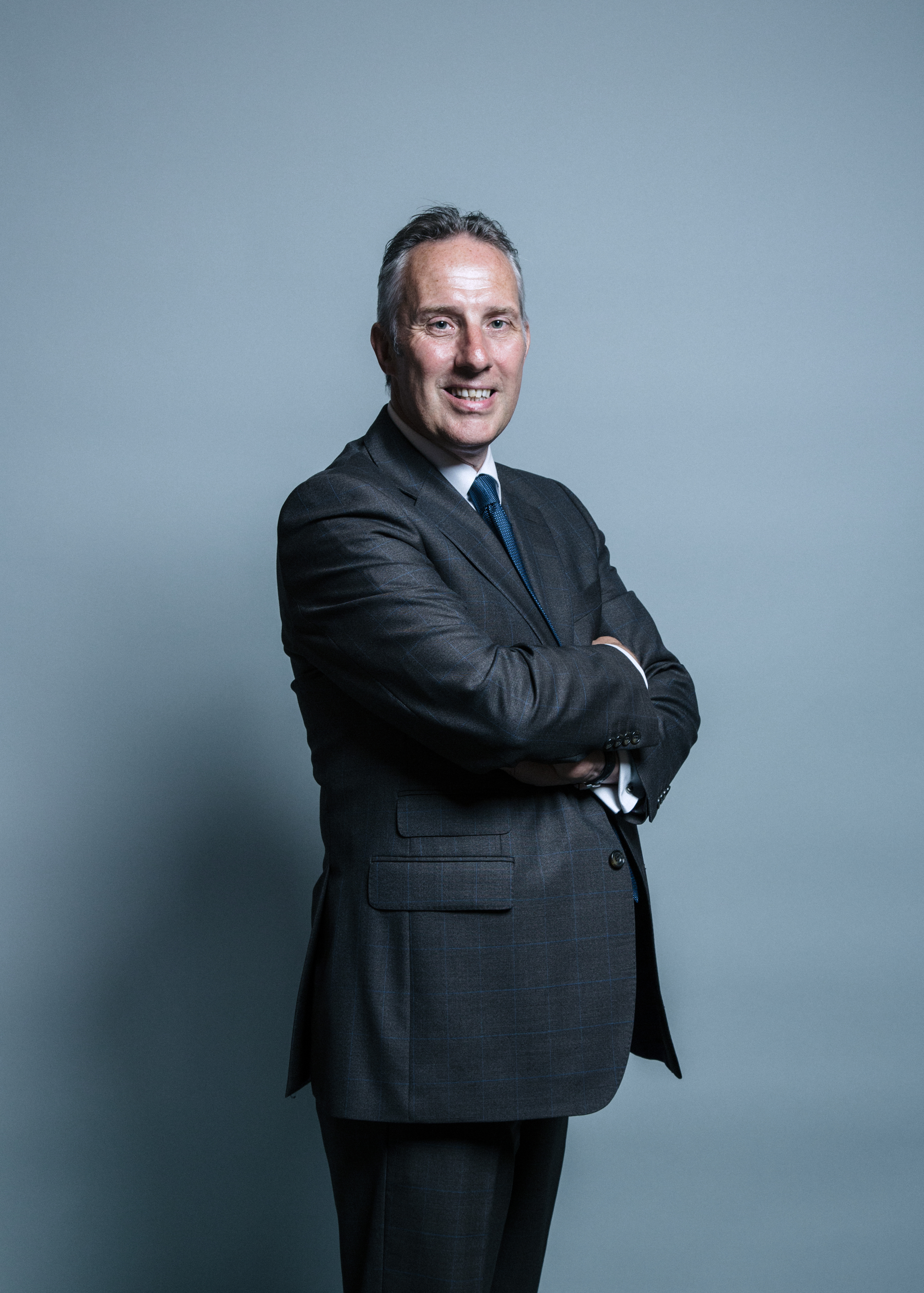
Official portrait of Ian Paisley

The North Antrim recall petition was a 2018 recall petition for the United Kingdom parliamentary constituency of North Antrim, in Northern Ireland, the first since the procedure was introduced by the Recall of MPs Act 2015. It was triggered when North Antrim's MP, Ian Paisley Jr, was suspended from the House of Commons for 30 days for advocating for Sri Lanka after failing to declare that its government had paid for his visits there. In the prescribed six-week period, 9.4% of the registered electorate signed the petition, short of the 10% required to unseat Paisley and force a by-election.

== Background ==
Paisley was first elected MP for North Antrim in the 2010 general election, retaining his seat in 2015 and 2017. In September 2017, The Daily Telegraph alleged that Paisley received hospitality from the government of Sri Lanka for two visits there in 2013 without declaring it, and pointed out that he had been involved in securing a post-Brexit trade deal with that country.

In July 2018, the Commons Select Committee on Standards recommended that Paisley be suspended from the Commons for 30 sitting days, for not declaring visits to Sri Lanka paid for by the Sri Lankan government, and for breaking the Commons rule banning paid advocacy. On 24 July 2018, MPs voted to suspend Paisley from the House of Commons for a period of 30 sitting days, beginning on 4 September 2018.

The Recall of MPs Act 2015 provides that a recall petition is automatically initiated by any of several events happening to an MP, one of which is suspension from the House of Commons for a period of more than 10 sitting days or 14 calendar days. Under the procedure, 10% of the constituency's electorate had to sign the petition to cause a by-election. Ian Paisley Jr would have been permitted to stand, and had indicated his intent to do so.

== Signing arrangements ==
The recall petition was the responsibility of the Electoral Office for Northern Ireland. It was available for signature to constituents on weekdays from 8 August to 19 September 2018 from 9am to 5pm, with opening hours extended to 9pm on 6 and 13 September, in three centres:

- Joey Dunlop Leisure Centre, Ballymoney
- Seven Towers Leisure Centre, Ballymena
- Sheskburn House Recreation Centre, Ballycastle.

Voters could also apply to sign by post on the same basis as postal voting.

The limitation to three venues, where up to ten are permitted by law, drew criticism from the Ulster Unionist Party and Sinn Féin.

== Result ==
2018 North Antrim recall petition 8 August – 19 September 2018
		%
Signatures	7,099	9.40%
Required number of signatures	7,543	10%
Unmarked or void signatures	14	n/a
Petition successful	No	n/a
Registered voters	75,428	100%

The result was confirmed in the early hours of Thursday 20 September, with 7,099 people (9.4% of the electorate) signing the petition, below the 10% required, which would have been 7,543.

Paisley retained his seat in the 2019 general election with 47.4% of the vote; he lost it in 2024 with 27.2%.

== See also ==
- List of United Kingdom by-elections (2010–present)
- 2019 Peterborough recall petition
- 2019 Brecon and Radnorshire recall petition
- 2023 Rutherglen and Hamilton West recall petition
