= Stewart Jackson =

British politician (born 1965)

The Right Honourable The Lord Jackson of Peterborough
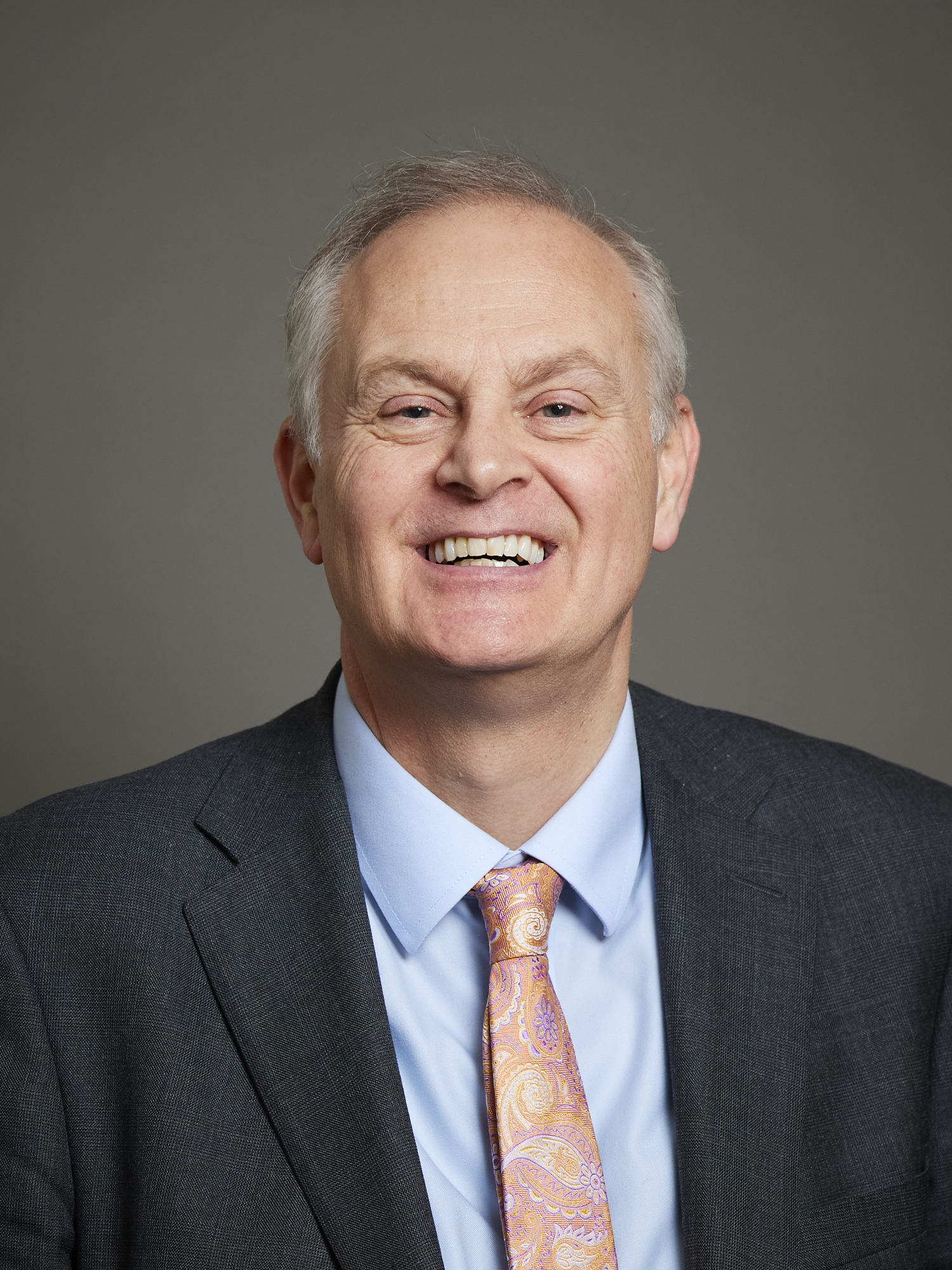

Special Adviser and chief of staff to the Secretary of State for Exiting the European Union
- In office 26 July 2017 – 9 July 2018
- Secretary: David Davis
- Preceded by: James Chapman
- Succeeded by: Nick de Bois

Parliamentary private secretary to the Secretary of State for Exiting the European Union
- In office 22 July 2016 – 8 June 2017
- Prime Minister: Theresa May
- Preceded by: Office established
- Succeeded by: Gareth Johnson

Member of the House of Lords
- Lord Temporal
- Life peerage 16 November 2022

Member of Parliament for Peterborough
- In office 5 May 2005 – 3 May 2017
- Preceded by: Helen Clark
- Succeeded by: Fiona Onasanya

Personal details
- Born: Stewart James Jackson; 31 January 1965 (age 61) Woolwich, London, UK
- Party: Conservative
- Spouse: Sarah O'Grady
- Children: Isabel Jackson
- Education: Royal Holloway, University of London; Thames Valley University
- Website: Official website

Stewart James Jackson, Baron Jackson of Peterborough (born 31 January 1965) is a British politician and adviser. Jackson served as a Conservative Member of Parliament (MP) for Peterborough from 2005 to 2017. After being ousted by Labour's Fiona Onasanya at the 2017 general election, he served as Chief of Staff, and Special Adviser to David Davis, Secretary of State for Exiting the European Union, until July 2018 when Davis resigned his position. He was made a member of the House of Lords as a life peer in November 2022.

== Early life ==
Jackson was born in Woolwich, London, England, and was brought up in south-east London. He was educated at the London Nautical School, an all-boys comprehensive school in Lambeth, and Chatham House Grammar School, an all boys grammar school in Ramsgate, Kent. He then studied economics and public administration at Royal Holloway, University of London, graduating with a Bachelor of Arts (BA) degree in 1988. He was elected president of the University of London Union for the 1988–89 academic year. During his tenure as president, he faced a no-confidence motion in January 1989, and resigned before he was required to leave office. He later undertook a Master of Arts (MA) degree in human resource management at Thames Valley University.

== Political career ==
Jackson served on Ealing Borough Council in west London from 1990 to 1998, during which time he was Conservative Party spokesman on planning and housing. He is vice-president of the Local Government Association.

Jackson unsuccessfully contested the parliamentary constituency of Brent South at the 1997 general election. He was then selected as the Conservative candidate for the Peterborough seat in October 2000, and fought the 2001 general election, where he reduced the Labour Party's majority in the constituency from 7,323 votes to 2,854 votes, but lost to the incumbent Labour MP Helen Brinton. Jackson was re-adopted as the Conservative candidate for Peterborough in August 2002, and defeated Brinton at the 2005 general election to become the MP.

In the 2010 general election, held on 6 May, Jackson increased his majority to 4,861 votes over the Labour candidate, Ed Murphy; he was appointed the following month as Parliamentary private secretary (PPS) to Owen Paterson, the Secretary of State for Northern Ireland, but resigned as PPS on 24 October 2011, after voting against a three-line whip on an EU referendum.

Following Theresa May's selection as the new Conservative Prime Minister, following David Cameron's resignation, Stewart Jackson was appointed as Parliamentary Private Secretary to David Davis, the Secretary of State for Exiting the European Union, in July 2016.

Following the loss of his seat at the 2017 general election, Jackson was appointed Special Advisor and Chief of Staff to the Secretary of State at the Department for Exiting the European Union. On 25 April 2022 Stewart Jackson was appointed to the role of High Speed 2 Residents' Commissioner.

It was announced on 14 October 2022, that as part of Boris Johnson's 2022 Political Honours, Jackson would be appointed a life peer. On 16 November 2022, Jackson was created Baron Jackson of Peterborough, of Peterborough in the County of Cambridgeshire.

=== Conservative Voice ===
Together with other MPs on the Conservative right wing, such as Nadine Dorries, Jackson assisted in establishing the Conservative Voice parliamentary grouping led by David Davis (David Cameron's principal opponent in the contest to win the leadership of the Conservative Party) and Liam Fox (former secretary of state for defence). In explaining his decision to join the new right-wing grouping, Jackson said that he hoped it could "get Cameron back on election-winning ground" and away from the "current social liberal mush". He stated that he would vote against the government's legislation to introduce same-sex marriage, and accused his party leader of being "arrogant" for pressing ahead with it.

== Policy positions ==
In 2013, he opposed David Cameron's plan to arm the Syrian rebels.

In 2014, Jackson, along with six other Conservative Party MPs, voted against the Equal Pay (Transparency) Bill, which would have required all companies with more than 250 employees to declare the gap in pay between the average male and average female salaries.

Jackson opposed the 2013 bill to allow gay marriage. In March 2015, he told a lesbian constituent: "The feeling's fully mutual. Please feel free to never bother me again" after she requested to be removed from his campaign mailing list because she disagreed with his position on the act.

== Use of social media ==
In March 2015, Jackson attracted media attention for his response to a constituent which was subsequently circulated on social media. Jackson's email told the constituent "The feeling's fully mutual. Please feel free to never bother me again" after she requested to be removed from his campaign mailing list because she disagreed with his opposition to the Marriage (Same Sex Couples) Act 2013.

On 26 June 2016, Rupert Myers, a political correspondent for The Times, tweeted about the outcome of the Referendum of the United Kingdom's membership of the European Union "I can't get over the fact that the winning side lied about a whole bunch of stuff & yet expect us to live cheerfully with the result". Stewart Jackson replied from his verified Twitter account "Suck it up whiner...".

Jackson attracted attention in October 2016, when he used Twitter to state that patriots should not subscribe to The Economist, a liberal, free-market magazine, because of its arguments about the problems leaving the EU would entail.

After losing his seat in 2017, Jackson contacted a former constituent who had been critical of him on Facebook to call him a "thick chav", and also wrote: "If you print any shit about me on Facebook in the future you will regret it."

In October 2018, Jackson, who is known for his pro-Brexit views, was again criticised after tweeting: "What a pathetic cretin" in response to a picture of an ill child with a duvet depicting the European Union flag. The child was recovering from an operation at the Great Ormond Street Hospital. Jackson subsequently said, after deleting the initial tweet, that he was referring to the child's stepfather rather than the child himself. The Science Minister, Sam Gyimah, criticised the tweet, saying: "No one can take credibly or seriously people who use that language." Heidi Allen, another Conservative MP, responded by describing Jackson as "a pathetic, unkind and nasty man."

== Attempts at a political comeback ==
Since losing his seat in 2017, Jackson has made several attempts at a political comeback, though has failed to be selected multiple times.

Ahead of the 2019 General Election, he attempted to be selected for the safe seat of Sevenoaks in Kent, losing to Laura Trott.

In 2020, he stood to be the Conservative candidate for Cambridgeshire Police and Crime Commissioner, losing to eventual winner Daryll Preston. He lost the selection by a margin of two votes despite the endorsement of Home Secretary Priti Patel.

== Parliamentary expenses scandal ==
On 12 May 2009, both BBC Newsnight, and a second article published by The Daily Telegraph reported that Jackson had claimed £55,000 on housing costs for the constituency house, bringing the total sum to over £66,000. When asked about how MPs should be housed in their constituencies, Jackson was quoted in The Daily Telegraph as saying that any ban on the second home allowance would be "draconian and unfair".

In May 2013, the Independent Parliamentary Standards Authority (IPSA) issued a High Court action in an attempt to recover £54,000 in alleged notional Capital Gains arising from Jackson's Peterborough home.

=== Wikipedia biography ===
IP addresses from inside the Houses of Parliament have often edited the Wikipedia biographies of politicians including Jackson in an attempt to remove details on the parliamentary expenses scandal, and attempts have been made to remove details of Jackson's interaction with a lesbian constituent. Ben Riley-Smith, a correspondent for The Daily Telegraph, argues that it is impossible to prove that changes are made by staff of any particular MP.

== Citizen's arrest attempt ==
In July 2012, Jackson attempted to tackle a vandal in Peterborough. Jackson, who was shopping with his wife and daughter, tried to perform a citizen's arrest after seeing a bus shelter being vandalised. The vandal got away, but only after kicking the MP. Cambridgeshire Constabulary subsequently arrested a twenty-year-old man in connection with the incident who was later found guilty of assault and criminal damage at Peterborough Magistrates Court.

Parliament of the United Kingdom
Preceded by Helen Clark	Member of Parliament for Peterborough; 2005–2017	Succeeded by Fiona Onasanya
Orders of precedence in the United Kingdom
Preceded by The Lord Weir of Ballyholme	Gentlemen; Baron Jackson of Peterborough	Followed by The Lord Hendy of Richmond Hill
