= Lisa Forbes (politician) =

British Labour politician

Member of Parliament for Peterborough
- In office 6 June 2019 – 6 November 2019
- Preceded by: Fiona Onasanya
- Succeeded by: Paul Bristow

Personal details
- Born: Lisa Jane Forbes; 28 July 1969 (age 56)
- Party: Labour
- Children: 4

Lisa Jane Forbes (born 28 July 1969) is a British Labour Party politician who served as Member of Parliament (MP) for Peterborough from June to November 2019.

== Early career ==
Forbes, who is a member of GMB, was an official in Unite the Union. She has worked for Thomas Cook.

== Early political career ==
Forbes was elected as a Labour councillor for Orton Longueville ward on Peterborough City Council in 2012, standing down in 2016 to focus on her parliamentary candidacy.

She was the Labour candidate for Peterborough at the 2015 General Election, reducing the Conservative majority by over half, but chose not to stand in the 2017 election at which Fiona Onasanya won the seat for Labour. After Onasanya's removal by means of a recall petition, Forbes was selected to contest the seat again in the ensuing by-election.

== Parliamentary career ==
Forbes was elected MP for Peterborough at the by-election on 6 June 2019 with a majority of 683 over the Brexit Party candidate Mike Greene, who had been expected to win. She ran in the by-election on a platform of seeking to invest more into local schools, revitalise the local police force and combat illegal dumping. Jewish groups called on Labour to disown her for having commented on a Facebook thread and also a video containing anti-Israel and allegedly antisemitic remarks: Forbes said she had not noticed the phrases. After she was elected, Jeremy Corbyn said she was "not a racist in any way", while she arranged to meet Jewish groups.

During her brief time in Parliament she unsuccessfully called for a government bailout for Thomas Cook Group, which employed 1000 people at their head office in her constituency and campaigned for there to be statutory guidance on school uniform costs.

Forbes stood for re-election at the 2019 general election but lost to Conservative candidate Paul Bristow by a margin of 2,580 votes.

== Personal life ==
Forbes has lived in the Peterborough constituency for 30 years. She has four children.

== See also ==
- List of United Kingdom MPs with the shortest service

Parliament of the United Kingdom
Preceded by Fiona Onasanya	Member of Parliament for Peterborough; June 2019–November 2019	Succeeded by Paul Bristow
