= Jessops =

British photographic retailing company

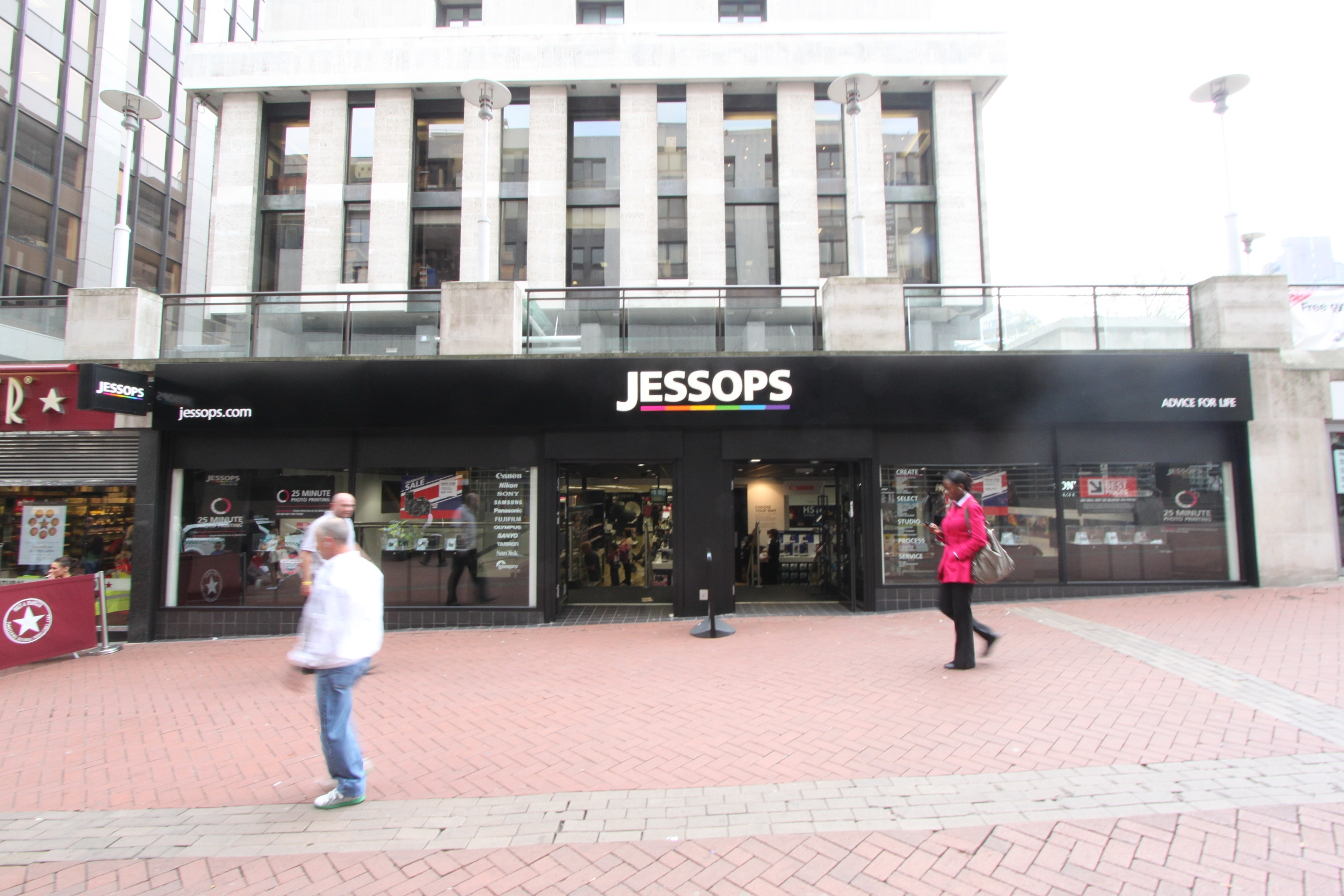
- Jessops reopened store, in Birmingham (2011)
- Type: Private limited company
- Industry: Retail
- Founded: Leicester, United Kingdom (1935)
- Founder: Frank Jessop
- Headquarters: Marlow, United Kingdom
- Number of locations: 7 (2026)
- Area served: United Kingdom
- Products: Photographic equipment Photograph processing
- Revenue: £236.8 million (2011)
- Operating income: £5.7 million (2011)
- Owner: AO World
- Website: www.jessops.com

Jessops is a British photographic retailer, originally known as Jessop of Leicester. It was established in 1935 by Frank Jessop in Leicester, United Kingdom. The business now comprises Jessops (Group) Limited, which controls Jessops Europe Limited, which in turn controls JR Prop Limited, formerly known as Jessops Retail Limited.

At the end of the 2000s, the business struggled with insolvency, and entered administration in January 2013. The company was rescued by PJ Investment Group, founded by entrepreneur Peter Jones CBE who bought the assets, and formed Jessops (Group) Limited, and related companies.

In September 2026, it was sold to AO World.

== History ==
=== Early years to 1990s ===
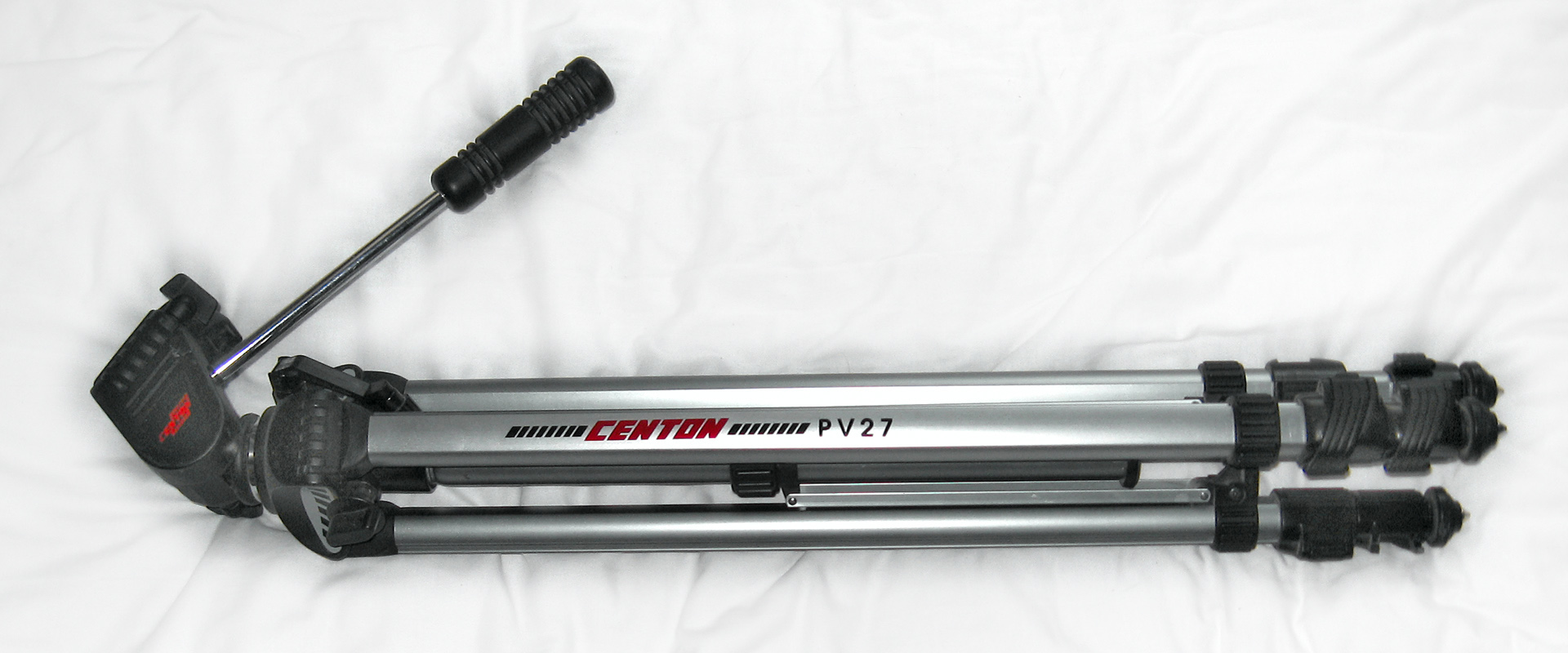
A Centon (own-brand) tripod purchased from Jessops in the mid-1990s

Frank Jessop founded Jessop of Leicester in 1935, as a specialist photographic retailer. The company expanded to major towns and cities.

Jessop later used the Centon name as an own brand for a range of photographic and related goods sold through its shops.

=== Sale of company and following years (1996–2007) ===
In July 1996, Alan Jessop, the son of founder Frank Jessop, sold the firm in a management buyout to Bridgepoint Capital.

Bridgepoint Capital attempted to float Jessops on the London Stock Exchange in September 2000, but abandoned plans the following month. This was because it was told the firm would list with a market value of £90 million to £100 million. The two hundredth store, Durham, opened in July 2001, which has since closed down. Jessops once again abandoned plans to float, in April 2002.

ABN Amro paid £116 million for the company, in September 2002. The sale was completed the next month. ABN Amro applied to float on the London Stock Exchange in October 2004, which successfully occurred the next month. In May 2004, the main warehouse relocated to Weedon Bec, Northamptonshire, as the warehouse in Leicester was considered too small. This resulted in most of the staff being made redundant.

=== Financial problems (2007–2013) ===
The company suffered financial difficulties by June 2007, requiring the strategic review, and eventually leading to a re financing with its bankers, HSBC, in September 2009. This led to the group's trade being transferred to a new holding company, Snap Equity Limited, whilst Jessops plc was placed in liquidation and the group's final salary pension scheme transferred to the Pension Protection Fund.

Snap Equity was formed as a private company, 48% owned by HSBC, 33% by pension trustees, and 20% by an employee trust. On 21 June 2007, Jessops announced the closure of 81 of its then 315 stores, as "part of a strategic review, which aimed to save the Leicester firm £15m". HSBC acquired the company circa September 2009, in a "debt for equity" deal. The Financial Times commented that the company was hurt by the increasing quality of mobile phone cameras, reducing demand for traditional cameras.

On 9 January 2013, Jessops went into administration, with an application made to the High Court. On 11 January, it was announced that all 187 stores would close, with the loss of 1,370 jobs. Shoppers who put up to £500 on a gift card, found them useless, and the company ceased to accept customer returns, although manufacturers' warranties on products not branded by Jessops, were not affected.

On 31 January 2013, however, the brand of Jessops, and various assets, were acquired by PJ Investment Group owned by entrepreneur, Peter Jones, one of the investors from the television programme, Dragons' Den. Various new companies were incorporated including Jessops (Group) Limited, Jessops Europe Limited and Jessops Retail Limited. Jones also incorporated Jessops Online Limited, at the same time.

On 3 February, the supermarket retailer, Morrisons, agreed to purchase seven of Jessops larger store sites, from the administrators, for an undisclosed price, to be converted to the convenience store format by Morrisons, M Local.

=== Reopening (2013–2019) ===
On 28 March 2013, six stores reopened, and Jessops aimed to open a new store every day on average during April 2013. One of the six opened on the 28 March, the store in Oxford Street in London, received considerable media interest, and was attended by several celebrities, including the actor James Corden. Another store in London, Birmingham, Manchester, Aberdeen and High Wycombe were the other five.

St Albans opened on the 29 March. Several other stores reopened throughout April. All the new stores contained a mini labs, offering same day processing of photographic film. The company had reopened twenty eight stores across the United Kingdom, by September 2013. Jessops signed a landmark deal with Sainsbury's in July 2014, to start opening Jessops branches in its larger stores, the first of which opened in October 2014. There were fifty two stores of Jessops, by April 2016.

=== Financial difficulties (2019–present) ===
ReSolve were appointed as administrators for JR Prop Limited, in December 2019. This company holds property leases and employs retail staff, the main trading company, Jessops Europe Limited, was not affected.

On the 26 March 2021, Jessops went into administration for the third time in eight years, and announced that were considering a company voluntary arrangement (CVA) which would allow it to survive. PJ Investment Group is offering to provide additional financial support if management can come up with a sustainable business plan. On 27 August 2021 Jessops successfully secured 100% approval of the CVA and PJ Investment Group invested several million pounds into the business in order to provide sufficient capital to grow the business.

In the year to 1 October 2023, the company reported revenues of £19.97 million, a decrease of 7.5 per cent on the previous year leading to a £1.2 million loss.

In July 2024, HM Revenue and Customs issued the company a winding-up petition due to its outstanding tax liability; the petition was withdrawn shortly afterwards.
