= Orme (surname) =

Orme is a surname, and may refer to:

- Albert Orme (1937–2008), New Zealand lawyer, politician and rugby player
- Alexander Orme (1813–1896), Church of Ireland priest
- Annabelle Orme (born 1987), American synchronized swimmer
- Charles Orme (1918–2007), British film producer
- Christine Orme, American physicist
- Clarence Orme (1899–1968), American baseball player
- Daniel Orme (1766–1837), English artist and publisher
- David Orme, English writer and poet
- David Orme-Johnson (born 1941), American psychologist
- Denise Orme (1885–1960), English music hall singer
- Dennis Orme (born 1938), leader of the Unification Church in England
- Edward Orme (1775–1848), British engraver, publisher and property developer
- Eliza Orme (1848–1937), first woman to earn a law degree in England
- Emily Rosaline Orme (1835–1915), Scottish suffragist
- Fern Hubbard Orme (1903–1993), American politician and educator
- Garton Orme (c.1696–1758), British politician
- Geoffrey Orme (1904–1978), British screenwriter
- Gregory K. Orme (born 1953), American judge
- George Orme (1891–1962), American baseball player
- Harry Orme (1826–1864), English bare-knuckle boxer
- Humphrey Orme (1620–1671), English politician
- Ian Orme (1952–2018), American microbiologist
- Joseph Orme (1884–1935), English football goalkeeper
- Kate Orme (born 1989), Australian rules footballer
- Nicholas Orme (born 1942), British historian
- Philibert de l'Orme (c. 1510–1570), French Renaissance architect
- Robert Orme (1728–1801), British military historian
- Robert Orme (British Army officer) (c.1725–1781/1790), British Army officer
- Stan Orme (1923–2005), British Labour Party politician
- Thomas Orme (c.1637–1716), English politician
- William Orme (minister) (1787–1830), Scottish Congregational minister and biographer
- William W. Orme (1832–1866), American soldier and lawyer

== See also ==
- Orne (surname)
