= William FitzWilliam =

William FitzWilliam or Fitzwilliam may refer to:

- William Fitzwilliam (Sheriff of London) (c. 1460–1534), protégé of Cardinal Wolsey
- William FitzWilliam, 1st Earl of Southampton (c. 1490–1542), English courtier
- William Fitzwilliam (Dean of Wells)
- William Fitzwilliam (died 1559) (1506–1559), MP
- William FitzWilliam (Lord Deputy) (1526–1599), Lord Deputy of Ireland
- William FitzWilliam, 2nd Baron FitzWilliam (1609–1658), English politician
- William FitzWilliam, 3rd Viscount FitzWilliam (c. 1610–1670), Irish nobleman
- William Fitzwilliam, 3rd Earl Fitzwilliam (1719–1756), British peer
- William Fitzwilliam, 4th Earl Fitzwilliam (1748–1833), British Whig statesman
- William Wentworth-Fitzwilliam, 6th Earl Fitzwilliam (1815–1902), British peer and Liberal politician
- William Wentworth-Fitzwilliam, 7th Earl Fitzwilliam (1872–1943), British Army officer, politician and aristocrat
- William Fitzwilliam, 1st Earl Fitzwilliam (1643–1719), English nobleman, politician, and peer
- William Fitzwilliam, Viscount Milton (d. 1835), British Member of Parliament for Malton

== See also ==
- Earl Fitzwilliam, many who were named William FitzWilliam
