= Peterborough by-election =

Peterborough by-election may refer to:

- 1878 Peterborough by-election
- 1943 Peterborough by-election
- 2019 Peterborough by-election
