= William Fitzwilliam, 1st Earl Fitzwilliam =

English nobleman, Whig politician and peer

The Right Honourable The Earl FitzWilliam MP
- Born: 29 April 1643
- Died: 28 December 1719 (aged 76)
- Title: 1st Earl Fitzwilliam
- Spouse: Anne Cremor
- Children: John Fitzwilliam, 2nd Earl Fitzwilliam
- Parent(s): William FitzWilliam, 2nd Baron FitzWilliam; Jane Perry

William Fitzwilliam, 1st Earl Fitzwilliam MP (29 April 1643 – 28 December 1719) was an English nobleman, Whig politician, and peer.

Fitzwilliam was the son of William FitzWilliam, 2nd Baron FitzWilliam and Jane Perry. On 21 February 1658, he succeeded to his father's title. As his title was in the Peerage of Ireland, Fitzwilliam was able to sit in the House of Commons of England, and served as the Member of Parliament for Peterborough from 1667 to 1679. He sat again for the seat in 1681. On 21 July 1716, he was made Viscount Milton and Earl Fitzwilliam, both titles in the Peerage of Ireland.

On 10 May 1669, he married Anne Cremor, daughter and sole heiress of Edmund Cremor and Anne Tryce. He was succeeded in his titles by his eldest son, John Fitzwilliam.

Parliament of England
Preceded by Humphrey Orme; Edward Palmer	Member of Parliament for Peterborough; 1667 – 1679; With: Humphrey Orme; Sir Vere Fane; Francis St John	Succeeded by Francis St John; Charles Orme
Preceded by Francis St John; Charles Orme	Member of Parliament for Peterborough; 1681; With: Francis St John	Succeeded by Charles FitzWilliam; Charles Orme
Peerage of Ireland
New creation	Earl Fitzwilliam; 1716–1719	Succeeded by John Fitzwilliam
Preceded by William Fitzwilliam	Baron Fitzwilliam; 1658–1719	Succeeded by John Fitzwilliam
