= Peterborough (constituency) =

Parliamentary constituency in the United Kingdom, 1801 onwards

Coordinates: 52°35′N 0°15′W

- Borough constituency for the House of Commons
- Interactive map of boundaries since 2024
- Location within the East of England
- County: Cambridgeshire
- Electorate: 72,273 (March 2020)

Current constituency
- Created: 1974
- Member of Parliament: Andrew Pakes (Labour)
- Seats: One

1918–1974
- Seats: One
- Type of constituency: County constituency

1541–1918
- Seats: 1541–1885: Two; 1885–1918: One
- Type of constituency: Borough constituency

Peterborough is a borough constituency represented in the House of Commons of the Parliament of the United Kingdom since July 2024 by Andrew Pakes of the Labour Party.

Its current form is the direct, unbroken successor of a smaller constituency that was created in the mid-16th century returning two Members of Parliament (MPs) using the bloc vote system of election and represented in the House of Commons of England until 1707, then in the House of Commons of Great Britain from 1707 to 1800, and then in the House of Commons of the United Kingdom from 1801 to 1885. From 1885 onwards, the seat has elected one MP using the first-past-the-post system.

== Constituency profile ==
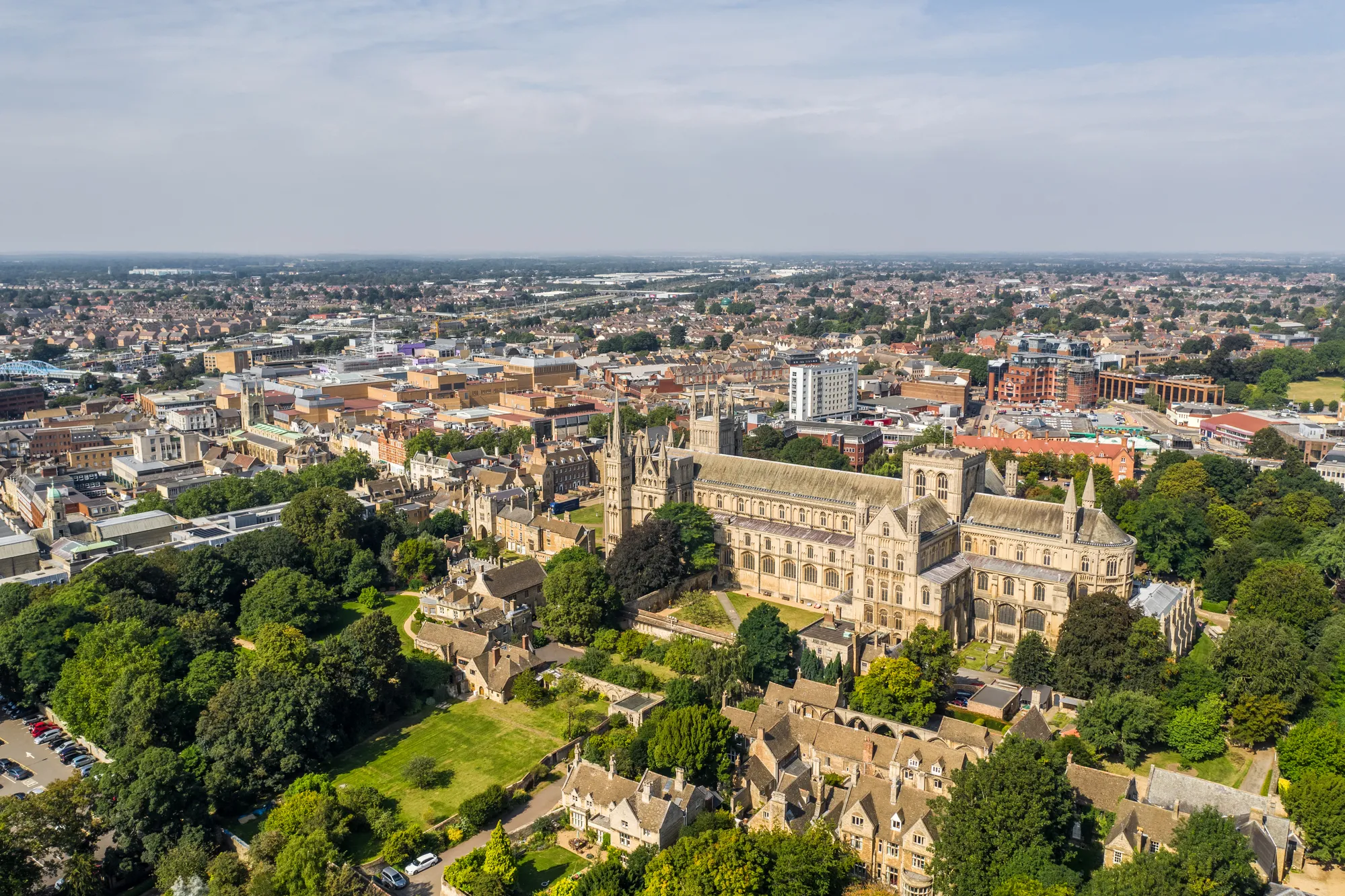
Peterborough's skyline with Peterborough Cathedral in the foreground

Peterborough is a constituency in Cambridgeshire in the East of England. It covers the northern half of the city of Peterborough, that being the area north of the River Nene, which includes the city centre and the suburbs of Eastgate, Bretton, Ravensthorpe, Longthorpe, Dogsthorpe, Gunthorpe, Paston, Parnwell and Werrington. The constituency also includes the rural villages of Newborough, Eye and Thorney to the east of the city.

Peterborough is a historic cathedral city that was an important national centre for the brickmaking industry during the 20th century. The city was designated a new town in 1967 leading to large-scale suburban development outside of the historic centre. The outer, more recently developed suburbs of Longthorpe and Werrington are mostly affluent, however the rest of the city is highly-deprived. The neighbourhoods immediately north of the city centre feature dense terraced housing and some suburbs like Eastgate, Ravensthorpe and Paston contain a large quantity of low-income council housing. House prices across the constituency are considerably lower than the regional and UK averages.

This constituency has an above-average population of middle-aged adults and a low proportion of retirees. Residents have low levels of income and homeownership and the child poverty rate is high. They have low levels of education and a high proportion work in the health, retail and business administration sectors. The percentage of residents claiming unemployment benefits is high. White people made up 70% of the population at the 2021 census, around a quarter of whom were of non-British origin, including large Polish and Lithuanian communities. Asians, mostly of Pakistani origin, made up 20% of residents.

At the local council level, the centre and east of the city are represented by Labour Party councillors whilst the western and northern suburbs elected mostly Conservatives and Liberal Democrats. Voters in Peterborough strongly supported leaving the European Union in the 2016 referendum; an estimated 62% voted in favour of Brexit compared to the UK-wide figure of 52%.

== Boundaries and boundary changes ==
=== Historic ===
==== Prior to 1918 ====
The earliest known members representing Peterborough were in 1547, shortly after it had gained city status, when Peterborough Cathedral became the seat of the new diocese of Peterborough in 1541. The cathedral had been Peterborough Abbey until the dissolution of the monasteries abolished it in 1539. The new city was not an ancient borough, nor a municipal borough until 1876; no charter survives granting the status of city or the right to Parliamentary representation or delimiting its boundary for electoral purposes.

The centre of the city was an extra-parochial area called the "Minster Precincts" comprising the cathedral close. The commissioners appointed prior to the parallel Great Reform Act 1832 and reported that Peterborough's parliamentary boundary, as far as was then known, comprised the Minster Precincts and the south-eastern part of the surrounding parish of Saint John the Baptist, excluding the parish's northern and western townships of Longthorpe, Dogsthorpe (or Dodsthorpe) and Newark-with-Eastfield. The borough franchise was scot and lot in the parish and householder in the Minster Precincts. For parliamentary purposes, the rest of the Soke of Peterborough, north and west of the city, was in the county constituency of Northamptonshire; the area south of the River Nene was in Huntingdonshire; to the east, Thorney was in Cambridgeshire.

The 1832 acts extended the parliamentary borough of Peterborough to the entire parish of Saint John the Baptist (adding 48 qualifying properties) and retained its two members. (The rural portion of the Soke was included in the Northern division of Northamptonshire.) Under the Boundary Act 1868, the area of New Fletton and Woodstone (south of the River Nene) was transferred from Huntingdonshire. Under the Redistribution of Seats Act 1885, the borough's representation was reduced from two MPs to one.

==== 1918–1950 ====
- The administrative county of the Soke of Peterborough (the Municipal Borough of Peterborough and the Rural Districts of Barnack and Peterborough);
- The Urban District of Oundle;
- The Rural Districts of Easton-on-the-Hill and Gretton; and
- Parts of the Rural Districts of Oundle and Thrapston

In 1918 the parliamentary borough was abolished and replaced with a new division of the parliamentary county of Northampton with the Soke of Peterborough, including the whole of the Soke (which had been created as a separate administrative county by the Local Government Act 1888) and neighbouring parts of the administrative county of Northamptonshire, absorbing the bulk of the abolished Northern division, incorporating Oundle and extending down to and beyond Thrapston and Corby.

==== 1950–1974 ====
- The Municipal Borough of Peterborough;
- The Urban District of Oundle;
- The Rural Districts of Barnack and Peterborough; and
- Part of the Rural District of Oundle and Thrapston

Designated as a county constituency under the revisions brought in for the 1950 general election by the Representation of the People Act 1948, with only minor changes to the boundaries of the constituency to reflect a rationalisation of the rural districts of Northamptonshire.

==== 1974–1983 ====
- The Municipal Borough of Peterborough; and
- The Rural Districts of Barnack, Peterborough and Thorney

In 1965 the administrative counties of the Soke of Peterborough and Huntingdonshire were combined to form Huntingdon and Peterborough. At the next redistribution, which came into effect for the February 1974 general election, the constituency was redesignated as a Borough Constituency, composing the local authorities which had comprised the Soke, together with the sparsely populated Rural District of Thorney, which was transferred from the administrative county/constituency of Isle of Ely. The parts in Northamptonshire were transferred to Wellingborough.

==== 1983–1997 ====
- The City of Peterborough wards of Bretton, Central, Dogsthorpe, East, Fletton, North, Orton Longueville, Orton Waterville, Park, Paston, Ravensthorpe, Stanground, Walton and West

As a result of the Local Government Act 1972, the two counties of Huntingdon and Peterborough and Cambridgeshire and Isle of Ely were merged to form the non-metropolitan county of Cambridgeshire, with effect from 1 April 1974. However, the next redistribution did not come into effect until the 1983 general election, when areas to the south of the River Nene, including Fletton and the Ortons, which were now part of the expanded City of Peterborough, were transferred from the abolished constituency of Huntingdonshire. Mainly rural areas to the east (Thorney and Eye) and west (Barnack and Werrington) were transferred to the new constituencies of North East Cambridgeshire and Huntingdon respectively.

==== 1997–2010 ====
- The City of Peterborough wards of Bretton, Central, Dogsthorpe, East, North, Park, Paston, Ravensthorpe, Walton, Werrington and West

The next redistribution, which came into effect for the 1997 general election, saw the creation of North West Cambridgeshire, which took the areas to the south of the River Nene (City of Peterborough wards of Fletton, Orton Longueville, Orton Waterville and Stanground). Werrington was transferred back from Huntingdon.

==== 2010–2024 ====
Map of boundaries 2010–2024

- The City of Peterborough wards of Bretton North, Bretton South, Central, Dogsthorpe, East, Eye and Thorney, Newborough, North, Park, Paston, Ravensthorpe, Walton, Werrington North, Werrington South and West

Following their review of parliamentary representation in Cambridgeshire which came into effect for the 2010 general election, the Boundary Commission for England made minor alterations to the existing constituencies to deal with population changes, primarily the transfer back of Thorney and Eye from North East Cambridgeshire. There were also marginal changes to take account of the redistribution of City of Peterborough wards. These changes increased the electorate from 64,893 to 70,640. On the enumeration date of 17 February 2000, the electoral quota for England was 69,934 voters per constituency.

=== Current ===
Further to the 2023 review of Westminster constituencies, which came into effect for the 2024 general election, the composition of the constituency is as follows (as they existed on 1 December 2020):

- The City of Peterborough wards of: Bretton; Central; Dogsthorpe; East; Eye, Thorney & Newborough; Gunthorpe; North; Park; Paston & Walton; Ravensthorpe; Werrington; West.

Marginal loss due to further ward boundary changes.

The current constituency is composed of built-up areas of Peterborough to the north of the River Nene, as well as rural areas to the east and north and comprises approximately 60% of the electorate of the local authority of the City of Peterborough. Remaining parts of the city, composed of residential areas to the south of the River Nene and rural areas to the west of Peterborough form part of the North West Cambridgeshire constituency.

== Franchise ==
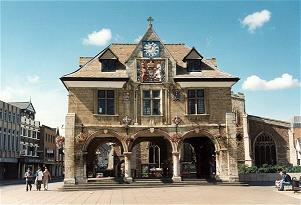
The Guildhall, Cathedral Square (1669–1671), site of the former Market Place.

In the unreformed House of Commons the franchise for borough seats varied enormously. Originally the Dean of Peterborough and Cathedral Chapter had claimed the franchise and held that only residents of Minster Precincts were burgesses and so entitled to vote. By the interregnum, the city was one of 37 boroughs in which suffrage was restricted to those paying scot and lot, a form of municipal taxation. In 1800 there were 2,000 registered voters in Northamptonshire and 400 in Peterborough. By 1835 this was 576, or about one per cent of the population. Bribery was general until the introduction of the secret ballot under the Ballot Act 1872. Votes were cast by spoken declaration, in public, at the hustings, erected on the Market Place (now Cathedral Square).

The Great Reform Act 1832 enfranchised those who owned or leased land worth £10 or more and the Second Reform Act extended this to all householders paying £10 or more in rent per annum, effectively enfranchising the skilled working class, so by 1868 the percentage of voters in Peterborough had risen to about 20% of the population. The Third Reform Act extended the provisions of the previous act to the counties and the Fourth Reform Act widened suffrage further by abolishing practically all property qualifications for men and by enfranchising women over 30 who met minimum property qualifications. This system, known as universal manhood suffrage, was first used in the 1918 general election. However, full electoral equality would not occur until the Fifth Reform Act ten years later.

According to the 2001 census, the population count of Peterborough constituency is 95,103 persons, comprising 46,131 males and 48,972 females. 67.56% of those aged 16–74 are economically active, including 5.92% unemployed; a further 12.26% are retired and 3.08% students. Of a total 39,760 households, 63.80% are owner occupied, fewer than the regional (72.71%) and national (68.72%) averages. Turnout at the 2005 general election was 41,194 or 61.0% of those eligible to vote, below the regional (63.6%) and national (61.3%) figures.

== Members of Parliament ==
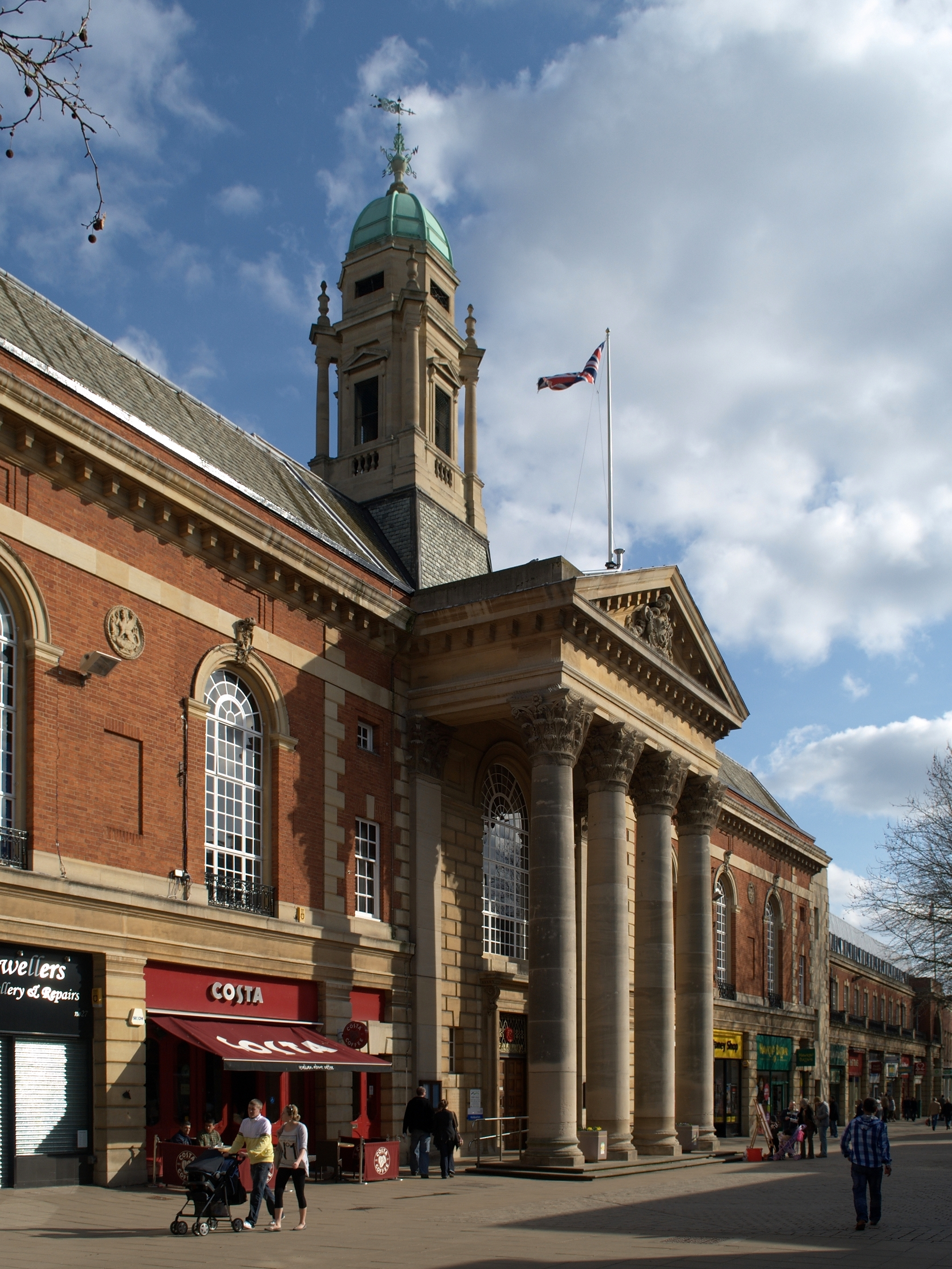
The Town Hall, Upper Bridge Street (1930–1933), formerly Narrow Street.

Peterborough sent two members to parliament for the first time in 1547. Before the civil war, many were relatives of the clergy; then for two hundred years after the restoration there was always a Fitzwilliam, or a Fitzwilliam nominee, sitting as member for Peterborough, making it a Whig stronghold. Representation was reduced to one member under the Redistribution of Seats Act 1885.

One of the earliest incumbents, Sir Walter Mildmay, member for Peterborough from 1553 to 1554, subsequently became Chancellor of the Exchequer from 1559 to 1589. Later, in the nineteenth century, William Elliot, Whig member from 1802 until his death in 1819, was Chief Secretary to the Lord Lieutenant of Ireland between 1806 and 1807; the Hon. William Lamb (later the 2nd Viscount Melbourne), Whig member from 1816 to 1819, became Home Secretary in 1830 then Prime Minister from 1834 to 1841; and Sir James Scarlett (later the 1st Baron Abinger), Whig member from 1819 to 1830, was, from 1827, Attorney General for England and Wales.

From the formal merger of the breakaway Liberal Unionists with the Conservatives in 1912 and the absorption of rural North Northamptonshire in 1918, Peterborough has been predominantly Conservative; however, it has elected Labour MPs several times from 1929 onwards.

Lord Burghley, as he then was, succeeded the socialist writer and illustrator, Frank Horrabin, who was born in the city and elected under the leadership of Ramsay MacDonald in 1929. David Cecil, 6th Marquess of Exeter, winner of 400m hurdles at the 1928 Summer Olympics, member of the International Olympic Committee for 48 years and chairman of the organising committee of the 1948 Summer Olympics, was the Conservative member from 1931 to 1943.

In 1966, in one of the closest polls in UK history, Sir Harmar Nicholls held the seat by three votes after seven recounts. Nicholls was the Conservative member from 1950 to 1974, when he lost in the October election of that year to Labour's Michael Ward, having held on by just 22 votes after four recounts in the election eight months earlier. The growth in the New Town from 1967 may in part account for Labour's victory here in 1974. In 1979, however, Ward lost the seat to the Conservative Brian Mawhinney, who would represent Peterborough for the entire duration of the incoming Conservative government and was a Cabinet Minister and Chairman of the Conservative Party during the second Major government (1992–97).

The seat was made more competitive in the 1997 boundary review by the formation of the North West Cambridgeshire seat, which incorporated the rural land outside Peterborough and several Conservative-inclined wards from the city. Since its formation, North West Cambridgeshire has been one of the safest Conservative seats in the country, whilst Peterborough was ranked 93rd in the Conservatives's one hundred most vulnerable seats (the ones which the other parties must take if there is to be a change of government) and 73rd on Labour's target list; these factors led Mawhinney to stand in North West Cambridgeshire instead. He retired as an MP in 2005 and was created Baron Mawhinney, of Peterborough in the county of Cambridgeshire.

Helen Clark (née Brinton) won the seat for Labour in 1997. She was defeated by Conservative candidate Stewart Jackson at the 2005 election, following which it was widely reported that Clark was planning to defect to the Conservative Party, an announcement which was not popular locally. However, by early June it emerged that while she had left the Labour Party, she had not in fact joined the Conservatives and did not intend to.

Jackson was re-elected in 2010 with an increased majority, which then fell in 2015. In 2017, Labour's Fiona Onasanya won a majority of 607; this result marked the first time since 1929 that Peterborough voted Labour in an election where the Conservatives won the national popular vote, and the first time it has ever elected a Labour MP in a year in which Labour did not form the government. Furthermore, Peterborough became one of five constituencies – the others being Croydon Central, Enfield Southgate, Leeds North West and Reading East – which elected Labour MPs in 2017 having not done so since 2001.

=== Parliamentary borough 1547–1918 ===
==== MPs 1542–1660 ====
Election	Senior member	Junior member
1542	Sir Thomas Moyle	
1547	Sir Wymond Carew, died and replaced in 1552 by John Campanett	Richard Pallady
March 1553	Not known	Not known
Oct. 1553	Sir Walter Mildmay	Sir William FitzWilliam
April 1554	John Gamlin (Gamblin, Gamlyn)	Giles Isham
Nov. 1554	William Liveley	Gilbert Bull
1555	Maurice Tyrell	John Mountsteven
1558	Giles Isham	Thomas Hussey
1559	Sir William FitzWilliam	Robert Wingfield Jr.
1562	John FitzWilliam	Robert Wingfield Jr.
1571	William Fitzwilliam	Henry Cheke, sat for Bedford and replaced by Brian Ansley
1572	Robert Wingfield Jr., died and replaced in 1581 by Sir William FitzWilliam	Hugh FitzWilliam died and replaced 1576 by Humphrey Mildmay
1584	William Fitzwilliam	James Scambler
1586	William Fitzwilliam	Thomas Hacke
1589	Sir Thomas Reede	Thomas Howland
1593	Sir Thomas Reede	William Hacke
1597	John Wingfield	Alexander Neville
1601	Nicholas Tufton	Goddard Pemberton
1603	Sir Richard Cecil of Wakerley	Edward Wymarke
1614	Sir William Walter	Roger Manwood
1621	Mildmay Fane	Walter Fitzwilliam
1624	Sir Francis Fane	Laurence Whitaker
1625	Sir Christopher Hatton	Laurence Whitaker
1626	Mildmay Fane, Lord Burghersh	Laurence Whitaker
1628	Mildmay Fane, Lord Burghersh	Laurence Whitaker
The Short Parliament (April–May 1640)
April 1640	David Cecil	William FitzWilliam, 2nd Baron FitzWilliam
The Long Parliament (1640–1648), the Rump Parliament (1648–1653) and the Barebone's Parliament (1653)
Nov. 1640	William FitzWilliam, 2nd Baron FitzWilliam	Sir Robert Napier, 2nd Baronet
The First Protectorate Parliament (1654–1655); one member only
1654	Col. Alexander Blake	
The Second (1656–1658) and Third (1659) Protectorate Parliaments
1656	Col. Alexander Blake	Francis St John

==== MPs 1660–1883 ====
The Tories (or Abhorrers) and Whigs (or Petitioners) originated in the Court and Country parties that emerged in the aftermath of the civil war, although it is more accurate to describe them as loose tendencies, both of which might be regarded as conservative in modern terms. Modern party politics did not really begin to coalesce in Great Britain until at least 1784.

Election	First member	1st party	Second member	2nd party
The Rump Parliament recalled (1659) and the Long Parliament restored (1660)
1660	Sir Humphrey Orme	Court	Charles Fane, Lord le Despencer	Country
1666	Sir Humphrey Orme	Court	Edward Palmer	Whig
1667	Sir Humphrey Orme	Court	William FitzWilliam, 3rd Baron FitzWilliam	Whig
1671	Sir Vere Fane	Whig	William FitzWilliam, 3rd Baron FitzWilliam	Whig
Feb. 1679	Francis St John	Whig	William FitzWilliam, 3rd Baron FitzWilliam	Whig
Aug. 1679	Francis St John	Whig	Charles Orme	Whig
1681	Francis St John	Whig	William FitzWilliam, 3rd Baron FitzWilliam	Whig
1685	Charles FitzWilliam	Whig	Charles Orme	Whig
Jan 1689	Charles FitzWilliam	Whig	Sir Gilbert Dolben, 1st Baronet	Whig
Dec 1689	Sir William Brownlow, 4th Baronet	Whig	Sir Gilbert Dolben, 1st Baronet	Whig
1698	Hon. Sidney Wortley-Montagu	Whig	Francis St John	Whig
1701	Hon. Sidney Wortley-Montagu	Whig	Sir Gilbert Dolben, 1st Baronet	Whig
1710	John FitzWilliam, Viscount Milton	Whig	Charles Parker	Tory
1722	John FitzWilliam, Viscount Milton	Whig	Hon. Sidney Wortley-Montagu	Whig
1727	John FitzWilliam, Viscount Milton	Whig	Sir Edward O'Bryan, 2nd Baronet	Tory
1727	John FitzWilliam, Viscount Milton	Whig	Hon. Sidney Wortley-Montagu	Whig
1728 by-election	John FitzWilliam, Viscount Milton	Whig	Joseph Banks	Whig
1729 by-election	Charles Gounter-Nicoll	Whig	Joseph Banks	Whig
Jan. 1734 by-election	Armstead Parker	Tory	Joseph Banks	Whig
April 1734	Armstead Parker	Tory	Sir Edward Wortley Montagu	Whig
1741	William FitzWilliam, 3rd Earl FitzWilliam	Whig	Sir Edward Wortley Montagu	Whig
1742 by-election	Armstead Parker	Tory	Sir Edward Wortley Montagu	Whig
1747	Sir Matthew Lamb, 1st Baronet	Whig	Sir Edward Wortley Montagu	Whig
1761	Sir Matthew Lamb, 1st Baronet	Whig	Armstead Parker	Tory
March 1768	Sir Matthew Lamb, 1st Baronet	Whig	Matthew Wyldbore	Whig
Nov. 1768 by-election	Henry Belasyse, Viscount Belasyse	Whig	Matthew Wyldbore	Whig
1774 by-election	Richard Benyon	Whig	Matthew Wyldbore	Whig
1780	Richard Benyon	Whig	James Farrel Phipps	Whig
1786 by-election	Richard Benyon	Whig	Hon. Lionel Damer	Whig
1796	Dr. French Laurence	Whig	Hon. Lionel Damer	Whig
1802	Dr. French Laurence	Whig	William Elliot	Whig
1809 by-election	Francis Russell, Marquess of Tavistock	Whig	William Elliot	Whig
1812	George Ponsonby	Whig	William Elliot	Whig
1816 by-election	Hon. William Lamb	Whig	William Elliot	Whig
Feb. 1819 by-election	Hon. William Lamb	Whig	Sir James Scarlett	Whig
Nov. 1819 by-election	Sir Robert Heron, 2nd Baronet	Whig	Sir James Scarlett	Whig
Aug. 1830	Sir Robert Heron, 2nd Baronet	Whig	Charles Wentworth-FitzWilliam, Viscount Milton	Whig
Nov. 1830 by-election	Sir Robert Heron, 2nd Baronet	Whig	John Nicholas Fazakerley	Whig
1841	Sir Robert Heron, 2nd Baronet	Whig	Hon. George Wentworth-FitzWilliam	Whig
1847	Hon. William Cavendish	Whig	Hon. George Wentworth-FitzWilliam	Whig
1852	Hon. Richard Watson	Whig	Hon. George Wentworth-FitzWilliam	Whig
1852 by-election	George Hammond Whalley	Radical	Hon. George Wentworth-FitzWilliam	Whig
1853 by-election	Thomson Hankey	Whig	Hon. George Wentworth-FitzWilliam	Whig
1859	Thomson Hankey	Liberal	George Hammond Whalley	Liberal
1868	William Wells	Liberal	George Hammond Whalley	Liberal
1874	Thomson Hankey	Liberal	George Hammond Whalley	Liberal
1878 by-election	Thomson Hankey	Liberal	Hon. John Wentworth-FitzWilliam	Independent Liberal
1880	Hampden Whalley	Liberal	Hon. John Wentworth-FitzWilliam	Independent Liberal
1883 by-election	Sir Sydney Buxton	Liberal	Hon. John Wentworth-FitzWilliam	Independent Liberal
1885	representation reduced to one member			

==== MPs 1885–1918 ====
In 1832 the Tory Party evolved into the Conservative Party and in 1859 the Whig Party evolved, with Radicals and Peelites, into the Liberal Party. In opposition to Irish home rule, the Liberal Unionists ceded from the Liberals in 1886, aligning themselves with the Conservatives. The Labour Party was later founded, as the Labour Representation Committee, in 1900.

Election	Member	Party
1885	Hon. John Wentworth-FitzWilliam	Independent Liberal
1886	Hon. John Wentworth-FitzWilliam	Liberal Unionist
1889 by-election	Sir Alpheus Morton	Liberal
1895	Sir Robert Purvis	Liberal Unionist / Conservative
1906	Sir Granville Greenwood	Liberal
1918	parliamentary borough abolished	

=== Division and county constituency ===
The parliamentary borough of Peterborough was abolished under the Representation of the People Act 1918, and the name was transferred to a division of the new parliamentary county of Northampton with the Soke of Peterborough. The Peterborough division became a county constituency in 1950.

==== MPs 1918–1974 ====
Election	Member	Party
1918	Sir Henry Brassey, 1st Baronet	Coalition Conservative
1929	J. F. Horrabin	Labour
1931	David Cecil, Lord Burghley	Conservative
1943 by-election	John Hely-Hutchinson, Viscount Suirdale	Conservative
1945	Stanley Tiffany	Labour Co-operative
1950	Sir Harmar Nicholls	Conservative
Feb. 1974	county constituency abolished	

=== Borough constituency ===
Peterborough was redefined as a borough constituency with effect from the February 1974 general election. Successors of the historic parliamentary boroughs, the spending limits for election campaigns are slightly lower than in county constituencies.

==== MPs since 1974 ====
Election	Member	Party
Feb. 1974	Sir Harmar Nicholls	Conservative
Oct. 1974	Michael Ward	Labour
1979	Sir Brian Mawhinney	Conservative
1997	Helen Clark	Labour
2005	Stewart Jackson	Conservative
2017	Fiona Onasanya	Labour
2018	Fiona Onasanya	Independent
2019 by-election	Lisa Forbes	Labour
2019	Paul Bristow	Conservative
2024	Andrew Pakes	Labour Co-op

Onasanya sat as an independent after she was suspended by the Labour Party in December 2018. The seat became vacant on 1 May 2019 following a successful recall petition, until 7 June 2019, when Lisa Forbes was elected to the constituency in the 2019 Peterborough by-election, on behalf of the Labour Party.

== Elections ==
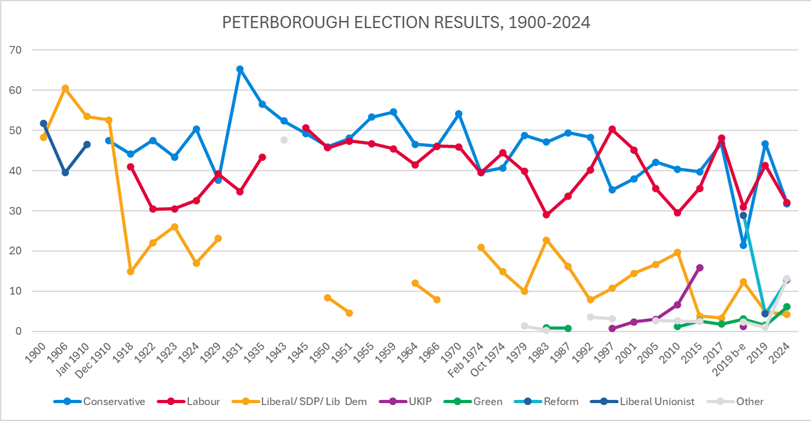
Election results 1900-2024

=== Elections in the 2020s ===
General election 2024: Peterborough
Party	Candidate	Votes	%	±%
Labour Co-op	Andrew Pakes	13,418	32.0	−9.5
Conservative	Paul Bristow	13,300	31.8	−14.7
Reform	Sue Morris	5,379	12.8	+8.3
Workers Party	Amjad Hussain	5,051	12.1	N/A
Green	Nicola Day	2,542	6.1	+4.6
Liberal Democrats	Nick Sandford	1,746	4.2	−0.7
CPA	Tom Rogers	225	0.5	+0.2
Independent	Zahid Khan	211	0.5	N/A
Majority		118	0.2	N/A
Turnout		41,872	57.1	–8.3
Registered electors		73,378		
Labour gain from Conservative		Swing	▲2.6	

=== Elections in the 2010s ===
2019 notional result
Party	Vote	%
Conservative	21,955	46.5
Labour	19,622	41.5
Liberal Democrats	2,316	4.9
Brexit Party	2,102	4.5
Green	713	1.5
Others	524	1.1
Turnout	47,232	65.4
Electorate	72,273	

General election 2019: Peterborough
Party	Candidate	Votes	%	±%
Conservative	Paul Bristow	22,334	46.7	−0.1
Labour	Lisa Forbes	19,754	41.3	−6.8
Liberal Democrats	Beki Sellick	2,334	4.9	+1.6
Brexit Party	Mike Greene	2,127	4.4	N/A
Green	Joseph Wells	728	1.5	−0.3
Independent	Luke Ferguson	260	0.5	N/A
CPA	Tom Rogers	151	0.3	N/A
Monster Raving Loony	The Very Raving Mr P	113	0.2	N/A
Majority		2,580	5.4	N/A
Turnout		47,801	65.9	−0.8
Conservative gain from Labour		Swing	+3.3	

By-election 2019: Peterborough
Party	Candidate	Votes	%	±%
Labour	Lisa Forbes	10,484	30.9	▼17.2
Brexit Party	Mike Greene	9,801	28.9	New
Conservative	Paul Bristow	7,243	21.4	▼25.4
Liberal Democrats	Beki Sellick	4,159	12.3	▲9.0
Green	Joseph Wells	1,035	3.1	▲1.3
UKIP	John Whitby	400	1.2	New
CPA	Tom Rogers	162	0.5	New
English Democrat	Stephen Goldspink	153	0.5	New
SDP	Patrick O'Flynn	135	0.4	New
Monster Raving Loony	Alan Hope	112	0.3	New
Independent	Andrew Moore	101	0.3	New
Common Good	Dick Rodgers	60	0.2	New
Renew	Peter Ward	45	0.1	New
UKEU	Pierre Kirk	25	0.1	New
Give Me Back Elmo	Bobby Smith	5	0.0	New
Majority		683	2.0	▲0.7
Turnout		33,920	48.4	▼18.3
Labour hold		Swing	▼23.6	

General election 2017: Peterborough
Party	Candidate	Votes	%	±%
Labour	Fiona Onasanya	22,950	48.1	+12.5
Conservative	Stewart Jackson	22,343	46.8	+7.1
Liberal Democrats	Beki Sellick	1,597	3.3	−0.4
Green	Fiona Radić	848	1.8	−0.8
Majority		607	1.3	N/A
Turnout		47,738	66.7	+1.8
Labour gain from Conservative		Swing	+2.7	

General election 2015: Peterborough
Party	Candidate	Votes	%	±%
Conservative	Stewart Jackson	18,684	39.7	−0.7
Labour	Lisa Forbes	16,759	35.6	+6.1
UKIP	Mary Herdman	7,485	15.9	+9.2
Liberal Democrats	Darren Fower	1,774	3.8	−15.8
Green	Darren Bisby-Boyd	1,218	2.6	+1.4
Liberal	Chris Ash	639	1.4	New
Independent	John Fox	516	1.1	New
Majority		1,925	4.1	−6.8
Turnout		47,075	64.9	+1.0
Conservative hold		Swing	−3.4	

General election 2010: Peterborough
Party	Candidate	Votes	%	±%
Conservative	Stewart Jackson	18,133	40.4	−2.9
Labour	Ed Murphy	13,272	29.5	−4.8
Liberal Democrats	Nick Sandford	8,816	19.6	+2.9
UKIP	Frances Fox	3,007	6.7	+3.5
English Democrat	Rob King	770	1.7	New
Green	Fiona Radic	523	1.2	New
Independent	John Swallow	406	0.9	New
Majority		4,861	10.9	+4.3
Turnout		44,927	63.9	+2.9
Conservative hold		Swing	+0.95	

=== Elections in the 2000s ===
General election 2005: Peterborough
Party	Candidate	Votes	%	±%
Conservative	Stewart Jackson	17,364	42.1	+4.1
Labour	Helen Clark	14,624	35.5	−9.6
Liberal Democrats	Nick Sandford	6,876	16.7	+2.2
UKIP	Mary Herdman	1,242	3.0	+0.6
National Front	Terry Blackham	931	2.3	New
Independent	Marc Potter	167	0.4	New
Majority		2,740	6.6	N/A
Turnout		41,194	61.0	−0.4
Conservative gain from Labour		Swing	+6.85	

General election 2001: Peterborough
Party	Candidate	Votes	%	±%
Labour	Helen Brinton	17,975	45.1	−5.2
Conservative	Stewart Jackson	15,121	38.0	+2.8
Liberal Democrats	Nick Sandford	5,761	14.5	+3.8
UKIP	Julian Fairweather	955	2.4	+1.7
Majority		2,854	7.1	−8.0
Turnout		39,812	61.4	−11.4
Labour hold		Swing	−4.0	

=== Elections in the 1990s ===
General election 1997: Peterborough
Party	Candidate	Votes	%	±%
Labour	Helen Brinton	24,365	50.3	+12.5
Conservative	Jacqueline Foster	17,042	35.2	−14.3
Liberal Democrats	David Howarth	5,170	10.7	+1.4
Referendum	Philip Slater	924	1.91	New
Natural Law	Charles Brettell	334	0.7	+0.4
UKIP	John Linskey	317	0.7	New
ProLife Alliance	Stephen Goldspink	275	0.6	New
Majority		7,323	15.1	N/A
Turnout		48,427	72.8	−2.3
Labour gain from Conservative		Swing	+11.6	

General election 1992: Peterborough
Party	Candidate	Votes	%	±%
Conservative	Brian Mawhinney	31,827	48.3	−1.1
Labour	Julie Owens	26,451	40.2	+6.5
Liberal Democrats	Amanda Taylor	5,208	7.9	−8.2
Liberal	Erbie Murat	1,557	2.4	New
BNP	Richard Heaton	311	0.5	New
Independent	Pamela Beasley	271	0.4	New
Natural Law	Charles Brettell	215	0.3	New
Majority		5,376	8.1	−7.6
Turnout		65,840	75.1	+1.6
Conservative hold		Swing	−3.8	

=== Elections in the 1980s ===
General election 1987: Peterborough
Party	Candidate	Votes	%	±%
Conservative	Brian Mawhinney	30,624	49.4	+2.3
Labour	Andrew MacKinlay	20,840	33.7	+4.7
Liberal	David Green	9,984	16.1	−6.6
Green	Nigel Callaghan	506	0.8	−0.1
Majority		9,784	15.7	−2.4
Turnout		61,951	73.5	+0.2
Conservative hold		Swing	−1.2	

General election 1983: Peterborough
Party	Candidate	Votes	%	±%
Conservative	Brian Mawhinney	27,270	47.1	−1.7
Labour	Brian Fish	16,831	29.0	−10.8
SDP	Elizabeth Walston	13,142	22.7	+12.7
Ecology	Nigel Callaghan	511	0.9	New
Workers Revolutionary	DE Hyland	155	0.3	+0.1
Majority		10,439	18.1	+9.1
Turnout		57,909	73.3	−4.6
Conservative hold		Swing	+4.5	

=== Elections in the 1970s ===
General election 1979: Peterborough
Party	Candidate	Votes	%	±%
Conservative	Brian Mawhinney	27,734	48.80	+8.12
Labour	Michael Ward	22,632	39.82	−4.63
Liberal	D Green	5,685	10.00	−4.87
National Front	J Willhelmy	672	1.18	New
Workers Revolutionary	M Bishop	106	0.19	New
Majority		5,102	8.98	N/A
Turnout		56,829	77.94	+0.07
Conservative gain from Labour		Swing	+6.37	

General election October 1974: Peterborough
Party	Candidate	Votes	%	±%
Labour	Michael Ward	21,820	44.45	+4.94
Conservative	Harmar Nicholls	19,972	40.68	+1.13
Liberal	Peter Boizot	7,302	14.87	−6.06
Majority		1,848	3.77	N/A
Turnout		49,094	77.87	−4.45
Labour gain from Conservative		Swing	+1.91	

General election February 1974: Peterborough
Party	Candidate	Votes	%	±%
Conservative	Harmar Nicholls	20,353	39.55	−14.53
Labour	Michael Ward	20,331	39.51	−6.41
Liberal	Peter Boizot	10,772	20.93	New
Majority		22	0.04	−8.12
Turnout		51,456	82.32	+3.83
Conservative hold		Swing	−4.06	

General election 1970: Peterborough
Party	Candidate	Votes	%	±%
Conservative	Harmar Nicholls	30,227	54.08	+8.01
Labour	Michael Ward	25,662	45.92	−0.14
Majority		4,565	8.16	+8.15
Turnout		55,889	78.49	−2.93
Conservative hold		Swing	+4.08	

=== Elections in the 1960s ===
General election 1966: Peterborough
Party	Candidate	Votes	%	±%
Conservative	Harmar Nicholls	23,944	46.07	−0.48
Labour	Michael Ward	23,941	46.06	+4.58
Liberal	Basil Goldstone	4,093	7.87	−4.10
Majority		3	0.01	−5.06
Turnout		51,978	81.42	−0.34
Conservative hold		Swing	−2.53	

General election 1964: Peterborough
Party	Candidate	Votes	%	±%
Conservative	Harmar Nicholls	24,045	46.55	−8.01
Labour	David Saunders	21,428	41.48	−3.96
Liberal	Lawrence Young	6,181	11.97	New
Majority		2,617	5.07	−4.05
Turnout		51,654	81.76	−1.23
Conservative hold		Swing	−2.03	

=== Elections in the 1950s ===
General election 1959: Peterborough
Party	Candidate	Votes	%	±%
Conservative	Harmar Nicholls	27,414	54.56	+1.28
Labour	Betty Boothroyd	22,830	45.44	−1.28
Majority		4,584	9.12	+2.56
Turnout		50,244	82.99	−0.02
Conservative hold		Swing	+1.28	

General election 1955: Peterborough
Party	Candidate	Votes	%	±%
Conservative	Harmar Nicholls	26,319	53.28	+5.23
Labour	Albert Farrer	23,081	46.72	−0.60
Majority		3,238	6.56	+5.83
Turnout		49,400	83.01	−3.79
Conservative hold		Swing	+2.92	

General election 1951: Peterborough
Party	Candidate	Votes	%	±%
Conservative	Harmar Nicholls	24,536	48.05	+2.11
Labour	Albert Farrer	24,163	47.32	+1.67
Liberal	Wolf Isaac Akst	2,367	4.64	−3.78
Majority		373	0.73	+0.44
Turnout		51,066	86.80	−0.43
Conservative hold		Swing	+0.22	

General election 1950: Peterborough
Party	Candidate	Votes	%	±%
Conservative	Harmar Nicholls	22,815	45.94	−3.36
Labour Co-op	Stanley Tiffany	22,671	45.65	−5.05
Liberal	Wolf Isaac Akst	4,180	8.42	New
Majority		144	0.29	N/A
Turnout		49,666	86.37	+13.47
Conservative gain from Labour		Swing	+0.7	

=== Elections in the 1940s ===
General election 1945: Peterborough
Party	Candidate	Votes	%	±%
Labour Co-op	Stanley Tiffany	22,056	50.7	+7.3
Conservative	John Hely-Hutchinson	21,485	49.3	−7.3
Majority		571	1.4	N/A
Turnout		43,541	72.9	−7.9
Labour Co-op gain from Conservative		Swing		

1943 Peterborough by-election
Party	Candidate	Votes	%	±%
Conservative	John Hely-Hutchinson	11,976	52.4	−4.2
Independent Labour	Samuel Bennett	10,890	47.6	New
Majority		1,086	4.8	−8.4
Turnout		22,866		
Conservative hold		Swing		

General Election 1939–40 Another general election was required to take place before the end of 1940. The political parties had been making preparations for an election to take place from 1939 and by the end of this year, the following candidates had been selected:

- Conservative: David Cecil
- Labour: Samuel Bennett

=== Elections in the 1930s ===
General election 1935: Peterborough
Party	Candidate	Votes	%	±%
Conservative	David Cecil	22,677	56.6	−8.6
Labour	Ernest A J Davies	17,373	43.4	+8.6
Majority		5,304	13.2	−17.2
Turnout		40,050	80.8	−4.4
Conservative hold		Swing		

General election 1931: Peterborough
Party	Candidate	Votes	%	±%
Conservative	David Cecil	26,640	65.2	+27.5
Labour	Frank Horrabin	14,206	34.8	−4.4
Majority		12,434	30.4	N/A
Turnout		40,846	85.2	+4.6
Conservative gain from Labour		Swing		

=== Elections in the 1920s ===
General election 1929: Peterborough
Party	Candidate	Votes	%	±%
Labour	Frank Horrabin	14,743	39.2	+6.6
Unionist	Henry Brassey	14,218	37.7	−12.7
Liberal	Francis Hill	8,704	23.1	+6.1
Majority		525	1.5	N/A
Turnout		37,665	80.6	+3.4
Registered electors		46,704		
Labour gain from Unionist		Swing	+9.7	

General election 1924: Peterborough
Party	Candidate	Votes	%	±%
Unionist	Henry Brassey	14,195	50.4	+7.0
Labour	John Mansfield	9,180	32.6	+2.1
Liberal	Daniel Boyle	4,786	17.0	−9.1
Majority		5,015	17.8	+4.9
Turnout		28,161	77.2	+2.8
Registered electors		36,461		
Unionist hold		Swing	+2.5	

General election 1923: Peterborough
Party	Candidate	Votes	%	±%
Unionist	Henry Brassey	11,634	43.4	−4.1
Labour	John Mansfield	8,177	30.5	+0.1
Liberal	Daniel Boyle	7,014	26.1	+4.0
Majority		3,457	12.9	−4.2
Turnout		26,825	74.4	−6.2
Registered electors		36,049		
Unionist hold		Swing	−2.1	

General election 1922: Peterborough
Party	Candidate	Votes	%	±%
Unionist	Henry Brassey	13,560	47.5	+3.4
Labour	John Mansfield	8,668	30.4	−10.6
Liberal	George Nicholls	6,290	22.1	+7.2
Majority		4,892	17.1	+14.0
Turnout		28,518	80.6	+18.4
Registered electors		35,393		
Unionist hold		Swing	+7.0	

=== Elections in the 1910s ===
General election 1918: Peterborough
Party		Candidate	Votes	%	±%
C	Unionist	Henry Brassey	9,516	44.1	−3.3
	Labour	John Mansfield	8,832	41.0	New
	Liberal	Thomas Ivatt Slater	3,214	14.9	−37.7
Majority			684	3.1	N/A
Turnout			21,562	62.2	−27.8
Registered electors			34,676		
	Unionist gain from Liberal		Swing	+17.2	
C indicates candidate endorsed by the coalition government.

General election December 1910: Peterborough
Party	Candidate	Votes	%	±%
Liberal	George Greenwood	3,105	52.6	−0.9
Conservative	Henry Lygon	2,802	47.4	+0.9
Majority		303	5.2	−1.8
Turnout		5,907	90.0	−4.2
Registered electors		6,564		
Liberal hold		Swing	−0.9	

General election January 1910: Peterborough
Party	Candidate	Votes	%	±%
Liberal	George Greenwood	3,308	53.5	−7.0
Liberal Unionist	Robert Purvis	2,875	46.5	+7.0
Majority		433	7.0	−14.0
Turnout		6,183	94.2	+3.0
Registered electors		6,564		
Liberal hold		Swing	−7.0	

=== Elections in the 1900s ===
General election 1906: Peterborough
Party	Candidate	Votes	%	±%
Liberal	George Greenwood	3,326	60.5	+12.3
Liberal Unionist	Robert Purvis	2,167	39.5	−12.3
Majority		1,159	21.0	N/A
Turnout		5,493	91.2	+6.9
Registered electors		6,025		
Liberal gain from Liberal Unionist		Swing	+12.3	

General election 1900: Peterborough
Party	Candidate	Votes	%	±%
Liberal Unionist	Robert Purvis	2,315	51.8	−1.0
Liberal	Halley Stewart	2,155	48.2	+1.0
Majority		160	3.6	−2.0
Turnout		4,470	84.3	−5.1
Registered electors		5,300		
Liberal Unionist hold		Swing	−1.0	

=== Elections in the 1890s ===
General election 1895: Peterborough
Party	Candidate	Votes	%	±%
Liberal Unionist	Robert Purvis	2,259	52.8	+4.8
Liberal	Alpheus Morton	2,020	47.2	−4.8
Majority		239	5.6	N/A
Turnout		4,279	89.4	+3.5
Registered electors		4,787		
Liberal Unionist gain from Liberal		Swing	+4.8	

General election 1892: Peterborough
Party	Candidate	Votes	%	±%
Liberal	Alpheus Morton	2,037	52.0	+6.4
Liberal Unionist	Robert Purvis	1,879	48.0	−6.4
Majority		158	4.0	N/A
Turnout		3,916	85.9	+1.7
Registered electors		4,559		
Liberal gain from Liberal Unionist		Swing	+6.4	

=== Elections in the 1880s ===
By-election, 7 Oct 1889: Peterborough
Party	Candidate	Votes	%	±%
Liberal	Alpheus Morton	1,893	53.6	+8.0
Liberal Unionist	Robert Purvis	1,642	46.4	−8.0
Majority		251	7.2	N/A
Turnout		3,535	87.2	+2.9
Registered electors		4,056		
Liberal gain from Liberal Unionist		Swing	+8.0	

- Caused by Wentworth-Fitzwilliam's death.

General election 1886: Peterborough
Party	Candidate	Votes	%	±%
Liberal Unionist	John Wentworth-FitzWilliam	1,780	54.4	+0.7
Liberal	George Greenwood	1,491	45.6	−0.7
Majority		289	8.8	+1.4
Turnout		3,271	84.3	−4.5
Registered electors		3,882		
Liberal Unionist gain from Independent Liberal		Swing		

General election 1885: Peterborough
Party	Candidate	Votes	%	±%
Independent Liberal	John Wentworth-FitzWilliam	1,853	53.7	+19.3
Liberal	Sydney Buxton	1,595	46.3	+1.7
Majority		258	7.4	−9.1
Turnout		3,448	88.8	+19.5 (est)
Registered electors		3,882		
Independent Liberal hold		Swing	+8.8	

By-election, 23 Jun 1883: Peterborough (1 seat)
Party	Candidate	Votes	%	±%
Liberal	Sydney Buxton	1,438	56.5	−22.5
Conservative	John Adam Ferguson	1,106	43.5	+22.5
Majority		332	13.0	+7.3
Turnout		2,544	70.9	+1.6 (est)
Registered electors		3,589		
Liberal hold		Swing	−22.5	

- Caused by Whalley's resignation.

General election 1880: Peterborough (2 seats)
Party	Candidate	Votes	%	±%
Independent Liberal	John Wentworth-FitzWilliam	1,615	34.4	N/A
Liberal	Hampden Whalley	1,257	26.7	−7.4
Conservative	Robert Tennant	987	21.0	+3.8
Liberal	Thomson Hankey	841	17.9	−16.2
Turnout		2,350 (est)	69.3 (est)	−4.8
Registered electors		3,393		
Majority		774	16.5	N/A
Independent Liberal gain from Liberal		Swing		
Majority		270	5.7	−5.7
Liberal hold		Swing		

=== Elections in the 1870s ===
By-election, 29 Oct 1878: Peterborough (1 seat)
Party	Candidate	Votes	%	±%
Independent Liberal	John Wentworth-FitzWilliam	1,360	50.5	New
Conservative	John Lawrance	671	24.9	+7.7
Liberal	James Hayes Raper	653	24.3	−43.9
Lib-Lab	George Potter	8	0.3	−14.3
Majority		689	25.6	N/A
Turnout		2,692	80.6	+6.5
Registered electors		3,340		
Independent Liberal gain from Liberal		Swing	N/A	

- Caused by Whalley's death. Raper was a 'Permissive Bill' candidate.

General election 1874: Peterborough (2 seats)
Party	Candidate	Votes	%	±%
Liberal	Thomson Hankey	1,135	29.4	+6.3
Liberal	George Hammond Whalley	1,105	28.6	−2.5
Conservative	Henry Wrenfordsley	666	17.2	+12.6
Lib-Lab	George Potter	562	14.6	N/A
Liberal	Neville Goodman	323	8.4	N/A
Liberal	Robert Malcolm Kerr	71	1.8	N/A
Majority		439	11.4	+3.4
Turnout		2,264 (est)	74.1 (est)	−2.6
Registered electors		3,056		
Liberal hold		Swing	+0.0	
Liberal hold		Swing	−4.4	

=== Elections in the 1860s ===
General election 1868: Peterborough (2 seats)
Party	Candidate	Votes	%	±%
Liberal	William Wells	1,282	35.5	+3.7
Liberal	George Hammond Whalley	1,122	31.1	−4.2
Liberal	Thomson Hankey	834	23.1	−10.5
Liberal	William Green	204	5.7	N/A
Conservative	Henry Wrenfordsley	167	4.6	New
Majority		288	8.0	+6.2
Turnout		1,888 (est)	76.7 (est)	+1.6
Registered electors		2,461		
Liberal hold		Swing		
Liberal hold		Swing		

- Green, a Radical liberal, withdrew before polling.

General election 1865: Peterborough (2 seats)
Party	Candidate	Votes	%	±%
Liberal	George Hammond Whalley	340	35.3	+7.5
Liberal	Thomson Hankey	320	33.6	+3.4
Liberal	William Wells	303	31.8	N/A
Majority		17	1.8	−4.6
Turnout		482 (est)	75.1 (est)	−5.0
Registered electors		641		
Liberal hold		Swing	N/A	
Liberal hold		Swing	N/A	

=== Elections in the 1850s ===
General election 1859: Peterborough (2 seats)
Party	Candidate	Votes	%	±%
Liberal	Thomson Hankey	275	30.2	−4.4
Liberal	George Hammond Whalley	253	27.8	+4.2
Conservative	John Harvey Lee Wingfield	195	21.4	New
Liberal	James Wilde	187	20.5	N/A
Majority		58	6.4	−4.6
Turnout		455 (est)	80.1 (est)	+9.3
Registered electors		568		
Liberal hold		Swing		
Liberal hold		Swing		

General election 1857: Peterborough (2 seats)
Party	Candidate	Votes	%	±%
Whig	George Wentworth-FitzWilliam	321	41.8	+4.6
Whig	Thomson Hankey	266	34.6	+1.8
Radical	George Hammond Whalley	181	23.6	N/A
Majority		85	11.0	+8.2
Turnout		384 (est)	70.8 (est)	−16.9
Registered electors		542		
Whig hold		Swing		
Whig hold		Swing		

By-election, 25 June 1853: Peterborough
Party	Candidate	Votes	%	±%
Radical	George Hammond Whalley	236	52.3	+0.6
Whig	Thomson Hankey	215	47.7	−0.6
Majority		21	4.6	+1.2
Turnout		451	85.7	0.0
Registered electors		526		
Radical hold		Swing	+0.6	

- Caused by the 1852 by-election being declared void on petition due to bribery and treating. Although Whalley secured the most votes, his election was declared void owing to disqualification due to the earlier bribery and treating, and Hankey was declared elected.

By-election, 6 December 1852: Peterborough
Party	Candidate	Votes	%	±%
Radical	George Hammond Whalley	233	51.7	N/A
Whig	George Cornewall Lewis	218	48.3	−21.7
Majority		15	3.4	N/A
Turnout		451	85.7	−2.0
Registered electors		526		
Radical gain from Whig		Swing		

- Caused by Watson's death.

General election 1852: Peterborough (2 seats)
Party	Candidate	Votes	%	±%
Whig	George Wentworth-FitzWilliam	260	37.2	N/A
Whig	Richard Watson	229	32.8	N/A
Conservative	John Talbot Clifton	210	30.0	New
Majority		19	2.8	N/A
Turnout		455 (est)	87.7 (est)	N/A
Registered electors		518		
Whig hold		Swing	N/A	
Whig hold		Swing	N/A	

=== Elections in the 1840s ===
General election 1847: Peterborough (2 seats)
Party	Candidate	Votes	%	±%
Whig	George Wentworth-FitzWilliam	Unopposed		
Whig	William Cavendish	Unopposed		
Registered electors		553		
Whig hold				
Whig hold				

General election 1841: Peterborough (2 seats)
Party	Candidate	Votes	%	±%
Whig	George Wentworth-FitzWilliam	317	38.8	+1.5
Whig	Robert Heron	255	31.3	−3.3
Conservative	Thomas Gladstone	244	29.9	+1.8
Majority		11	1.4	−5.1
Turnout		495	85.9	−3.6
Registered electors		576		
Whig hold		Swing	+0.3	
Whig hold		Swing	−2.1	

=== Elections in the 1830s ===
General election 1837: Peterborough (2 seats)
Party	Candidate	Votes	%	±%
Whig	John Nicholas Fazakerley	311	37.3	−1.9
Whig	Robert Heron	288	34.6	+0.5
Conservative	William Edward Surtees	234	28.1	+1.4
Majority		54	6.5	−0.9
Turnout		494	89.5	+3.2
Registered electors		552		
Whig hold		Swing	−1.3	
Whig hold		Swing	−0.1	

General election 1835: Peterborough (2 seats)
Party	Candidate	Votes	%
Whig	John Nicholas Fazakerley	412	39.2
Whig	Robert Heron	358	34.1
Conservative	Walker Ferrand	281	26.7
Majority		77	7.4
Turnout		591	86.3
Registered electors		685	
Whig hold			
Whig hold			

General election 1832: Peterborough (2 seats)
Party	Candidate	Votes	%
Whig	John Nicholas Fazakerley	Unopposed	
Whig	Robert Heron	Unopposed	
Registered electors		773	
Whig hold			
Whig hold			

General election 1831: Peterborough (2 seats)
Party	Candidate	Votes	%
Whig	John Nicholas Fazakerley	Unopposed	
Whig	Robert Heron	Unopposed	
Registered electors		c. 730	
Whig hold			
Whig hold			

By-election, 24 November 1830: Peterborough
Party	Candidate	Votes	%
Whig	John Nicholas Fazakerley	Unopposed	
Whig hold			

- Caused by Wentworth-FitzWilliam's resignation

General election 1830: Peterborough (2 seats)
Party	Candidate	Votes	%
Whig	Charles Wentworth-Fitzwilliam	Unopposed	
Whig	Robert Heron	Unopposed	
Whig hold			
Whig hold			

== See also ==
- List of parliamentary constituencies in Cambridgeshire
