= Sir Gilbert Dolben, 1st Baronet =

English lawyer and politician

Sir Gilbert Dolben, 1st Baronet (1658–1722), of Finedon, Northamptonshire, was an English lawyer, landowner and Tory politician who sat in the English and British House of Commons between 1685 and 1715. He also served as a High Court judge in Ireland for many years. He was the grandfather of the leading anti-slavery campaigner Sir William Dolben.

== Background ==
Dolben was the elder son of John Dolben, Archbishop of York, and his wife Catherine Sheldon, daughter of Ralph Sheldon of Stanton, Staffordshire. His background was strongly episcopal: he was a grand-nephew of Gilbert Sheldon, Archbishop of Canterbury and a more remote connection of John Williams, Archbishop of York. His uncle Sir William Dolben was a distinguished judge. He was the elder brother of John Dolben, who had a similar but much less successful career as a barrister and politician.

Samuel Pepys, who saw him as a child, described him as "a very pretty boy, and very like his father in appearance". He went to Westminster School and matriculated at Christ Church, Oxford on 18 July 1674, aged 15, but did not take a degree. He entered the Inner Temple in 1674, and was called to the Bar in 1680. For a short time, he pursued a career in diplomacy, but decided on a full-time legal practice. He was slow to build up his practice, something about which he grumbled a good deal, but did not suffer financially as he had married an heiress.

== Politician ==
Dolben was appointed Justice of the Peace for the West Riding of Yorkshire in 1684. He first entered Parliament at the 1685 English general election when returned unopposed as MP for Ripon on his father's interest. He was active in Parliament, and was appointed to 14 committees, many of them church-related, including those for preventing clandestine marriages, for rebuilding St Paul's Cathedral, for repairing Bangor Cathedral and for naturalizing Protestant refugees. He was appointed Justice of the Peace for Northamptonshire in 1686. In 1688, he returned negative answers on the repeal of the Test Act and the Penal Laws and was dismissed from the Commission of the Peace. Although he was nominally a Tory in politics, he supported the Glorious Revolution and was subsequently restored to his offices. At the 1689 English general election he was returned unopposed as MP for Peterborough, probably in the interest of the dean and chapter of Peterborough Cathedral. He was very busy in Parliament, and was on 51 committees. He made nine recorded speeches and was the first MP to declare in the House that the reign of King James II was at an end, and argued with great force that the King could be deemed to have abdicated. In 1689 he was appointed a Gentleman of the Privy Chamber.

Dolben was returned unopposed as Tory MP for Peterborough at the 1690 in his own interest, and worked with the Court party. He conducted a considerable amount of routine parliamentary business, and was noted as one of the lawyers particularly interested in introducing legislative change. He was returned again at the 1695 general election. He refused to take the Oath of Association, introduced by the House of Commons after the failure of the Jacobite assassination plot 1696, apparently, because he objected to the reference to the life of King William III having been saved by divine providence, which in his view raised the question of whether he was King by Divine Right. As a result, he lost his place on the Commission of the Peace for the second time. In late March 1696, he voted against fixing the price of guineas at 22 shillings. He opposed the attainder of Sir John Fenwick for treason and made a long speech on 25 November 1696, arguing that the case should be dealt with by an ordinary process of criminal law, and voted against the attainder. He spoke and voted on many issues, but was a particularly strong supporter of the Blasphemy Act 1697. He did not stand at the 1698 English general election.

Dolben was returned again for Peterborough at the first general election of 1701. After Parliament was dissolved he was blacklisted for opposing the preparations for war against France. On 13 May 1701, he was appointed a judge of the common pleas in Ireland and about this time he was restored to the commission of the peace. He was returned at the second general election of 1701 and remained active in Parliament. He was involved in preparing a bill to prevent bribery at elections on 17 January 1702) and as a Tory, he supported the motion of 26 February 1702 which vindicated the Commons’ proceedings in the impeachments of William III's ministers. He was returned again for Peterborough in 1702, 1705 and 1708. At the 1710 British general election he transferred to Yarmouth, Isle of Wight, where he was returned as a Tory MP in the interest of John Richmond Webb, the Tory governor of the island. He was returned again at the 1713 British general election.

In the debates following the celebrated judgment in Ashby v White, Dolben argued strongly that the House of Commons had exclusive jurisdiction over all disputed Parliamentary elections.

== Judge ==
When Dolben became a judge of the Court of Common Pleas (Ireland) in 1701, he joined the King's Inn, the professional body which governed the Irish Bar He retained the post on the accession of Queen Anne in 1702. He remained a member of the English House of Commons, and divided his time between England and Ireland, somewhat to the neglect of his judicial duties. Though he was said to be on bad terms with Thomas Wharton, 1st Marquess of Wharton, the Lord Lieutenant of Ireland from 1708, his career in Ireland seems to have been uneventful. He was one of the few High Court judges who refused to become involved in the bitter feud between the Crown and Dublin Corporation in 1713–4. Perhaps for this reason, or perhaps because of his wealth and social standing (he had married an heiress and was made a baronet in 1704) he was the only senior Irish judge who was not removed from office in the general purge of the Irish judiciary which followed the death of Queen Anne. He solicited for a seat on the English Bench but did not receive it and remained on the Irish Bench until he retired in 1720. He was a bencher of his Temple and acted as its treasurer in 1721. He is said to have been one of the few investors who enriched themselves, rather than suffering losses, in the South Sea Bubble.

== Family and personality ==
By 1683, Dolben married Anne Mulso, eldest daughter and co-heiress with her sister Elizabeth (who married his brother John) of Tanfield Mulso of Finedon Hall, Northamptonshire and his wife Mary Luther, a marriage which greatly increased his wealth. They had one surviving son, Sir John Dolben, 2nd Baronet, who was father of Sir William Dolben, 3rd Baronet, a leader in the movement for the abolition of slavery. He died at Finedon in October 1722.

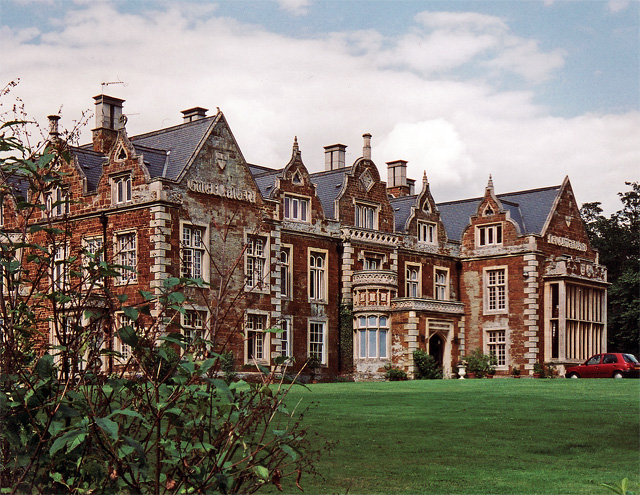
Finedon Hall, the family home of Dolben's wife, Anne Mulso

For many years he was greatly troubled by the profligacy of his brother John, an inveterate gambler who ran through all his own money and then his wife's. In 1691 Gilbert wrote that John's wife and children were living on the charity of friends, something he described as shameful for the family, and a reproach to his father's memory, as critics accused the Archbishop of having been a neglectful parent.

He was a man of scholarly tastes: John Dryden acknowledged the help Dolben had given him in preparing his translations of Virgil.

Parliament of England
Preceded by Christopher Wandesford; Richard Sterne	Member of Parliament for Ripon; 1685–1689; With: Sir Edmund Jennings	Succeeded by Sir Jonathan Jennings; Sir Edward Blackett, Bt
Preceded by Charles FitzWilliam; Charles Orme	Member of Parliament for Peterborough; 1689–1698; With: Charles FitzWilliam 1689; Sir William Brownlow, 4th Baronet 1689-1698	Succeeded by Hon. Sidney Wortley-Montagu; Francis St John
Preceded by Hon. Sidney Wortley-Montagu; Francis St John	Member of Parliament for Peterborough; 1701–1707; With: Hon. Sidney Wortley-Montagu	Succeeded by Parliament of Great Britain
Parliament of Great Britain
Preceded by Parliament of England	Member of Parliament for Peterborough; 1707–1710; With: Hon. Sidney Wortley-Montagu	Succeeded by John FitzWilliam, Viscount Milton; Charles Parker
Preceded by Henry Holmes; Anthony Morgan	Member of Parliament for Yarmouth (Isle of Wight); 1710–1715; With: Henry Holmes	Succeeded by Henry Holmes; Sir Robert Raymond
Baronetage of England
New creation	Baronet (of Findon); 1704-1722	Succeeded by John Dolben
