= Peterborough Guildhall =

Municipal building in Peterborough, Cambridgeshire, England

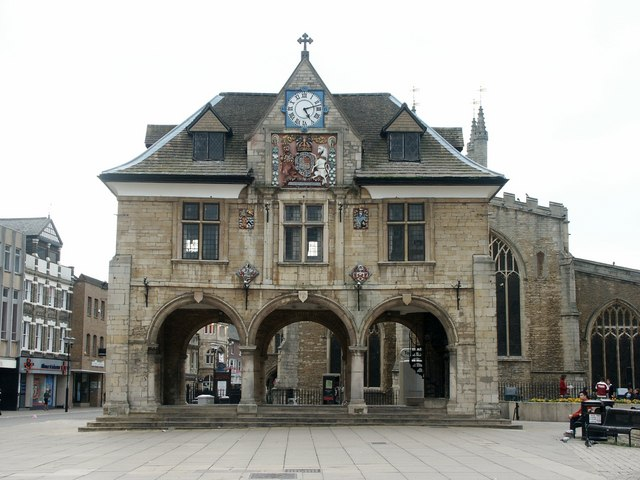
- Peterborough Guildhall

- Shown in Cambridgeshire
- 52.5726°N 0.2431°W
- Location: Cathedral Square, Peterborough

History
- Built: 1671

Site notes
- Architect: John Lovin
- Architectural style: Classical style

Listed Building – Grade II*
- Designated: 7 February 1952
- Reference no.: 1126990

The Guildhall is a municipal building in Cathedral Square, Peterborough, Cambridgeshire, England. It is a Grade II* listed building.

== History ==
The current structure replaced a medieval guildhall which was situated on the northern side of Cathedral Square. The local people decided to erect a new structure to commemorate the restoration of the monarchy in 1660. The site selected for the new building had previously been occupied by the "Butter Cross" or dairy market.

The current building, which was designed by John Lovin who had also been the architect for the restoration work on the Bishop's Palace in Peterborough, was completed in 1671. It was designed in the Classical style with arcading on the ground floor to allow markets to be held; an assembly room with mullion windows was established on the first floor. It is very similar in design to the Old Town Hall in Amsterdam which was painted by Pieter Jansz before it was demolished. The building, which was funded by public subscription, bears the Royal arms of King Charles II and shields displaying the arms of Bishop Joseph Henshaw, Dean James Duport, Humphrey Orme MP and the Montagu family.

In the early 20th century the building was the traditional meeting place for the historic Fitzwilliam Hunt. At that time the guildhall was physically connected to other buildings, which have since been demolished, on the St John's Church side.

The building benefited from some restoration work in 1929. The upper floor of the guildhall, which is reached by a cast iron staircase, was the meeting place of Peterborough Municipal Borough Council from its incorporation in 1874 until the new Town Hall in Bridge Street was completed in 1933. The council proposed a scheme in the early 21st century whereby the open ground floor, which had once created a space where the butter and poultry markets could operate, would be enclosed by glass; this scheme was abandoned on the grounds of cost.

On 4 July 2012 the guildhall was the starting point for the Olympic flame's journey on day 47 before leaving for Lincolnshire as part of its relay tour of the United Kingdom as part of preparations for the 2012 Summer Olympics.
