= 1878 Peterborough by-election =

UK parliamentary by-election

The 1878 Peterborough by-election was fought on 29 October 1878. The by-election was fought due to the death of the incumbent Liberal MP, George Hammond Whalley.

== The result ==
It was won and gained by the Independent Liberal candidate John Wentworth-FitzWilliam.

Peterborough by-election, 29 October 1878
Party	Candidate	Votes	%	±%
Independent Liberal	John Wentworth-FitzWilliam	1,360	50.5	New
Conservative	John Lawrance	671	24.9	+7.7
Liberal	James Hayes Raper	653	24.3	−43.9
Lib-Lab	George Potter	8	0.3	−14.3
Majority		689	25.6	N/A
Turnout		2,692	80.6	+6.5
Independent Liberal gain from Liberal		Swing		
