= John Fitzwilliam, 2nd Earl Fitzwilliam =

English peer and politician

The Earl FitzWilliam
- 2nd Earl Fitzwilliam
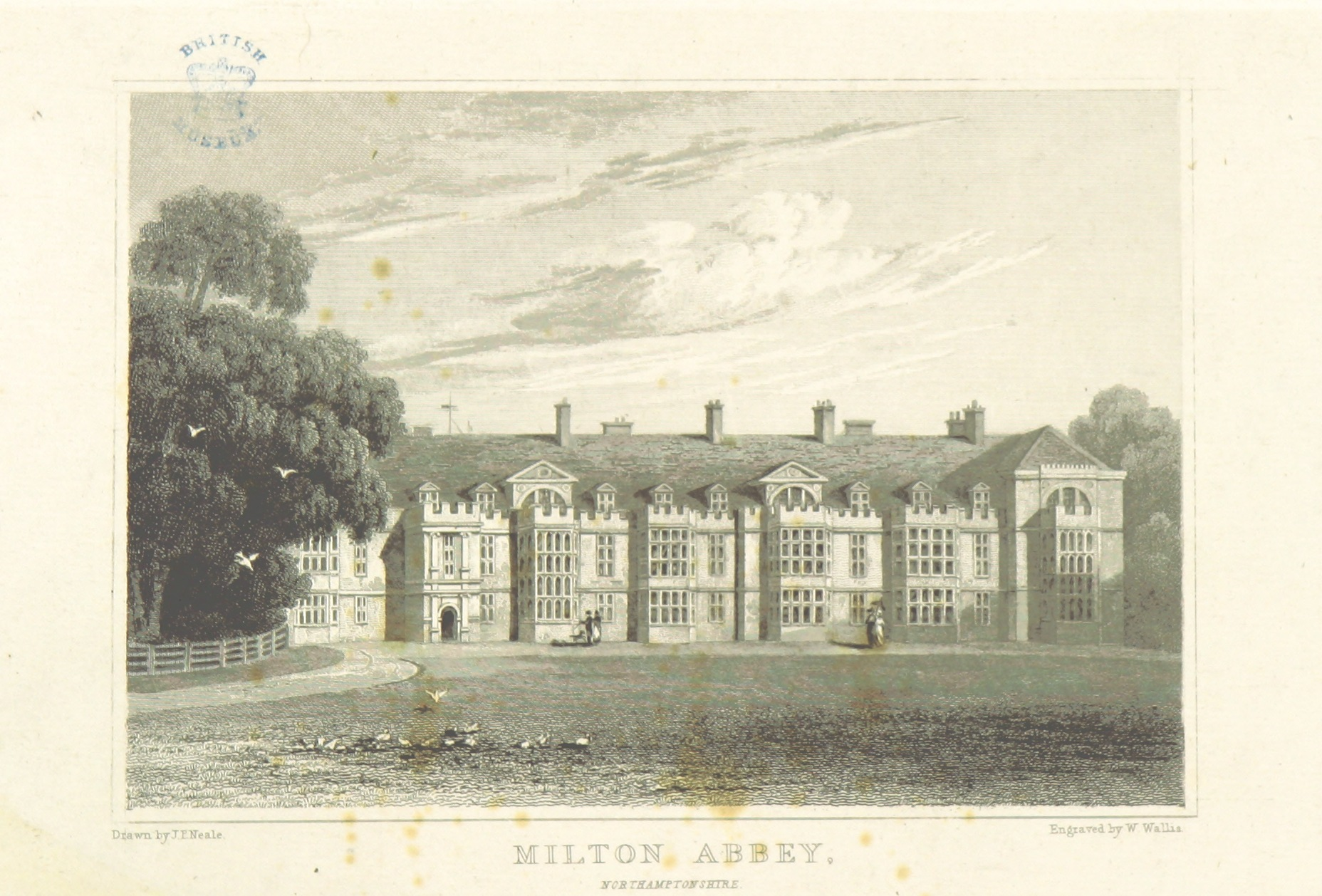
- Milton Abbey, Northamptonshire (1818)
- Predecessor: William Fitzwilliam, 1st Earl Fitzwilliam
- Successor: William Fitzwilliam, 3rd Earl Fitzwilliam
- Born: ca. 1685
- Died: 28 August 1728
- Spouse: Anne Stringer
- Issue: 4 (including William Fitzwilliam, 3rd Earl Fitzwilliam)
- Parents: William Fitzwilliam, 1st Earl Fitzwilliam; Anne Cremor

John Fitzwilliam, 2nd Earl Fitzwilliam MP (circa 1685 – 28 August 1728) of Milton, near Peterborough was an English peer and politician who sat in the House of Commons from 1710 to 1728. The peerage was in the Peerage of Ireland.

Fitzwilliam was the only surviving son of William Fitzwilliam, 1st Earl Fitzwilliam and his wife Anne Cremer, daughter of Edmund Cremer of West Winch, Norfolk.

He was elected Member of Parliament for Peterborough at the 1710 general election and retained the seat in 1713. He was returned unopposed at the 1715 general election. On 17 September 1718, he married Anne Stringer and in 1719 he succeeded his father as 2nd Earl Fitzwilliam, but as it was an Irish peerage it did not affect his entitlement to sit in the House of Commons. He was re-elected as MP for Peterborough at the general elections of 1722 and 1727.

He inherited Milton Hall near Peterborough from his father (in 1719) and developed the stables, park and gardens.

Fitzwilliam died of a fever on 28 August 1728. He and his wife had four children. He was succeeded in his titles and estates by his eldest son, William Fitzwilliam.

Parliament of Great Britain
| Preceded by Sidney Wortley-Montagu; Sir Gilbert Dolben, Bt | Member of Parliament for Peterborough; 1710–1728; With: Charles Parker (1710–1722); Sidney Wortley-Montagu (1722–1727); Sir Edward O'Bryan, Bt (1727); Sidney Wortley-Montagu (1727–1728); Joseph Banks (1728) | Succeeded by Charles Gounter-Nicoll; Joseph Banks |
Peerage of Ireland
| Preceded by William Fitzwilliam | Earl Fitzwilliam; 1719–1728 | Succeeded by William Fitzwilliam |
