= John Mansfield (English politician) =

British trade unionist and politician

Mayor of Peterborough
- In office 1932–1933

Member of Peterborough City Council
- Incumbent
- Assumed office 1921

Personal details
- Born: 1889 Tottenham, London, England
- Died: 1970 (aged 80–81)
- Party: Labour
- Occupation: Engineer; Fitter; Trade unionist
- Awards: OBE

John Mansfield (1889–1970) was a British trade unionist and politician.

Born in Tottenham, Mansfield described himself as having attended the "borough polytechnic", before becoming an engineer and fitter. He relocated to Peterborough to work at Peter Brotherhood. While there he became active in the Amalgamated Society of Engineers (ASE), serving as its district secretary.

Mansfield was very active in the Labour Party, serving as honorary secretary of its Peterborough branch, and standing for election in the Peterborough constituency at the 1918, 1922, 1923 and 1924 United Kingdom general elections. On each occasion he took second place, with his best vote share being 41.0% in 1918.

In 1921, Mansfield was elected to Peterborough City Council, serving for many years as the chair of the Peterborough Joint Education Board. He was Mayor of Peterborough in 1932, and was made an Officer of the Order of the British Empire for his work. In the 1950s, John Mansfield School was named in his honour.
