= Hampden Whalley =

British politician and soldier

George Hampden Whalley, later George Hampden White (1851–1917) was a British Liberal Party politician and soldier.

The son of George Hammond Whalley, Member of Parliament (MP) for Peterborough, he was born at the family estate of Plas Madoc in 1851. Educated at Brighton College and on the training ship Britannia, he afterwards entered the Royal Navy.

Whalley received a lieutenant's commission in the 6th Royal Lancaster Regiment of Militia on 9 March 1871. He resigned his commission on 1 June 1872, and was commissioned a cornet in the Denbighshire Yeomanry on 29 June 1872. Whalley was promoted lieutenant, then captain on 4 December 1878. In 1879, Whalley commanded C Troop of Lonsdale's Horse, a local colonial unit, in the Anglo-Zulu War. A convoy under his command from Fort Tenedos to Fort Chelmsford successfully beat off a Zulu ambush.

Whalley was elected Liberal MP for Peterborough in 1880, like his father (who had occupied the seat until his death in 1878). He resigned by becoming Steward of the Manor of Northstead in June 1883. He was adjudged bankrupt later that year. In April 1884, Whalley and his wife rented a house in South Kensington. They were evicted in August, after Whalley's draft for the rent had proved uncollectable, but by this time Whalley had broken into a locked room and stolen £200 of the owner's goods and pawned them. He was subsequently convicted of theft at the Old Bailey and sentenced to nine months at hard labour. He subsequently changed his surname to White, and emigrated to Queensland, with his wife and infant daughter, in 1885 or 1886. He died in Innisfail, Queensland in 1917 aged 65.

Parliament of the United Kingdom
Preceded by Thomson Hankey; John Wentworth-FitzWilliam	Member of Parliament for Peterborough; 1880–1883; With: John Wentworth-FitzWilliam	Succeeded by John Wentworth-FitzWilliam; Sydney Buxton
