= Thomson Hankey =

British Merchant

Thomson Hankey (15 June 1805 – 13 January 1893) was a British merchant, a banker and a Liberal Party politician.

Hankey was the eldest son of Thomson Hankey senior from Portland Place in London, and his wife Martha, the daughter of Benjamin Harrison from Clapham Common. He became a merchant in his father's business in the City of London and a director of the Bank of England, serving first as its Deputy Governor and then as its Governor from 1851 to 1853. He married Apolline Agatha Alexander on 4 February 1831; she was the daughter of William Alexander and half-sister of Sir William Alexander.

He received compensation under the Slave Compensation Act 1837 for freed enslaved people for the Grenville Vale estate in Grenada. In June 2020 the Bank of England issued a public apology for the involvement of Hankey, amongst other employees, in the slave trade following the investigation by the Centre for the Study of the Legacies of British Slave-ownership at UCL.

At the 1852 general election, Hankey unsuccessfully contested the borough of Boston in Lincolnshire. He then contested the by-election in June 1853 for the City of Peterborough, where he lost by a margin of 21 votes (out of a total 451) to the Liberal George Hammond Whalley. Whalley had been returned for Peterborough at a by-election in December 1852, but an election petition was lodged and his election was subsequently declared void on 8 June 1853 on the grounds that Whalley had been complicit in the 'treating' of voters. After his second by-election win, a further petition was lodged, and a committee of the House of Commons found that Whalley's election was invalid, because he had been disqualified as a result of the previous void election. The seat was therefore awarded to Hankey, who was declared duly elected on 14 August 1853.

Hankey was re-elected in 1857, 1859 and 1865, but was defeated at the 1868 general election by the Liberal William Wells. He was re-elected in 1874, but was defeated in 1880. His name was discussed in early 1882 as a possible candidate for any future vacancy in Peterborough, but when Hampden Whalley resigned in June 1883, Hankey did not contest the resulting by-election, and did not stand again thereafter.

He was also a justice of the peace (JP) for Middlesex, Kent and the City of London, and a member of commission of lieutenancy for the City of London.

He died on 13 January 1893, aged 88. In his later years, his advanced age prevented him from taking any active part in public life.

== See also ==
- Lucy Weguelin

Parliament of the United Kingdom
Preceded by George Hammond Whalley; George Wentworth-FitzWilliam	Member of Parliament for Peterborough; 1853–1868; With: George Wentworth-FitzWilliam 1853–59; George Hammond Whalley 1859–68	Succeeded by William Wells; George Hammond Whalley
Preceded by William Wells; George Hammond Whalley	Member of Parliament for Peterborough; 1874–1880; With: George Hammond Whalley 1874–78; John Wentworth-FitzWilliam 1878–80	Succeeded by Hampden Whalley; John Wentworth-FitzWilliam
Government offices
Preceded by Henry James Prescot	Governor of the Bank of England; 1851–1853	Succeeded by John Hubbard
