= William FitzWilliam, 2nd Baron FitzWilliam =

English nobleman and politician

The Right Honourable The Lord FitzWilliam MP
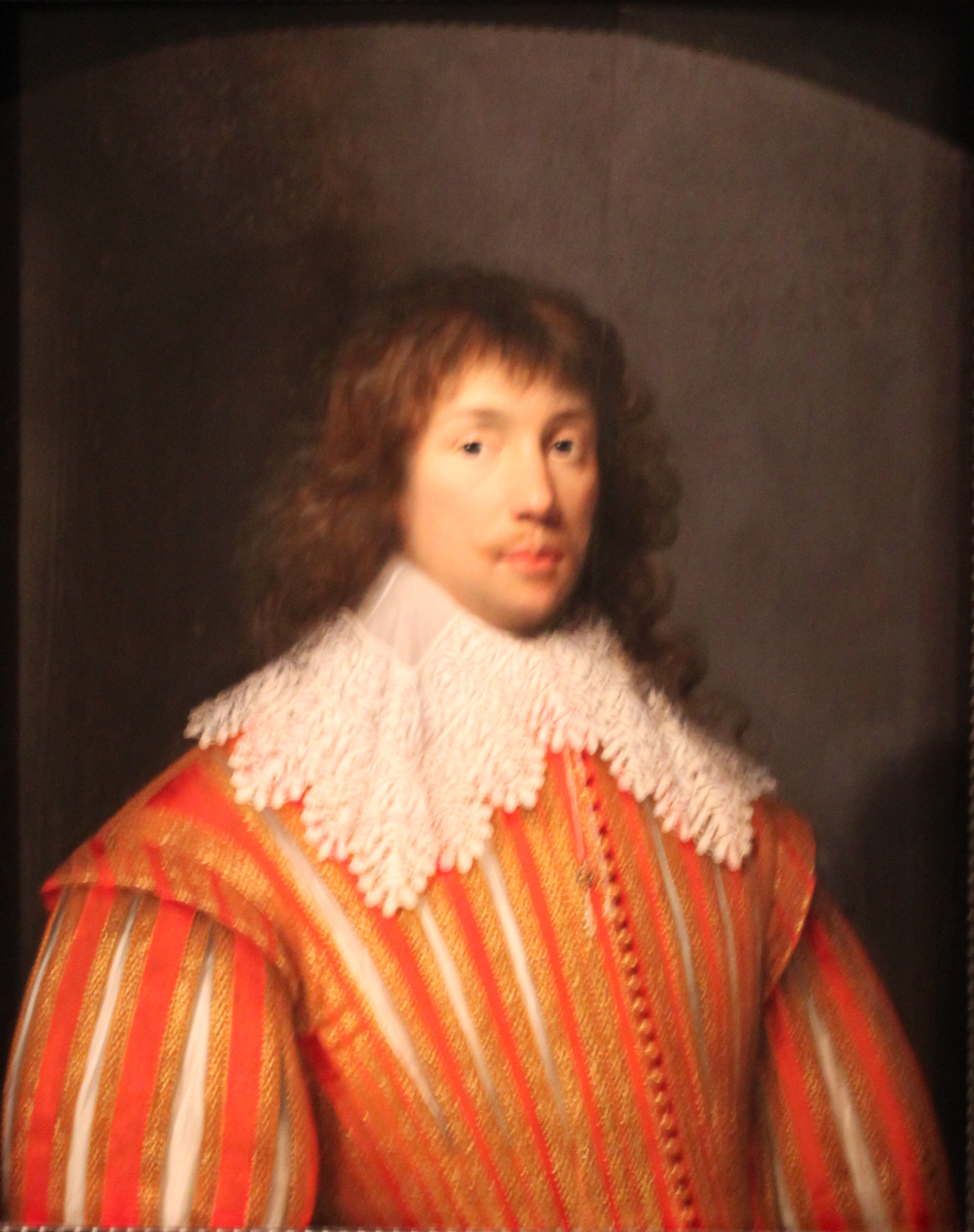
- William Fitzwilliam, Second Lord Fitzwilliam of Liffer, Cornelis Jonson, 1629, oil on wood panel, The Detroit Institute of Arts
- Born: c.1609
- Died: 21 February 1658 (age 49)
- Title: 2nd Baron Fitzwilliam
- Spouse: Jane Perry
- Children: 2 (JaneFitzWilliam William Fitzwilliam, 1st Earl Fitzwilliam)
- Parent(s): William Fitzwilliam, 1st Baron Fitzwilliam; Catherine Hyde

William Fitzwilliam, 2nd Baron Fitzwilliam MP (c.1609 – 21 February 1658) was an English nobleman and politician who sat in the House of Commons of England between 1640 and 1653.

Fitzwilliam was the son of William Fitzwilliam, 1st Baron Fitzwilliam (1577–1643) and his wife Catherine Hyde (1574–1643).

In April 1640, Fitzwilliam was elected Member of Parliament for Peterborough in the Short Parliament. He was re-elected in November 1640 for the Long Parliament where he remained throughout its duration. Fitzwilliam inherited the peerage on the death of his father in 1643.

Fitzwilliam died at the age of 49.

On 11 Jul 1638 Fitzwilliam married Jane Hunter Perry (1611 – 8 April 1671), daughter of Hugh Perry and his wife Catherine Fenn. Their son William succeeded to the title and was later created Earl Fitzwilliam. Their daughter Jane FitzWilliam (1646–1679) married Sir Christopher Wren.

Parliament of England
Parliament suspended since 1629	Member of Parliament for Peterborough; 1640–1653; With: David Cecil; Sir Robert Napier, 2nd Baronet	Not represented in Barebones Parliament
Peerage of Ireland
Preceded by William Fitzwilliam	Baron Fitzwilliam; 1643–1658	Succeeded by William Fitzwilliam
