= 1943 Peterborough by-election =

UK by-election

The 1943 Peterborough by-election was held on 15 October 1943. The by-election was held due to the appointment as Governor of Bermuda of the incumbent Conservative MP, Lord Burghley. It was won by the Conservative candidate John Hely-Hutchinson.

Peterborough by-election, 1943 Electorate 47,947
Party	Candidate	Votes	%	±%
Conservative	John Hely-Hutchinson	11,976	52.4	−4.2
Independent Labour	Samuel Bennett	10,890	47.6	New
Majority		1,086	4.8	−8.4
Turnout		22,866		
Conservative hold		Swing		
