= David Orme =

British writer

David Orme is a children's writer and poet from England. He has written or edited more than 250 books. His recent work has been specifically aimed at reluctant readers or children with learning difficulties and includes the Boffin Boy, a series of manga-style graphic novels. Orme lives in Winchester, Hampshire, England and was the chair of the Education Writers Group of the Society of Authors. With Helen Orme he has volunteered to assist in literacy programs. He was director of the Schools Poetry Association (SPA).

== Book reviews ==
- McKenzie, John. "Discover Earth's Secrets: How our Planet was Formed, Shaped and Continuously Changes." Reading Time. Nov 2012, Vol. 56 Issue 4, p42-42. Abstract: The article reviews the book "Discover Earth's Secrets: How Our Planet Was Formed, Shaped and Continuously Changes," by David Orme and Helen Orme.
- Wildner, Kristine. "Space Launch!" Library Media Connection. Nov2007, Vol. 26 Issue 3, p90-90. Abstract: The article reviews several books including "Let's Explore Comets and Asteroids," "Let's Explore Earth," and "Let's Explore the Moon," by Helen Orme and David Orme.
- Glantz, Shelley. "Billy Blaster." Library Media Connection. Oct2009, Vol. 28 Issue 2, p77-77. Abstract: The article reviews several books by David Orme, including "Billy Blaster," "Ice Caves of Pluto" and "Mind Thief."
- Goldstein, Lisa. "Ice Caves of Pluto/Mind Thief." School Library Journal. May2009, Vol. 55 Issue 5, p135-135. Abstract: The article presents reviews of the books "Ice Caves of Pluto" and "Mind Thief," both by David Orme.
- "Keystone Books." Library Media Connection. Oct2006, Vol. 25 Issue 2, p70-70. Abstract: The article reviews the book "Keystone Books: Space Pirates," by David Orme.
- Manning, Patricia. "Giant Panda/Orangutan/Asian Elephant." School Library Journal. Aug2005, Vol. 51 Issue 8, p142-142. Abstract: Reviews several books. "Giant Panda," by Anna Claybourne; "Orangutan," by David Orme; "Asian Elephant," by Matt Turner.
- Mark, Jan. "Are you spooking me?" Times Educational Supplement. 1/14/2005, Issue 4617, TES first appointments p54-54. Abstract: Reviews several books for children. "A Gift for the King," by Damian Harvey; "The Thirsty Moose," by David Orme; "The Story House," by Vivian French; Others.
- Harcombe, Kevin. "Write from the start." Times Educational Supplement. 9/26/2003, Issue 4551, TES Teacher p26-27. Abstract: Reviews several books for children. 'Grammar for Literacy,' by David Orme; 'Improving Literacy: Creative Approaches,' by Alan Peat; 'Key to Writing,' by Christine Moorcroft and Les Ray Letts; 'Write Away!,' Huw Jones and Adelaide Kelly.
- Scott, Angel. "Net English (Book Review)." Times Educational Supplement. 05/25/2001, Issue 4430, English p17. Abstract: Reviews the book 'net English,' by David Orme and James Sale.
- Clarke, Gillian. "Early delights." Times Educational Supplement. 01/16/98, Issue 4255, TES Friday p15. Abstract: Reviews a number of books which includes 'Anthology for the Earth,' edited by Judy Allen, 'Dear Future: Time Capsule of Poems,' selected by David Orme, 'Say That Again,' edited by Mairwen Jones and John Spink et al.
