= The Oude Stadhuis in Amsterdam =

1657 painting by Pieter Jansz. Saenredam

The Old Town Hall of Amsterdam
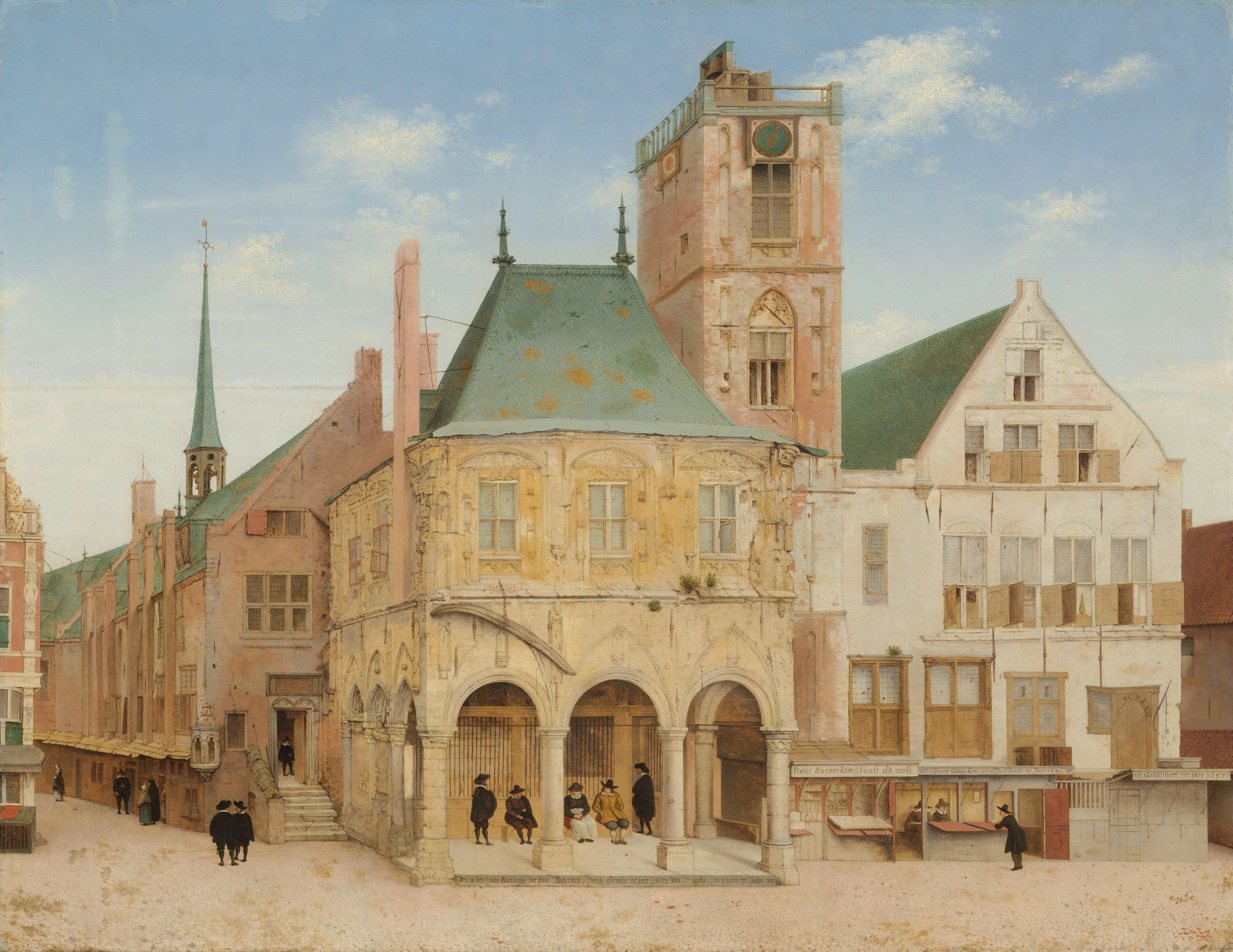
- Artist: Pieter Jansz. Saenredam
- Year: 1657
- Medium: oil paint, panel
- Dimensions: 65.5 cm (25.8 in) × 84.5 cm (33.3 in)
- Location: Rijksmuseum
- Owner: Government of Amsterdam
- Accession: SK-C-1409, SA 8361

The Oude Stadhuis in Amsterdam is a 1657 painting by Pieter Jansz. Saenredam, based on a drawing he made of the Old Town Hall on Dam Square over six days in 1641 before its demolition. It was bought from the painter in 1658 for 300 guilders by the mayor of Amsterdam for his office in the New Town Hall. It is now in the city's Rijksmuseum.

== Sources ==
- https://www.rijksmuseum.nl/nl/collectie/SK-C-1409
