= Dennis Orme =

Reverend Dennis Frederick Orme

Personal details
- Born: 17 June 1938 Bedford, England
- Education: Bedford Modern School
- Alma mater: University of Hull; Harvard University

Dennis Frederick Orme (born 17 June 1938) is a former leader of Unification Churches in England, theologian and author. Orme and his wife were among the earliest Western followers of the Unification Church, and he is perhaps best known for his unsuccessful personal lawsuit for libel against Associated Newspapers Group. At that time, at $1.6m, it was the longest and most expensive libel case in British history.

== Life ==
Orme was born in Bedford in 1938. He was educated at Bedford Modern School and HMS Conway where he served as a cadet, midshipman and later navigating officer having obtained his Second Mates Foreign-Going Certificate at twenty years of age.

Orme’s travels in China, Japan, Malaya and other far eastern countries led to a deep fascination with the Orient. In his spare time he devoted himself to the study of philosophy and psychology, eventually leaving the Navy to study at the University of Hull before joining the Unification Church where he was one of the earliest Western born followers. Following a meeting with Sun Myung Moon he later became head of Unification Churches in England, and an author on theological matters.

In 1978 the Daily Mail published an article about the Unification Church claiming that it was ‘the church that breaks up families’. Orme issued legal proceedings against the Associated Newspaper Group, owner of the Daily Mail, for libel and the case went to the High Court in 1980. Although a jury trial involving 100 witnesses held that the article was not libellous, the Unification Church appealed the decision which was eventually upheld in the Court of Appeal. The Unification Church was ordered to pay one million pounds in costs and the Inland Revenue were instructed to investigate the tax-free status of the Church.

After the lawsuit, Orme moved to New York City where he worked in publishing as a Director of News World Communications, a position he held for eight years. He was also an adviser to the Collegiate Association for the Research of Principles in the United States and, during his time in the US, earned a Master's degree from Harvard University, majoring in Government.

Orme married Doris Barbara (née Walder) of New Jersey who was also a Reverend in the Unification Church. In 2014, after a split with Sun Myung Moon, the couple moved to Orme's hometown of Bedford in England. Doris Orme worked for the church in Italy, England, California, Washington DC and contributed to the church's One World Crusade. Doris Orme died in Bedford on 28 April 2016 having suffered from Alzheimer's disease over a number of years. Despite parting from the church some 24 years previously, the Unification Church offered their condolences describing her as a 'spiritual pioneer'.

== Selected works ==
- Orme, Dennis F. (1999). The golden age of the seventh millennium. Living God Publications. ISBN 978-0-9582156-0-2. OCLC 45237723.
- Orme, Dennis F (1975). A Christian manifesto for our land. Federation for World Peace and Unification. ISBN 978-0-905307-00-8. OCLC 2543087.
