= John Wentworth-FitzWilliam =

British politician (1852–1889)

The Honourable William John Wentworth-FitzWilliam (7 August 1852 – 11 September 1889), was a British Liberal and Liberal Unionist politician.

Wentworth-FitzWilliam was the fifth son of William Wentworth-FitzWilliam, 6th Earl FitzWilliam, and his wife Lady Frances Harriet, daughter of George Douglas, 17th Earl of Morton. William Wentworth Fitzwilliam, Viscount Milton, was his elder brother and William Wentworth-FitzWilliam, 7th Earl FitzWilliam, his nephew. He entered Parliament for Peterborough in 1878, a seat he held until his death.

Wentworth-FitzWilliam died at Wentworth house in September 1889, aged 37, after he was thrown from his horse.

== See also ==
- Earl FitzWilliam

Parliament of the United Kingdom
Preceded by George Hammond Whalley; Thomson Hankey	Member of Parliament for Peterborough; 1878–1889; With: Thomson Hankey 1878–1880; Hampden Whalley 1880–1883; Sydney Buxton 1883–1885	Succeeded by Alpheus Morton
