= William Fitzwilliam, 3rd Earl Fitzwilliam =

British peer

The Earl FitzWilliam
- 3rd Earl Fitzwilliam
- Predecessor: John Fitzwilliam, 2nd Earl Fitzwilliam
- Successor: William Fitzwilliam, 4th Earl Fitzwilliam
- Born: 15 January 1720
- Died: 10 August 1756 (aged 36); Marholm
- Spouse: Lady Anne Watson-Wentworth
- Issue: 8 (including Lady Charlotte Fitzwilliam and William Fitzwilliam, 4th Earl Fitzwilliam)
- Parents: John Fitzwilliam, 2nd Earl Fitzwilliam

William Fitzwilliam, 3rd Earl Fitzwilliam (15 January 1719/1720 – 10 August 1756) was a British peer, nobleman, and politician.

== Biography ==
William Fitzwilliam was the son of John Fitzwilliam, 2nd Earl Fitzwilliam by his wife Anne, daughter of John Stringer of Sutton cum Lound, Nottinghamshire. His sister Anne was the second wife of Francis Godolphin, 2nd Baron Godolphin.

He succeeded his father as third Earl Fitzwilliam in the Peerage of Ireland on 28 August 1728. He was elected Member of Parliament for Peterborough on 4 May 1741, and sat until he was created Baron Fitzwilliam in the Peerage of Great Britain on 19 April 1742. He was made a Member of the Irish Privy Council on 6 June 1746, and further created Earl Fitzwilliam in the Peerage of Great Britain on 6 September 1746.

=== Marriage and issue ===
On 22 June 1744 at St George's, Hanover Square, Fitzwilliam married Lady Anne Watson-Wentworth, daughter of the Earl of Malton. Lord Malton was later created Marquess of Rockingham; Lady Anne's brother was the future Prime Minister Charles Watson-Wentworth. The Fitzwilliams had two sons and six daughters:

- Lady Anne (23 March 1745 – 8 December 1819);
- Lady Charlotte (14 July 1746 – 11 February 1833), married on 24 May 1764 to Thomas Dundas, 1st Baron Dundas and had issue;
- William Fitzwilliam, 4th Earl Fitzwilliam (30 May 1748 – 8 February 1833);
- Lady Frances Henrietta (22 October 1750 – 28 October 1835);
- Lady Amelia Maria (12 December 1751 – 8 August 1752);
- Lady Henrietta (20 March 1753 – );
- Lady Dorothy (22 May 1754 – 16 March 1809);
- George Fitzwilliam (28 February 1756 – May 1786).

Fitzwilliam died at Marholm at the age of thirty-six and was succeeded as Earl by his son William. His widow died on 29 August 1769.

Peerage of Great Britain
New creation	Earl Fitzwilliam; 1746–1756	Succeeded by William Fitzwilliam
New creation	Baron Fitzwilliam; 1742–1756	Succeeded by William Fitzwilliam
Peerage of Ireland
Preceded by John Fitzwilliam	Earl Fitzwilliam; 1728–1756	Succeeded by William Fitzwilliam
