= George Hammond Whalley =

British lawyer and politician (1813-1878)

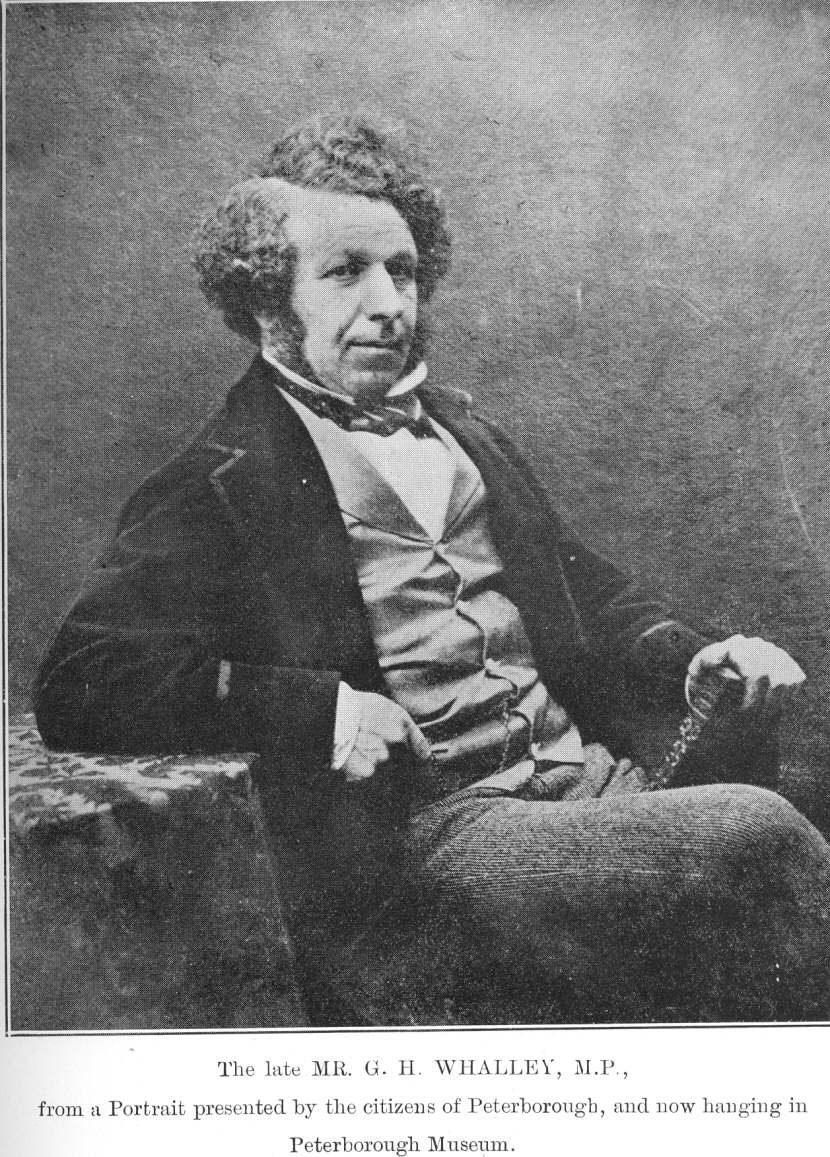
- Photograph of either G.H. Whalley MP or a portrait of his

Member of Parliament for Peterborough
- In office 1852–1853 Serving with George Wentworth-FitzWilliam
- Preceded by: Richard Watson; George Wentworth-FitzWilliam
- Succeeded by: Thomson Hankey; George Wentworth-FitzWilliam

Member of Parliament for Peterborough
- In office 1859–1878 Serving with Thomson Hankey (1859-1868); William Wells (1868–1874); Thomson Hankey (1874-1878)
- Preceded by: Thomson Hankey; George Wentworth-FitzWilliam
- Succeeded by: John Wentworth-FitzWilliam; Thomson Hankey

Personal details
- Born: 22 January 1813 Gloucester, Gloucestershire, England
- Died: 8 October 1878 (aged 65)
- Party: Liberal
- Spouse: Anne Wakeford (m. 1846)
- Children: 3
- Parent: James Whalley (father)
- Relatives: George Hampden Whalley (son)
- Education: University College London

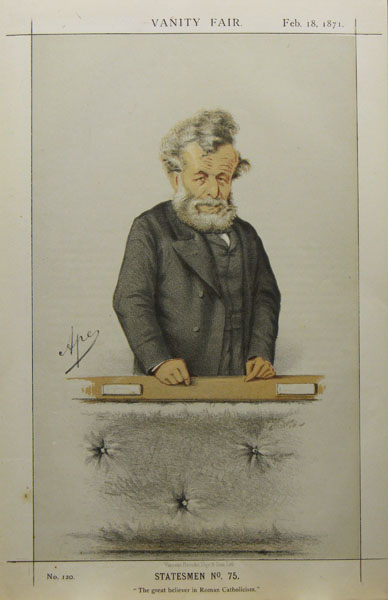
"The great believer in Roman Catholicism" Whalley as caricatured by Ape (Carlo Pellegrini) in Vanity Fair, February 1871

George Hammond Whalley (22 January 1813 – 8 October 1878) was a British lawyer and Liberal Party politician. He became chairman of the Llanidloes and Newtown Railway.

== Biography ==
He was the eldest son of James Whalley, a merchant and banker from Gloucester, and a direct descendant of Edward Whalley, the regicide. George was educated at University College London, gaining a first class degree in Metaphysics and Rhetoric. He entered Gray's Inn in 1835, and was called to the bar in 1839.

He was an assistant tithe commissioner between 1836 and 1847, writing over 200 articles for the Justice of the Peace between 1838 and 1842. In 1838 and 1839 he published a pair of treatises on the Tithe Acts, which were expanded and published in 1848 as The Tithe Act and the Whole of the Tithe Amendment Acts.

In 1846, he married Anne Wakeford, with whom he had a son and two daughters. During the Great Famine in 1847, he established several fisheries on the Irish west coast. In 1852 he was made Sheriff of Caernarvonshire, a deputy lieutenant of Denbighshire, and a captain in the Denbighshire Yeomanry.

He was chairman of the Llanidloes and Newtown Railway, the first in Montgomeryshire, from its inception in 1852 and was the first chairman of the Mid-Wales Railway in 1859. He was also active in the Railway Benevolent Institution and the National Temperance League.

== Parliamentary career ==
He unsuccessfully stood for Parliament at the 1852 general election in Montgomery, and was returned to Parliament on his second attempt at a by-election in December 1852 for the City of Peterborough. There were reports of irregularities in the election, which had been heavily influenced by Earl Fitzwilliam, and his election was voided on 8 June 1853. A second by-election was held on 25 June 1853, when Whalley was re-elected. Another election petition was lodged, and a Committee of the House of Commons was established in July 1853 to investigate the case. The committee determined that he had not been legitimately elected, and reinstated his opponent, Thomson Hankey. He was once again elected, however, in the 1859 general election.

An Anglican, Whalley was persuaded to lead the parliamentary campaign against Roman Catholicism, taking over from the ailing Richard Spooner. His principal aim was to abolish the Maynooth Grant, claiming that Britain was paying for the creation of Catholic priests whose goal was to turn Britain into a "citadel of Popery". His three motions for the creation of a committee to consider repeal of the grant were all defeated in 1861, 1862, and 1863, and he experienced difficulty in getting his anti-Catholic speeches heard due to opposition from the numerous Irish MPs.

In 1866 he claimed to have evidence that Vatican machinations had caused the defeat of British troops in New Zealand, that Cardinal Cullen, the Irish primate, intended to place a Stuart pretender on the throne of England, and that the Pope had taken control of the British artillery corps, the police, the telegraph office, and railway companies. He was also a zealous supporter of Arthur Orton, the notorious Tichborne Claimant, and was eventually jailed by Lord Chief Justice Cockburn, who tried the case, for contempt of court.

He died insolvent in 1878, still in office. His son, George Hampden Whalley, was MP for Peterborough between 1880 and 1883.

Parliament of the United Kingdom
Preceded by Richard Watson; George Wentworth-FitzWilliam	Member of Parliament for Peterborough; 1852–1853; With: George Wentworth-FitzWilliam	Succeeded by Thomson Hankey; George Wentworth-FitzWilliam
Preceded by Thomson Hankey; George Wentworth-FitzWilliam	Member of Parliament for Peterborough; 1859–1878; With: Thomson Hankey to 1868; William Wells 1868–1874; Thomson Hankey from 1874	Succeeded by John Wentworth-FitzWilliam; Thomson Hankey
Honorary titles
Preceded by Martin Williams	High Sheriff of Caernarvonshire; 1852	Succeeded by Robert Vaughan Wynne Williams
