= Christine Orme =

American physicist

Christine A. Orme is an American physicist who studies the growth and decay of materials at surfaces, especially focusing on biomineralization. She is a Senior Staff Scientist at the Lawrence Livermore National Laboratory, working in the BioNanomaterials Group of the Physical and Life Sciences Directorate.

== Education and career ==
Orme majored in physics at the University of California, Berkeley, graduating in 1986. She completed her Ph.D. in 1995 at the University of Michigan, working there with Bradford Orr.

After completing her Ph.D. she became a postdoctoral researcher at the Lawrence Livermore National Laboratory, and continued there as a staff researcher.

== Recognition ==
Orme was a 2002 winner of the Presidential Early Career Award for Scientists and Engineers. She was elected as a Fellow of the American Physical Society (APS) in 2009, after a nomination from the APS Division of Materials Physics, "for her outstanding contributions in understanding the fundamental physics of crystallization and materials assembly with application to biomineralizaion, biomimetic synthesis, and shape control of nanostructures". In 2010 she was given the Department of Energy Outstanding Mentor Award.
