= Humphrey Orme =

English politician

Humphrey Orme (1620 – 2 March 1671) was an English politician who sat in the House of Commons in 1654 and from 1660 to 1671.

Orme was the son of Humphrey Orme of Peterborough and his wife Mary Orme, daughter of Humphrey Orme of Compton Dundon, Somerset. He was baptised on 12 October 1620.

Orme's grandfather was a strong Royalist. Nevertheless, Orme supported Parliament, being in 1650 one Commissioners for raising money in Northamptonshire. In 1654, he was elected Member of Parliament for Peterborough in the First Protectorate Parliament.

In 1660, Orme was re-elected MP for Peterborough in the Convention Parliament. He was recommended as a Knight of the Royal Oak. He was re-elected in 1661 for the Cavalier Parliament and sat until his death in 1671.

Orme died at the age of 50.

Orme married Mary Apreece, widow of Robert Apreece and daughter of Sir Henry Bedingfield, 1st Baronet of Oxburgh, Norfolk.

Parliament of England
Preceded by Not represented in Barebones Parliament	Member of Parliament for Peterborough; 1654; With: Alexander Blake	Succeeded by Alexander Blake; Francis St John
