= Francis St John =

English lawyer and politician

Francis St John (1634 – 29 July 1705) was an English lawyer and politician who sat in the House of Commons at various times between 1654 and 1698.

St John was the eldest son of Oliver St John of Keysoe, Bedfordshire, and Thorpe Hall, Northamptonshire, and his first wife Joanna Altham, daughter of Sir James Altham of Markshall, Latton, Essex. He was educated at Oundle School and admitted at Emmanuel College, Cambridge on 21 July 1648 and at Lincoln's Inn on 14 November 1648.

In October 1654, St John was elected Member of Parliament for Tewkesbury in a by-election for the First Protectorate Parliament, although apparently he never took his seat. He was called to the bar in 1656 and was elected MP for Peterborough for the Second Protectorate Parliament. He was commissioner for trade from 1656 to 1657, commissioner for charitable uses at Peterborough in 1656 and feoffee for town lands from 1656 to 1683. In 1657 he was commissioner for assessment for Northamptonshire and became J.P. for Peterborough from 1657 to October 1660. In 1659 he was commissioner for militia for Essex. He was elected MP for Peterborough again in 1659 for the Third Protectorate Parliament. In March 1660 he was commissioner for assessment for Northamptonshire in and was then elected MP for Peterborough in the Convention Parliament, but was there were serious irregularities with the poll and he was unseated in May 1660.

At the Stuart Restoration, St John's father was deprived of civic rights and fled abroad in 1662. St John was conservator for the Bedford level from 1666 to 1667, but took little part in politics until 1679. He was a historian and built up a library of history books at his home at Thorpe Hall in Longthorpe, Peterborough. He was elected MP for Peterborough again in the two parliaments of 1679. He was commissioner for assessment for Northamptonshire from 1679 to 1680. He was re-elected MP for Peterborough in 1681 and in 1698. By 1701 he was JP for Northamptonshire and Peterborough.

St John died at the age of 60 and was buried in St John the Baptist Church, Peterborough.

St John married firstly Mary Wakering, daughter of Dionise Wakering of Wakering Hall, Essex and had a son. He married secondly by licence issued on 14 May 1674, Mary Forth, daughter of Dannet Forth, brewer of London and had three sons and a daughter.

Parliament of England
Preceded by Sir Anthony Ashley Cooper	Member of Parliament for Tewkesbury; 1654	Succeeded by Francis White
Preceded by Alexander Blake	Member of Parliament for Peterborough; 1656–1659; With: Alexander Blake	Succeeded by Not represented in Restored Rump
