= Charles Orme =

British film producer

- Born: Charles Reginald Orme; 13 August 1918; Conway, Caernarfonshire Wales
- Died: 9 May 2007 (aged 88); Chalfont St Giles, Buckinghamshire, England
- Occupation: Film producer
- Spouse(s): Vivienne Knight (1950–53), Brenda Harper (1960-2007)
- Children: Nicholas Orme, Toby Orme
- Family: Nathan Orme (grandson); Cameron Orme (grandson)

Charles Orme (13 August 1918 – 9 May 2007) was a British film producer. He worked regularly with Powell & Pressburger, Ralph Thomas, Basil Dearden and John Boorman. He has over 50 credits on a number of classics including The 39 Steps (1959), Khartoum (1966), Deliverance (1972), The Man with the Golden Gun (1974) and The Omen (1976). He was an original member of the multiple-award-winning Powell & Pressburger production team known as The Archers. He was a production assistant, production manager and assistant director on many of their classic productions, including The Red Shoes (1948), The Small Back Room (1949), Gone to Earth (1950) and The Elusive Pimpernel (1950), The Tales of Hoffmann (1951), Oh... Rosalinda!! (1955), The Battle of the River Plate (1956) and Ill Met by Moonlight (1957).

== Early years ==
Orme was born in Conway, Wales. He was one of four children with sisters Vanda, Daphne, and Wendy Orme. His parents were Edward Reginald Orme, British Army Major, and Jessie May Allen.

== Film career ==
On 29 March 1947, Emeric Pressburger married Orme's sister Wendy Orme, and they later had a daughter, Angela. Angela had two sons, both of whom became successful film-makers: Kevin Macdonald an Oscar-winning director whose work includes the documentaries One Day in September (1999), Touching the Void (2003) and Marley (2012), as well as feature films The Last King of Scotland (2006) and Black Sea (2014). Andrew Macdonald is a film producer and co-founder of DNA Films whose work has included films such as Shallow Grave (1994), Trainspotting (1996), 28 Days Later (2002) and Ex Machina (2015).

In 1947, when he was 29, his brother-in-law Emeric Pressburger introduced him to a career in the film industry which was to span the next 38 years. Orme was a member of the legendary production company The Archers, which is renowned for making films such as 49th Parallel (1941), The Life and Death of Colonel Blimp (1943), A Matter of Life and Death (1946), Black Narcissus (1947), The Red Shoes (1948) and The Tales of Hoffmann (1951).

=== The Archers and Powell and Pressburger ===
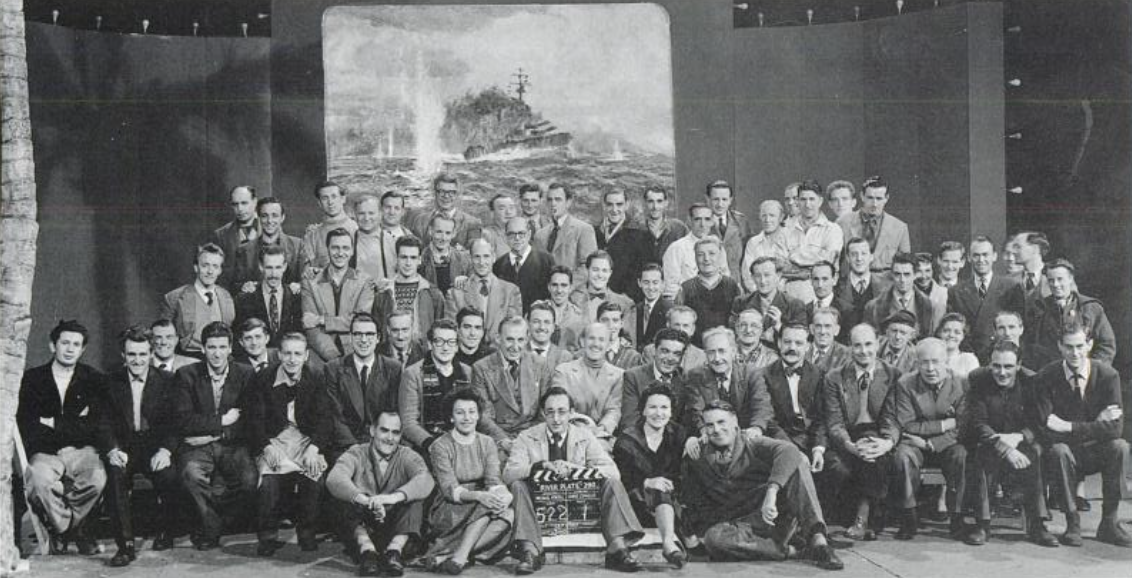
The Archers Crew - 1956 - The Battle of the River Plate

From 1947 to 1957, Orme learned his trade working as part of The Archers' production team on eight Powell & Pressburger films:

- The Red Shoes (1948) as production assistant
- The Small Back Room (1949) as production assistant
- The Elusive Pimpernel (1950) as production assistant
- Gone to Earth (1950) as unit production manager and location manager
- The Tales of Hoffmann (1951) as unit production manager
- Oh... Rosalinda!! (1955) as production manager
- The Battle of the River Plate (1956) as 1st assistant director
- Ill Met by Moonlight (1957) as 1st assistant director

Additional films (with Emeric Pressburger only):

- Twice Upon a Time (1953) as unit production manager
- Miracle in Soho (1957) as production manager

Also in 1951 he worked as unit and location manager on Warners Bros' Where's Charley? directed by David Butler and starring Ray Bolger (The Wizard of Oz).

In 1952, Orme worked as production manager on the first full-length feature film made by Billy Graham in England, Souls in Conflict, directed by Dick Ross and Leonard Reeve, photographed by cinematographer Guy Green (Great Expectations (1946), Oliver Twist (1948)). Orme also worked as production manager on Meines Vaters Pferde, a German film made partly in Ireland, directed by Gerhard Lamprecht and starring Curt Jurgens (The Spy Who Loved Me).

=== Rank Organisation ===
From 1956 to 1964, Orme was placed under contract with the Rank Organisation as a production manager, where he regularly worked with directors Ralph Thomas, Basil Dearden, John Paddy Carstairs and Robert Asher as well as producers such as Betty E. Box, Earl St. John, Hugh Stewart and Michael Relph on another 22 films, including films as diverse as The 39 Steps, several Norman Wisdom and Doctor films and The Intelligence Men with Morecambe and Wise.

As production manager on:

- Just My Luck (1957)
- Innocent Sinners (1958)
- The Wind Cannot Read (1958)
- The Square Peg (1958)
- The 39 Steps (1959)
- Upstairs and Downstairs (1959)
- Follow a Star (1959)
- The League of Gentlemen (1960)
- Doctor in Love (1960)
- No Love for Johnnie (1961)
- Flame in the Streets (1961)
- No My Darling Daughter (1961)
- A Pair of Briefs (1962)
- In the Doghouse (1962)
- Life for Ruth (1962)
- The Wild and the Willing (1962)
- The Mind Benders (1963)
- Doctor in Distress (1963)
- The Informers (1963)
- Woman of Straw (1964)
- The High Bright Sun (1964)
- The Intelligence Men (1965)

=== 1965–1969: Freelance: Khartoum ===
In 1965, Orme moved into being a freelance production supervisor for Khartoum, directed by Basil Dearden, produced by Julian Blaustein and starring Charlton Heston, Laurence Olivier, Ralph Richardson and Richard Johnson.

In 1968, he worked as a production supervisor on Inspector Clouseau, directed by Bud Yorkin, starring Alan Arkin, Frank Finlay and Delia Boccardo.

In 1969, Orme moved from being a production supervisor to associate producer to reunite with director Basil Dearden on The Assassination Bureau, edited by Teddy Darvas, photographed by cinematographer Geoffrey Unsworth and starring Oliver Reed, Diana Rigg, Telly Savalas and Curt Jurgens.

=== 1969–1970: Development and pre-production work ===
During 1969 and 1970, Orme worked on development and pre-production work for the following 18 projects:

For Paramount Pictures:

- Homo Faber (Anthony Mann)
- Because of the Cats
- A Day at the Beach (Roman Polanski)

For Robert Chartoff & Irwin Winkler:

- Rosencrantz & Guildenstern are Dead
- A Cry of Whiteness
- Single

For Universal Studios:

- William the Conqueror (Thomas Clyde)
- Officer Factory

For Warner Brothers:

- Private Navy (Clarke Reynolds, Ornstein)
- Julie in Love (Pigott-Brown, Ornstein)
- Red Sun (Ted Richmond, Terence Young)
- Out of Africa (Julian Blaustein)

For United Artists:

- I Hear America (John Boorman)
- Labour of Love
- Lord of the Rings (John Boorman)
- Life of Maria Callas

For MGM:

- The Last Run (John Boorman)

For Michael Relph & Basil Dearden:

- Genesis 2000

In 1969, Orme worked as a Paramount production executive in Denmark on A Day at the Beach (1972) with producers Gene Gutowski and Roman Polanski. The film was directed by Simon Hesera and starred Peter Sellers, Mark Burns, Beatie Edney and Maurice Roëves.

In the same year, he also worked as a post-production supervisor on Performance, produced by Sanford Lieberson and David Cammell. The film was directed by both Nicolas Roeg and Donald Cammell and starred Mick Jagger, James Fox and Anita Pallenberg.

== 1970–1985: Later career ==
Orme with John Boorman

In February 1970, Orme joined John Boorman as his associate and became a director of Christel Films and John Boorman Productions Limited. This relationship saw him working on a number of productions with Boorman.

In 1971, Orme began working as associate producer on Deliverance (adapted from James Dickey's novel), directed by John Boorman, edited by Tom Priestley and starring Jon Voight, Burt Reynolds, Ned Beatty and Ronny Cox. The film was a box office success in the United States, becoming the fifth highest-grossing film of 1972 after grossing a domestic total of over $46 million with only a $2 million budget. It was nominated for three Oscars, including Best Picture, Best Director and Best Film Editing. Deliverance was an inductee to the 2008 National Film Registry list; which commented, "With dazzling visual flair, director John Boorman and cinematographer Vilmos Zsigmond infuse James Dickey's novel with scenes of genuine terror and frantic struggles for survival battling river rapids — and in the process create a work rich with fascinating ambiguities about "civilized" values, urban-versus-backwoods culture, nature, and man's supposed taming of the environment."

In 1972, Orme worked for one year as production executive with Clive Parsons' Film and General Investments and Completion Guarantee Company.

In 1973, Orme reunited with John Boorman as associate producer for Zardoz, edited by John Merritt, photographed by cinematographer Geoffrey Unsworth and starring Sean Connery, Charlotte Rampling and Sara Kestelman.

In 1974, Orme began working as associate producer for United Artists on The Man with the Golden Gun, the ninth film in the James Bond series, directed by Guy Hamilton and starring Roger Moore, Christopher Lee and Britt Ekland.

In 1975, Orme worked as associate producer for 20th Century Fox on The Adventure of Sherlock Holmes' Smarter Brother, edited by Jim Clark, starring Gene Wilder (also writer and director), Madeleine Kahn, Marty Feldman, Dom DeLuise, Roy Kinnear and John Le Mesurier.

In 1976, Orme worked as associate producer with producer Harvey Bernhard and executive producer Mace Neufeld on The Omen, directed by Richard Donner, edited by Stuart Baird and starring Gregory Peck. This is considered by many as one of the best films of 1976, as well as one of the best horror films ever made. The film was a massive commercial success in the United States. It grossed $4.3m in its opening weekend and $60.9m domestically on a relatively small budget of $2.8m. The film was the fifth highest-grossing movie of 1976 and won an Academy Award for Best Original Score (awarded to the film's composer Jerry Goldsmith, his only Oscar, having been nominated no less than eighteen times).

In the same year, Orme worked as associate producer on John Boorman's Exorcist II: The Heretic, edited by Tom Priestley, photographed by cinematographer William A. Fraker and starring Linda Blair, Louise Fletcher and Richard Burton. The film's music was composed by another of the great film composers of all time, Ennio Morricone.

In 1977–78, Orme worked as co-producer on Damien: Omen II, the second installment in The Omen series and was reunited again with producers Harvey Bernhard and Mace Neufeld. The film was directed by Don Taylor and starred William Holden, Lee Grant and Jonathan Scott-Taylor.

Orme remained in close contact throughout his career with Harvey Bernhard, Mace Neufeld and Zvi Spielmann after having collaborated with them previously on The Omen and/or Damien: Omen II.

In 1979, Orme worked on John Boorman's Excalibur for seven months in its pre-production stage.

In 1980, Orme worked as associate producer on Outland with producer Richard A. Roth (Blue Velvet) and executive producer Stanley O'Toole. The film was directed by Peter Hyams and starred Sean Connery, Peter Boyle, Frances Sternhagen and James Sikking. The film was nominated for an Academy Award for Best Sound.

In 1981, Orme worked as associate producer on the film version of Brimstone and Treacle with executive producer Naim Attallah and producers Alan E. Salke, Herbert F. Solow and Kenith Trodd. The film was directed by Richard Loncraine and starred Sting and Denholm Elliott.

In 1982–85, Orme worked as associate producer on King David with producer Martin Elfand. The film was directed by Bruce Beresford (Driving Miss Daisy) and starred Richard Gere, Edward Woodward, Alice Krige and Cherie Lunghi.

Orme also worked as a European production supervisor for Paramount Pictures, a troubleshooter for Warner Brothers and was also resident expert on production problems with Film and General Investments.

== Personal life ==
On 14 January 1950, Orme married Vivienne Knight, screenwriter and author who worked as the director of publicity for Powell and Pressburger on 12 films from 1943 to 1955. On 14 July 1953 Orme and Vivienne divorced. In 1966, Vivienne married Patrick Campbell, 3rd Baron Glenavy.

On 20 March 1960, Orme married his wife of 47 years, Brenda Anne Harper, a fashion model known for her stylish and sophisticated appearance who was photographed by the likes of Norman Parkinson and Terence Donovan notably for publications such as Vogue and Harper's Bazaar. Filmmaker Emeric Pressburger and model Ingrid Walker were present at the marriage.

Orme lived with his brother-in-law Emeric Pressburger in the late 1940s and early 1950s at 70 Redington Road in Hampstead. Orme and Emeric often spent evenings in the study at No.70 in almost complete silence (maybe with some music playing) sipping beer or slivovitz and enjoying each other's silence.

On 9 May 2007, Orme died at his home in Chalfont St Giles, Buckinghamshire. He was survived by his wife of 47 years Brenda; his children, Nicholas and Toby; and his grandchildren, Nathan and Cameron.

Terrence A. Clegg, film producer (Out of Africa) and president of the Guild of Film Production Executives (now known as the Production Guild of Great Britain) wrote an obituary on Orme: "I am sad to record the death of one of our long standing honorary members Charles Orme. Charles had been retired for many years and lived in recent times in Chalfont St. Giles. He spent much of his early career with Emeric Pressburger and Michael Powell and was involved in many of their famous productions like The Red Shoes and The Battle of the River Plate. He also had a long standing working relationship with John Boorman. The last time I worked with him was on Khartoum way back in 1965 and I remember his stiff upper lip British reserve of being something of a comfort to a young and inexperienced second A.D. in the oppressive heat of Cairo. I thought of him as 'posh' in those days but in fact he was a thorough professional and someone you could rely on in any kind of adversity. He was a credit to our business."

Michael Powell, film director (on Orme from the second volume of his autobiography: Million-dollar Movie): "Charles Orme from the production office had been working for weeks on an elaborate cue board which was to be used to signal gun flashes, water splashes, drifting smoke, loud explosions, turning control towers and rocking bridges, as well as big bangs and flashes between the cameras and the actors. All this had to be controlled with the electrical panel behind, and above, the camera. I now broke it to him that he would have to work his panel himself because I was sending Syd to Montevideo, to mobilise the government, the police, the army, and ten thousand civilians to come down to the docks on a specified Saturday and Sunday. Charles had led a rather sheltered life up until then, but he rose to the occasion all right. Archers do, and after all he was Emeric's brother-in-law."

== Filmography ==
Year	Film	Rotten Tomatoes	IMDb
1948	The Red Shoes	98%	8.3/10
1949	The Small Back Room	80%	7.5/10
1950	The Elusive Pimpernel	N/A	6.4/10
1950	Gone to Earth	80%	7.4/10
1951	The Tales of Hoffmann	81%	7.5/10
1952	Where's Charley?	N/A	6.1/10
1954	Souls in Conflict	N/A	7.9/10
1954	Meines Vaters Pferde, 1. Teil: Lena und Nicoline	N/A	6.9/10
1955	Oh... Rosalinda!!	75%	6.8/10
1956	The Battle of the River Plate	80%	6.6/10
1957	Ill Met by Moonlight	N/A	6.6/10
1957	Miracle in Soho	N/A	6.7/10
1957	Just My Luck	N/A	6.3/10
1958	Innocent Sinners	N/A	7.2/10
1958	The Wind Cannot Read	N/A	6.0/10
1958	The Square Peg	N/A	7.3/10
1959	The 39 Steps	70%	6.5/10
1959	Upstairs and Downstairs	N/A	7.3/10
1959	Follow a Star	N/A	6.4/10
1960	The League of Gentlemen	100%	7.5/10
1960	Doctor in Love	N/A	5.7/10
1961	No Love for Johnnie	75%	7.4/10
1961	Flame in the Streets	67%	6.4/10
1961	No My Darling Daughter	N/A	6.3/10
1962	A Pair of Briefs	N/A	6.0/10
1962	In the Doghouse	N/A	6.5/10
1962	Life for Ruth	N/A	7.2/10
1962	The Wild and the Willing	N/A	6.1/10
1963	The Mind Benders	N/A	6.7/10
1963	Doctor in Distress	N/A	5.6/10
1963	The Informers	N/A	6.9/10
1964	Woman of Straw	63%	6.7/10
1964	The High Bright Sun	N/A	5.7/10
1965	The Intelligence Men	65%	6.0/10
1966	Khartoum	100%	6.9/10
1968	Inspector Clouseau	N/A	4.9/10
1969	The Assassination Bureau	76%	6.8/10
1970	Performance	84%	7.1/10
1970	A Day at the Beach	N/A	6.8/10
1972	Deliverance	93%	7.8/10
1974	Zardoz	N/A	5.8/10
1974	The Man with the Golden Gun	N/A	6.8/10
1975	The Adventure of Sherlock Holmes' Smarter Brother	60%	6.1/10
1976	The Omen	86%	7.6/10
1977	Exorcist II: The Heretic	N/A	3.7/10
1978	Damien: Omen II	N/A	6.2/10
1981	Excalibur	82%	7.4/10
1981	Outland	58%	6.6/10
1982	Brimstone and Treacle	70%	6.5/10
1985	King David	N/A	5.0/10
