= Lionel Damer =

British politician

Hon. Lionel Damer MP
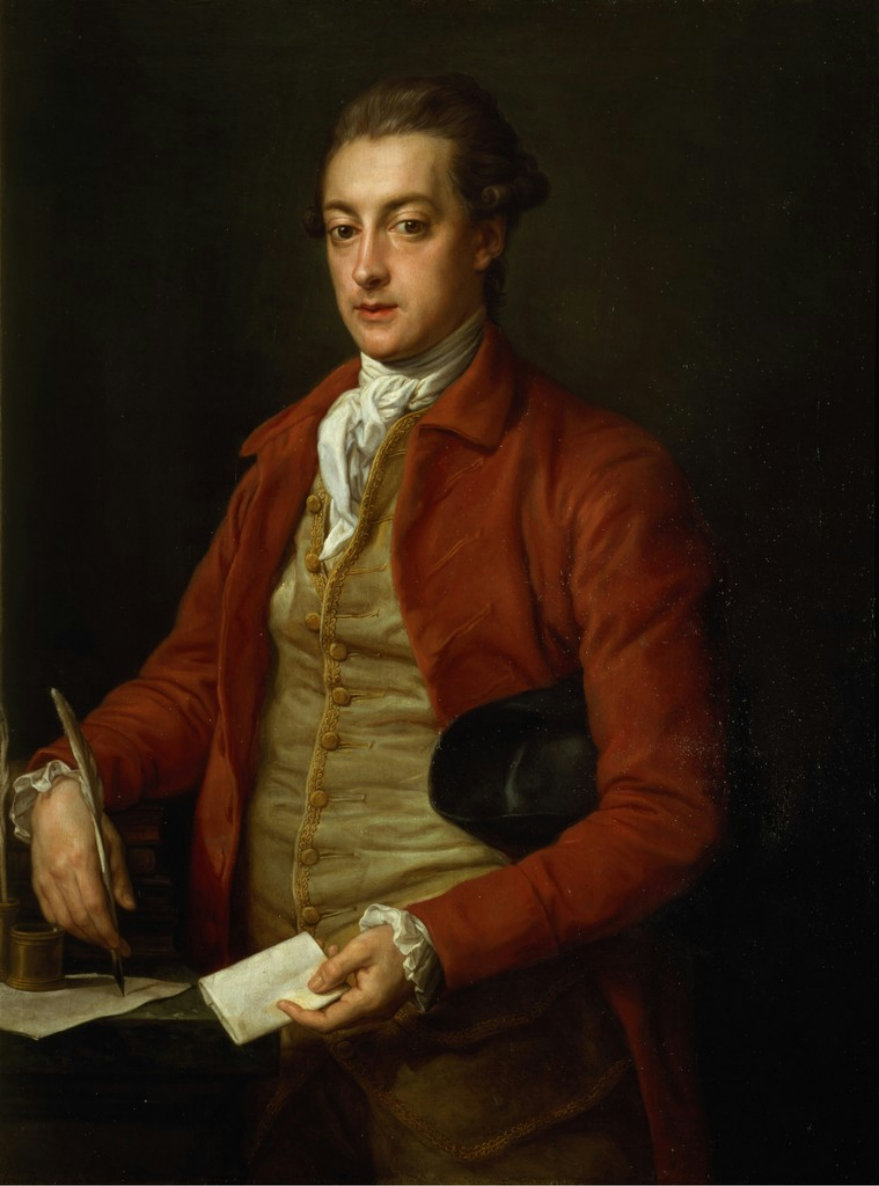
- Portrait of Lionel Damer by Pompeo Batoni

Member of Parliament for Peterborough
- In office 28 February 1786 – 21 February 1802
- Preceded by: James Farrel Phipps
- Succeeded by: William Elliot

Personal details
- Born: 16 September 1748
- Died: 28 May 1807 (aged 58)
- Party: Whig
- Spouse: Williamsa Janssen (m. 16 April 1778, d. 1834)
- Education: Trinity College, Cambridge

Hon. Lionel Damer (16 September 1748 – 28 May 1807) was a British Whig politician.

== Family ==
Lionel Damer was the third son of Joseph Damer, 1st Earl of Dorchester by Lady Caroline Sackville (daughter of Lionel Cranfield Sackville, 1st Duke of Dorset and Elizabeth Colyear, his wife, daughter of Lieutenant-General Walter Philip Colyear (brother to David Colyear, 1st Earl of Portmore). Lionel's brothers were the Hon. John Damer and the Rt. Hon. George Damer, 2nd Earl of Dorchester.

Lionel Damer was educated at Eton (1755–65) and Trinity College, Cambridge (1766). He married Williamsa or Williamsea Janssen (daughter of William Janssen Esq, fourth son of Sir Theodore Janssen, 1st Baronet of Owre Moyne). They lived at Came House in Winterborne Came and there is a memorial to them in St Peter's Church nearby.

== Political career ==
Lionel was appointed Sheriff of Dorset for the year 1785. He was the Member of Parliament for Peterborough 28 February 1786 – 21 February 1802. He took over the seat following the death of James Farrel Phipps. He held the seat until ill health forced him to retire shortly before the General Election in 1802.

Parliament of Great Britain
Preceded by James Farrel Phipps; Richard Benyon	Member of Parliament for Peterborough; 1786 – 1800; With: Richard Benyon until 1796; French Laurence from 1796	Succeeded by Parliament of the United Kingdom
Parliament of the United Kingdom
Preceded by Parliament of Great Britain	Member of Parliament for Peterborough; 1801 – 1802; With: French Laurence	Succeeded by William Elliot; French Laurence
Civic offices
Preceded by Isaac Sage	Sheriff of Dorset; 1785	Succeeded by Henry William Portman
