= William Elliot (Irish politician) =

Irish politician

William Elliot (12 March 1766 – 26 October 1818) was an Irish politician who sat in the Irish House of Commons before its abolition. After the Act of Union he sat as a Whig in the House of Commons of the United Kingdom of Great Britain and Ireland.

== Biography ==
Elliot was elected to the Irish House of Commons in 1796 as a Member of Parliament for St Canice. At the 1798 election he was returned for both Carlow and for St Canice, but chose to continue to sit for St Canice. He held that seat until the Parliament of Ireland was abolished at the end of 1800 by the Act of Union, when he did not initially have a seat in the new Parliament of the United Kingdom.

However, he was elected at an unopposed by-election in March 1801 as MP for Portarlington, and held that seat until the 1802 general election, when he was returned to the House of Commons of the United Kingdom for the English borough of Peterborough. He held that seat until his death in October 1818, aged 52.

He was sworn as a Privy Councillor in March 1806, in Dublin Castle, and appointed on 28 March as Chief Secretary for Ireland in the Ministry of All the Talents. He held that post until 1807.

Parliament of Ireland
Preceded by Sylvester Douglas; John Monck Mason	Member of Parliament for St Canice; 1796 – 1800; With: John Monck Mason	Succeeded by Parliament of the United Kingdom
Preceded by Sir Frederick Flood, Bt; John Ormsby Vandeleur	Member of Parliament for Carlow; 1798; With: Henry Prittie	Succeeded by John Wolfe; Henry Prittie
Parliament of the United Kingdom
Preceded by Frederick Trench, 1st Baron Ashtown	Member of Parliament for Portarlington; March 1801 – 1802	Succeeded by Henry Parnell
Preceded by Hon. Lionel Damer; Dr. French Laurence	Member of Parliament for Peterborough; 1802 – 1818; With: Dr. French Laurence to 1809; Marquess of Tavistock 1809–1812; George Ponsonby 1812–1816; Hon. William Lamb 1816	Succeeded by Sir Robert Heron, Bt; Hon. William Lamb
Political offices
Preceded by Charles Long	Chief Secretary for Ireland; 1806–1807	Succeeded by Sir Arthur Wellesley
