= French Laurence =

British politician (1757–1809)

French Laurence DCL
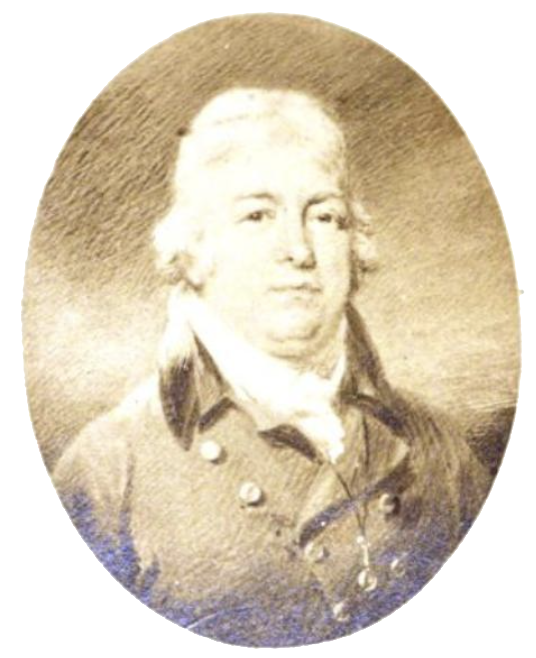
- Portrait of Laurence by John Inigo Wright

Member of Parliament for Peterborough
- In office 26 October 1796 – 27 February 1809
- Preceded by: Richard Benyon
- Succeeded by: Marquess of Tavistock

Personal details
- Born: 3 April 1757 Bath, Somerset
- Died: 27 February 1809 (aged 51) Eltham, Kent
- Party: Whig
- Relations: Richard Laurence (brother)
- Parent(s): Richard Laurence & Elizabeth French
- Education: Winchester School
- Alma mater: Corpus Christi College, Oxford
- Occupation: Jurist, politician, writer, poet

French Laurence (3 April 1757 – 27 February 1809) was an English jurist and man of letters, a close associate of Edmund Burke whose literary executor he became.

== Life ==
He was the eldest son of Richard Laurence, watchmaker, of Bath, Somerset by Elizabeth, daughter of John French, clothier, of Warminster, Wiltshire, and was born on 3 April 1757. Richard Laurence was his younger brother. He was educated at Winchester School under Joseph Warton, and at Corpus Christi College, Oxford, of which he was scholar. He graduated B.A. on 17 December 1777, and proceeded M.A. on 21 June 1781. On leaving the university he took chambers at the Middle Temple with the view of being called to the common-law bar, but eventually devoted himself to civil law, and having taken the degree of D.C.L. at Oxford, 19 October 1787, was admitted to the College of Advocates on 3 November 1788.

Having made himself useful to Burke in preparing the preliminary case against Warren Hastings, he was retained as counsel in 1788 by the managers of the impeachment, together with William Scott, for colleague. He took no part in the proceedings in Westminster Hall beyond attending and watching their progress, but gave advice in chambers. His practice in ecclesiastical and admiralty courts thenceforward grew rapidly. He remained on intimate terms with Burke until his death, and was his literary executor.

In 1796 he was appointed, through the interest of the Duke of Portland, regius professor of civil law at Oxford, in succession to Thomas Francis Wenman, and the same year, through the influence of Burke with Earl Fitzwilliam, entered parliament as member for Peterborough. His speeches in parliament heavy and simply followed Burke's line, except in matters of international law. In opposing the union with Ireland he insisted that Burke, had he lived, would have done so likewise. Laurence was a member of the committee appointed in 1806 to frame the articles of impeachment against Henry Dundas, 1st Viscount Melville, the last such case. He was chancellor of the diocese of Oxford and a judge of the court of admiralty of the Cinque ports. He died suddenly on 26 February 1809, while on a visit to one of his brothers at Eltham, Kent, and was buried in Eltham Church, where a marble tablet was placed to his memory. Laurence did not marry. His leisure time he spent in society—he was a member of the Eumelean Club—or in writing.

== Works ==
While pursuing his legal studies he wrote political ballads in aid of Charles James Fox's candidature for Westminster in 1784, and contributed to the Rolliad the advertisements and dedication, Criticisms iii. vi. vii. viii. xiii. and xiv. in the first part, vii. in the second part; Probationary Odes xvi. and xxi.; and the first of the Political Eclogues, viz. Rose, or the Complaint.

His letters to Burke were published and edited by his brother in The Epistolary Correspondence of the Right Hon. Edmund Burke and Dr. French Laurence, London, 1827. His Poetical Remains, published with those of his brother Richard (Dublin, 1872), include some odes, and a few sonnets and some translations from the Greek, Latin, and Italian. Laurence was also a frequent contributor to the Gentleman's Magazine. His dabblings in theology appeared as Critical Remarks on Detached Passages of the New Testament, particularly the Revelation of St. John, Oxford, 1810, edited by his brother.

== Sources ==
- This article incorporates text from a publication now in the public domain: "Laurence, French". Dictionary of National Biography. London: Smith, Elder & Co. 1885–1900.

Parliament of Great Britain
Preceded by Richard Benyon; Lionel Damer	Member of Parliament for Peterborough; 1796 – 1800; With: Lionel Damer	Succeeded by Parliament of the United Kingdom
Parliament of the United Kingdom
Preceded by Parliament of Great Britain	Member of Parliament for Peterborough; 1801 – 1809; With: Lionel Damer to 1802; William Elliot from 1802	Succeeded by Marquess of Tavistock; William Elliot
