= Gounter =

Gounter is a surname. Notable people with the surname include:

- Charles Gounter or Sir Charles Gounter Nicoll, (1703/04–1733), appointed Knight of the Order of the Bath
- George Gounter (c. 1646–1718), English politician, father of Charles
