= Letters from Turkey =

Letters from Turkey were a genre of letter collection written by Europeans who had been to Ottoman Empire. Usually, the letters were published with various titles, but they are popularly known as "Letters from Turkey" or "Turkish letters". Below is the summary of these.

== Letters by Busbecq ==
Ogier Ghiselin de Busbecq (1522–1592) was a diplomat in the Holy Roman Empire. He was sent to the Ottoman Empire to discuss the disputed territory of Transylvania (modern west Romania) in 1554. During his stay his addresses were Rüstem Pasha and Semiz Ali Pasha both of which were grand viziers. Upon returning to his country he published the letters he had written to his colleague Nicholas Michault under the title Turcicae epistolae. Busbuecq is also known for his introduction of tulip, from Turkish flora to Europe.

== Letters by Montagu ==
Lady Mary Wortley Montagu (1689–1762) was the wife of Edward Wortley Montagu, the British ambassador to Ottoman Empire between 1716-1718. The letters about her travels and observations about Ottoman life was published under the title Turkish Embassy Letters. One of her important observations was the primitive form of smallpox vaccination.

== Letters by Mikes ==
Kelemen Mikes (1690–1761) was a Hungarian essayist, noted for his rebellious activities against the Habsburg monarchy. Although backed by Ottoman Empire, Hungarian rebels were defeated and Mikes had to choose a life in exile. After 1715, Mikes spent the rest of his life in Tekirdağ, a city near to Constantinople. His work is known as Letters from Turkey.

== Letters by Moltke ==
Helmuth von Moltke the Elder (1800–1891) was an officier in Prussian army. He spent four years in the Ottoman Empire as a military advisor between 1835-1839. Upon returning to Germany, he published Letters on Conditions and Events in Turkey in the Years 1835 to 1839.

== Gallery ==
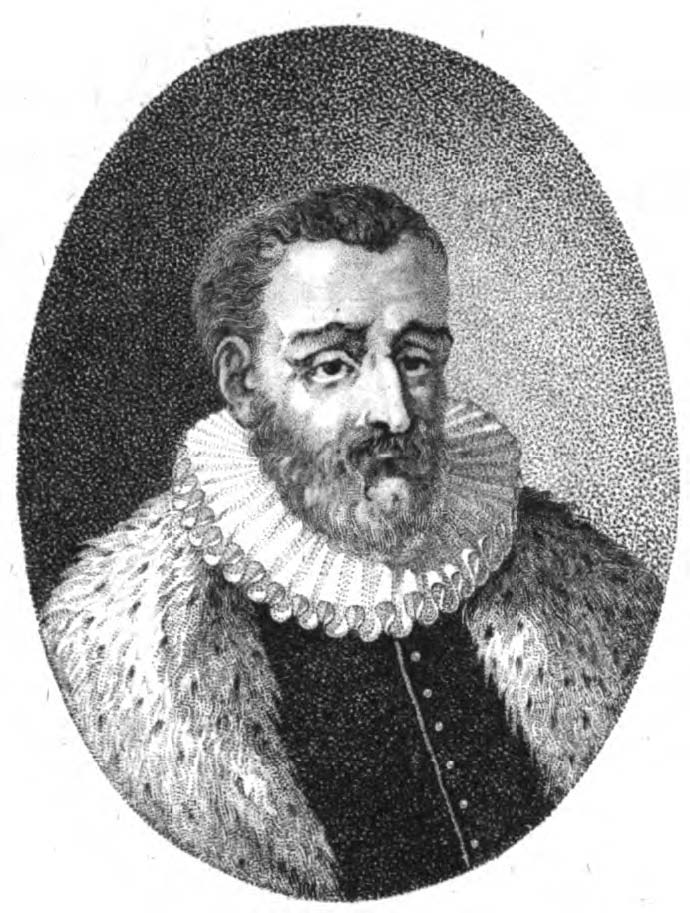
Busbecq

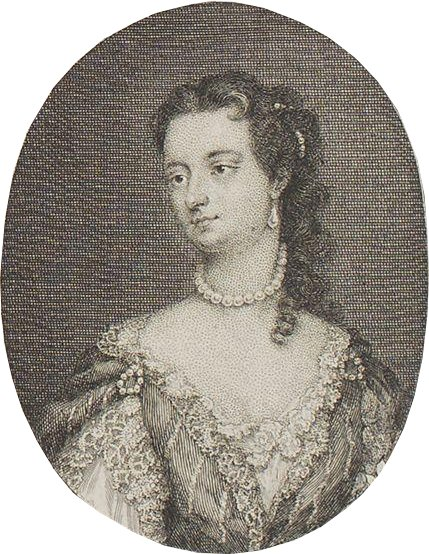
Montagu

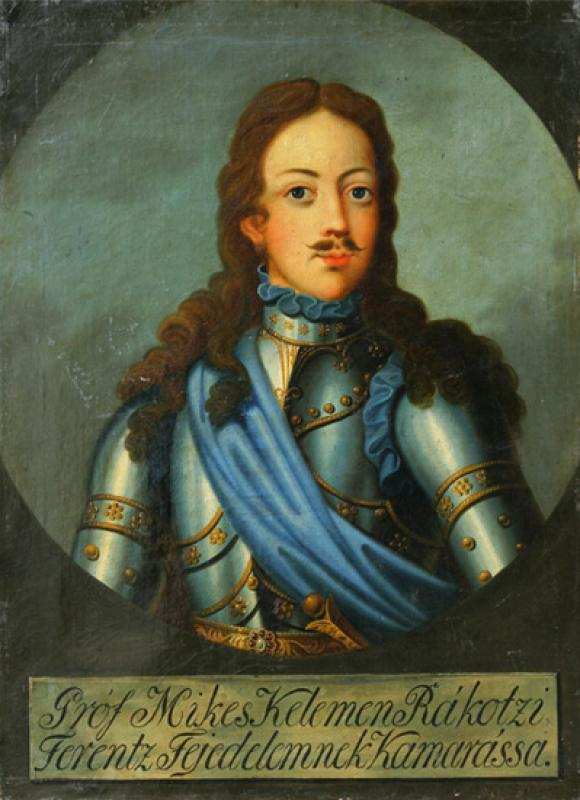
Mikes

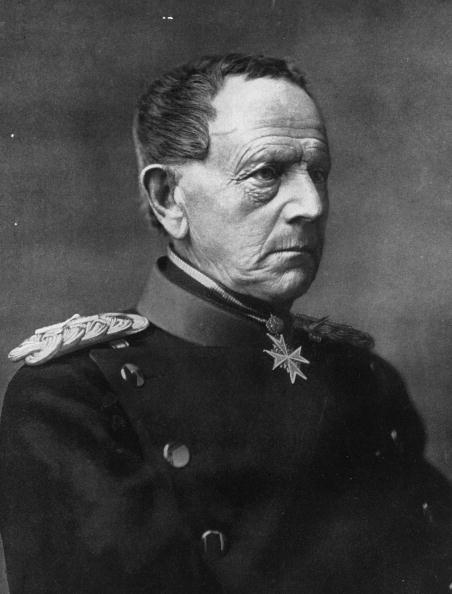
Moltke

== See also ==
- Sefaretname
