= Matthew Wyldbore =

British politician

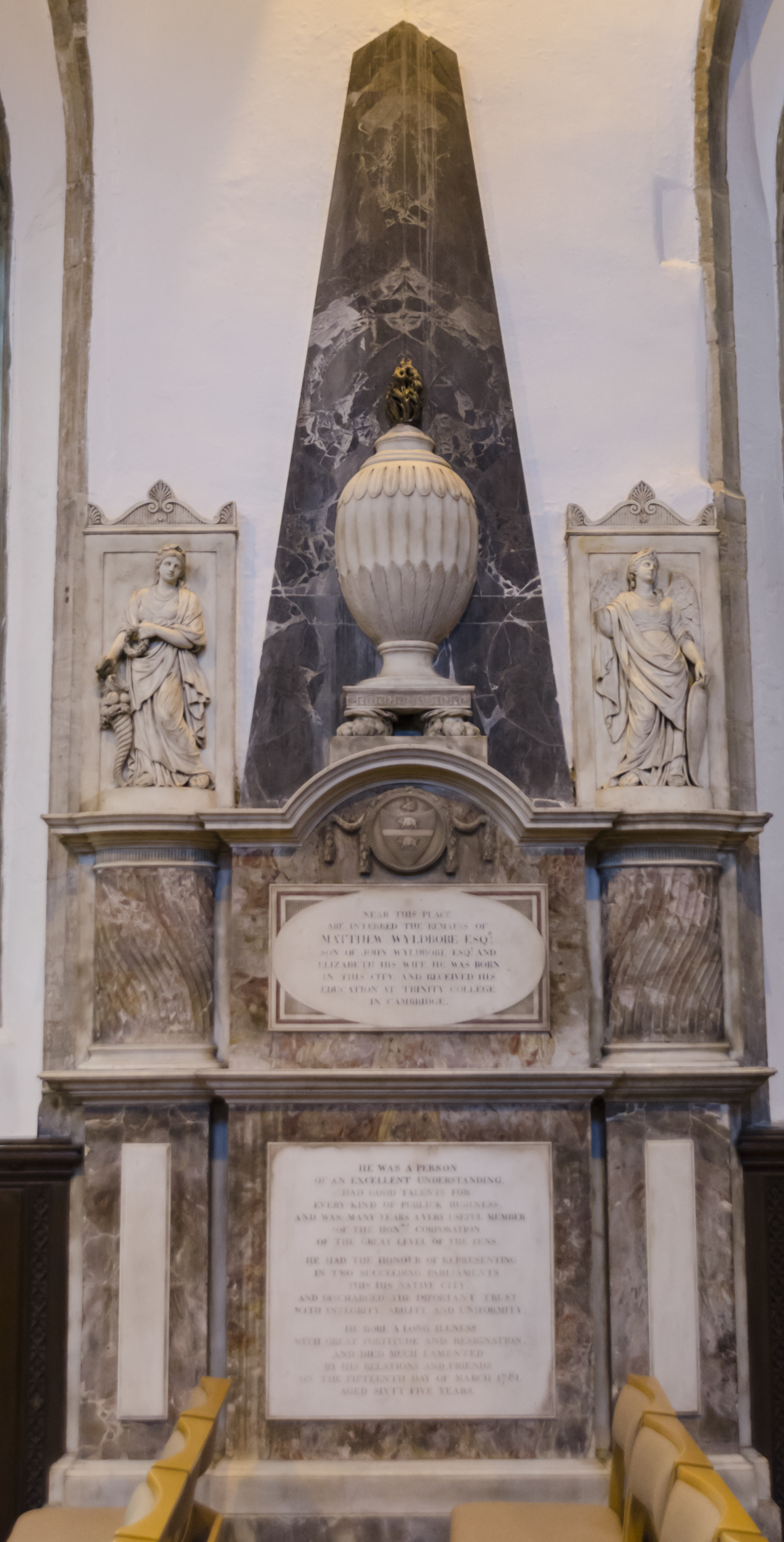
- Monument in St John the Baptist Church, Peterborough
- Born: 1716
- Died: 15 March 1781
- Occupation: British politician
- Parent(s): John Wyldbore, Elizabeth Neale

Matthew Wyldbore (c.1716- 15 March 1781) was a British politician who sat in the House of Commons from 1768 to 1780.

Wyldbore was the only surviving son of John Wyldbore of Peterborough and his wife Elizabeth Neale, daughter of Noah Neale of Stamford Baron. He was baptised on 15 April 1716 at St John the Baptist Church, Peterborough. He was educated at Newcome's School in Hackney and entered Trinity College, Cambridge on 26 June 1733, aged 17. He was also admitted at Inner Temple on 27 March 1735. He succeeded his father in 1755. For many years, he was a member of the Bedford Level Corporation.

Wyldbore served as Whig Member of Parliament for Peterborough, 1768–1780. He was notorious for bribing large portions of the electorate to vote for him, and there are political cartoons mocking his expenditure.

Wyldbore died unmarried in 1781. A monument to his memory can be found in the Lady Chapel of St John the Baptist Church, Peterborough. Wyldbore has a particular connection with St John's Church because of a legacy he left to the bellringers, reputedly in gratitude for when he was lost in the fog in The Fens, he found his way safely to Peterborough by following the sound of St John's bells. It has, however, been explained that the reason for the benefaction was that Wyldbore was an ardent campanologist, and desired to promote the study of bell-ringing. He left a bequest for a peal of bells on the anniversary of his death, a tradition which continues each 15 March. Matthew Wyldbore's Charity is still in existence as of March 2022.

Parliament of Great Britain
| Preceded by Sir Matthew Lamb, 1st Baronet; Armstead Parker | Member of Parliament for 1768–1780; With: Sir Matthew Lamb, 1st Baronet; Henry Belasyse, Viscount Belasyse; Richard Benyon | Succeeded by Richard Benyon; James Farrel Phipps |
