= Henry Belasyse, 2nd Earl Fauconberg =

British politician and militia officer (1742–1802)

The Right Honourable The Earl Fauconberg
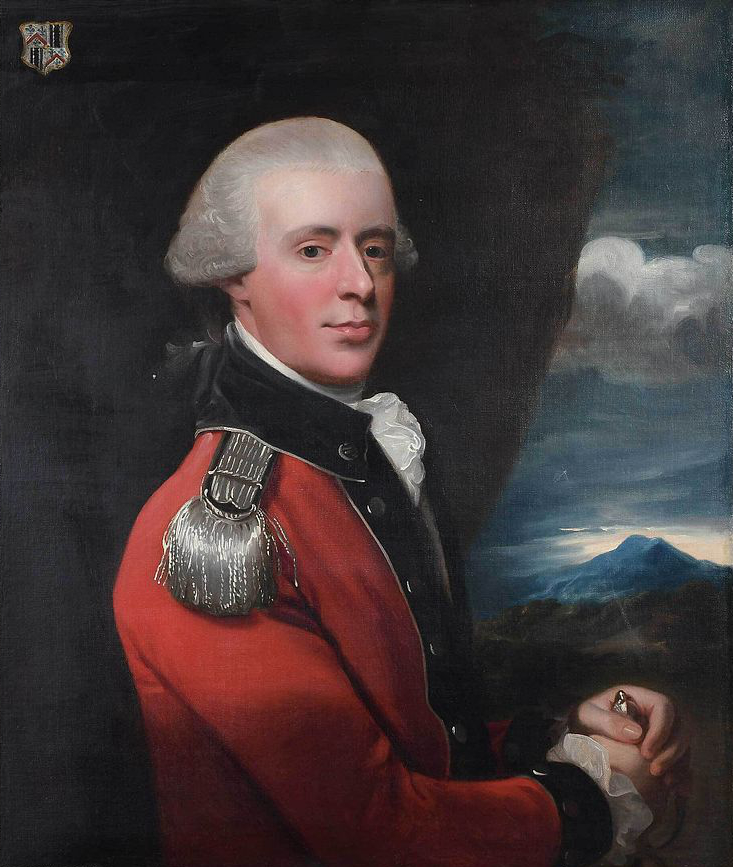
- c. 1794 portrait of Fauconberg in the uniform of the North York Militia by John Singleton Copley

Personal details
- Born: 13 April 1742
- Died: 23 March 1802 (aged 59)
- Party: Whig
- Spouse(s): Charlotte Lamb; Jane Cheshyre

Henry Belasyse, 2nd Earl Fauconberg (13 April 1742 – 23 March 1802) was a British Whig politician and militia officer who represented Peterborough in the House of Commons of Great Britain from 1768 to 1774.

== Early life ==
Fauconberg was the son of Thomas Belasyse, 1st Earl Fauconberg and Catherine Betham.

== Career ==
He sat as a Member of Parliament for Peterborough from 1768 to 1774 as a member of the Whigs. Following his succession to his father's title in 1774, Fauconberg assumed his seat in the House of Lords. He was a Lord of the Bedchamber from 1777 until his death in 1802, and was Custos Rotulorum and Lord Lieutenant of the North Riding of Yorkshire over the same period. In 1779 he raised a Yorkshire regiment of fencible infantry, 'Lord Fauconberg's Regiment' or 'Fauconberg's Fencibles' of which he was Colonel. They were disbanded in 1783. He was also commissioned as colonel of the North York Militia on 18 November 1779 and remained in command until he resigned on grounds of ill health 25 May 1797.

== Marriages and issue ==
On 29 May 1766, he married the Hon. Charlotte Lamb, the daughter of Sir Matthew Lamb, 1st Baronet and sister of Peniston Lamb, 1st Viscount Melbourne. Together they had four daughters:

- Lady Anne Belasyse (1760–1808), married Sir George Wombwell, 2nd Baronet in 1791 and had issue.
- Lady Charlotte Belasyse (1767–1825), married Thomas Edward Belasyse-Wynn. No issue.
- Lady Elizabeth Belasyse (1770–1819), married firstly Bernard Howard, 12th Duke of Norfolk in 1789 and had issue. Married secondly Richard Bingham, 2nd Earl of Lucan in 1794 and had issue.
- Lady Harriet Belasyse (1776– died young).

On 5 January 1791 he married Jane Cheshyre, daughter of John Cheshyre, Esq., of Bennington co. Hertford. She died 4 April 1820 and they had no children.

As Fauconberg had no sons, his earldom became extinct upon his death. He was succeeded by his cousin, Rowland Belasyse, in his viscountcy and barony. Through his wife he was the uncle of the Whig Prime Minister William Lamb, 2nd Viscount Melbourne.

Parliament of Great Britain
Preceded by Sir Matthew Lamb, Bt; Matthew Wyldbore	Member of Parliament for Peterborough; 1768 – 1774; With: Matthew Wyldbore	Succeeded by Richard Benyon; Matthew Wyldbore
Peerage of Great Britain
Preceded by Thomas Belasyse	Earl Fauconberg; 2nd creation 1774–1802	Extinct
Peerage of England
Preceded by Thomas Belasyse	Viscount Fauconberg; 1st creation 1774–1802	Succeeded by Rowland Belasyse
