= Richard Benyon (MP for Peterborough) =

British politician (1746–1796)

Richard Benyon (1746–1796) was an English landowner and politician who sat in the House of Commons from 1774 to 1796.

== Biography ==
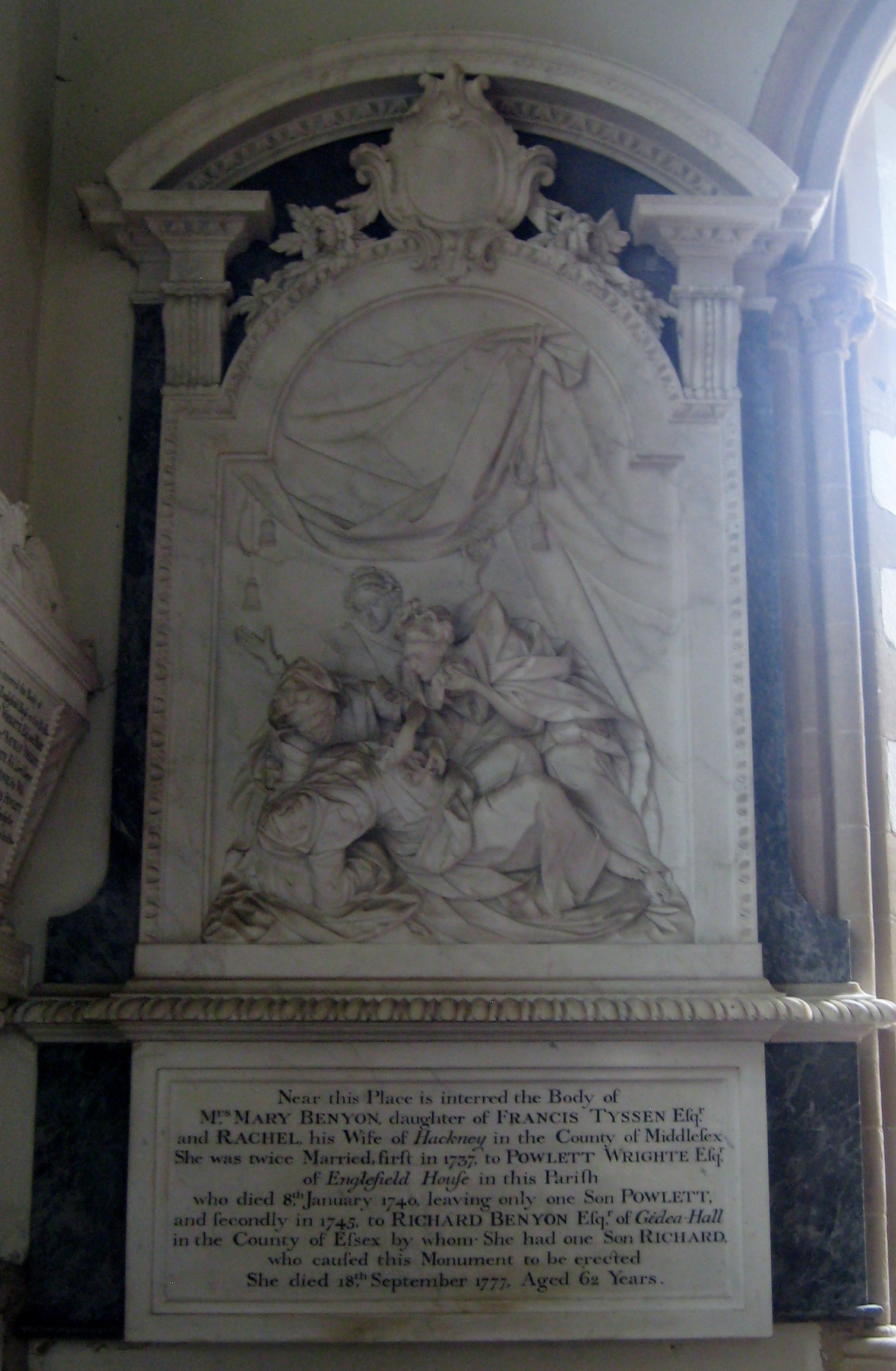
Monument erected by Richard Benyon to his mother at Englefield

Benyon was the son of Richard Benyon, President of Madras and his third wife Mary Tyssen, daughter of Francis Tyssen of Hackney, and was born on 28 June 1746. He was educated at Eton College from 1759 to 1762. He married Hannah Hulse, daughter of Sir Edward Hulse, 1st Baronet. His father died on 27 September 1774 and he succeeded to his estates at Gidea Hall and Englefield House.

Benyon was a friend and contemporary at Eton of Lord Fitzwilliam, and was returned on his interest as Member of Parliament for Peterborough at a by-election on 16 February 1774. He was returned at Peterborough in a contest in the 1774 general election. The Public Ledger described him as “A well-meaning honest man” in 1779. He was returned at Peterborough unopposed in 1780, 1784 and 1790. He followed Lord Fitzwilliam in politics and there is no record of his having spoken in the House. He did not long survive his re-election in 1796.

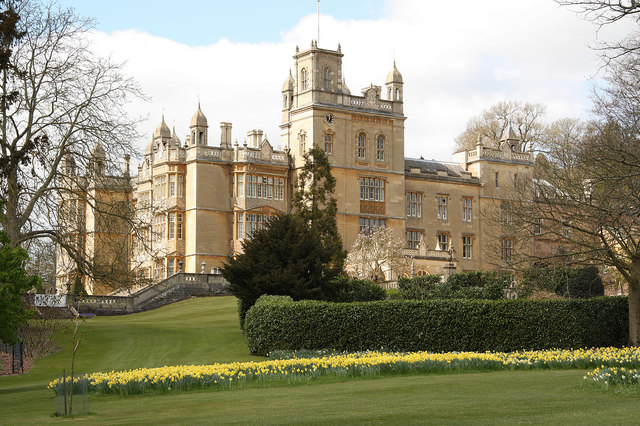
Englefield House

Benyon died ‘of the gout in his stomach’ on 22 August 1796, leaving estates in Essex and Berkshire worth £8,000 p.a. He was succeeded by his son Richard Benyon De Beauvoir. His daughter Emma married William Henry Fellowes and his daughter Maria married George Brodrick, 4th Viscount Midleton.

Parliament of Great Britain
Preceded by Henry Belasyse, Viscount Belasyse; Matthew Wyldbore	Member of Parliament for Peterborough; 1774–1796; With: Matthew Wyldbore 1774-1780; James Farrel Phipps 1780-1786; Hon. Lionel Damer 1786-1796	Succeeded by Dr. French Laurence; Hon. Lionel Damer
