= Joseph Banks (MP for Peterborough) =

British landowner and politician

Joseph Banks (21 June 1695 – 31 March 1741), of Revesby Abbey, Lincolnshire was a British landowner and politician who sat in the House of Commons from 1728 to 1734.

Banks was the eldest son of Joseph Banks of Scofton (just east of Worksop) in Nottinghamshire. He was admitted at the Middle Temple in 1711. He married Anne Hodgkinson, the daughter and heiress of merchant William Hodgkinson, merchant of Overton, Derbyshire, on 11 April 1714. In 1715 he was a lieutenant in the Nottinghamshire militia. He succeeded his father in 1727, inheriting the estate of Revesby Abbey, Lincolnshire, which provided an income of £3,000 a year.

Banks was returned as member of parliament for Peterborough on the government interest at a by-election on 22 May 1728. In his disappointment at not being awarded the office of custos rotulorum of the city a few months later, he went over to the Opposition and voted against the Government in every recorded division. He did not stand at the 1734 British general election.

Banks was elected a Fellow of the Royal Society in 1730. His wife Anne died on 9 September 1730 and he married as his second wife Catherine Wallis, born Collingwood, widow of his former tenant Newcomen Wallis on 19 October 1731. He was appointed High Sheriff of Lincolnshire for the year 1735 to 1736.

Banks died on 31 March 1741. By his first wife Anne, he had three daughters and three sons, including William, also an MP. He had a further two sons by his second wife Catherine. His son William was the father of Sir Joseph Banks, the eminent botanist.

Parliament of Great Britain
Preceded by John FitzWilliam, Viscount Milton; Hon. Sidney Wortley-Montagu	Member of Parliament for Peterborough; 1728–1734; With: John FitzWilliam, Viscount Milton 1728-1729; Charles Gounter-Nicoll 1729-1733; Armstead Parker1734	Succeeded by Armstead Parker; Edward Wortley Montagu
