= Sir Matthew Lamb, 1st Baronet =

British barrister and politician

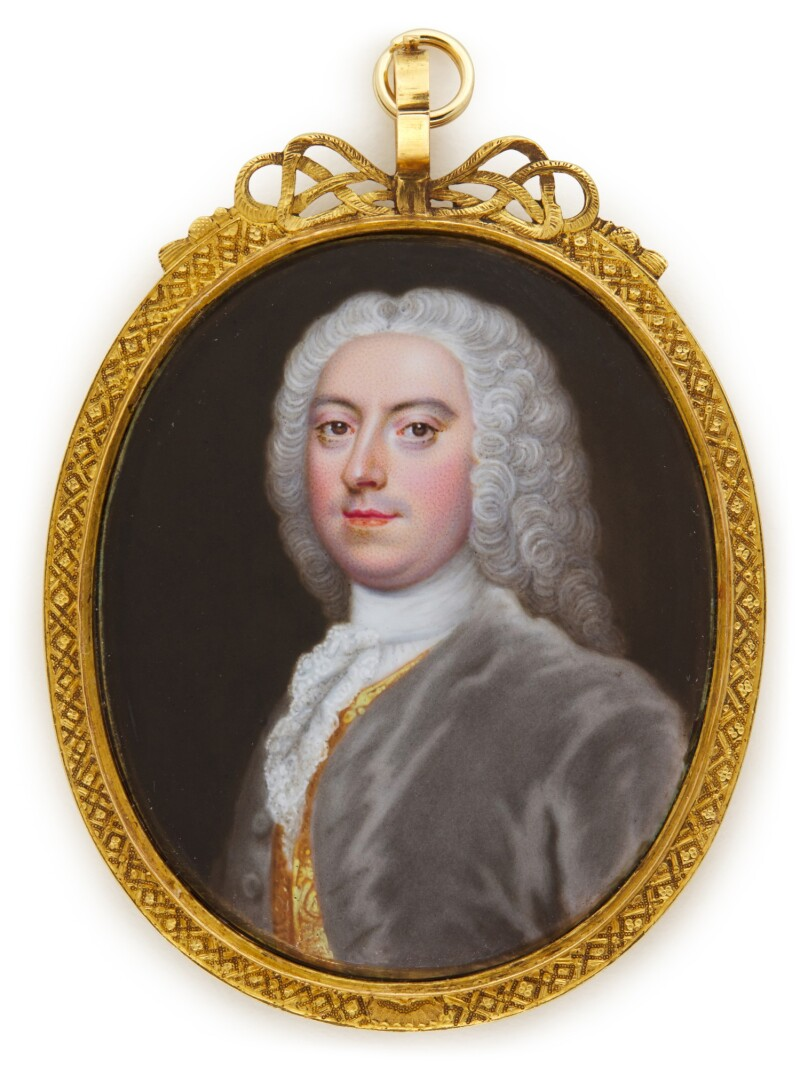
Portrait of Sir Matthew Lamb

Sir Matthew Lamb, 1st Baronet (1705 – 6 November 1768) was a British barrister and politician. He was the grandfather of Prime Minister William Lamb, 2nd Viscount Melbourne.

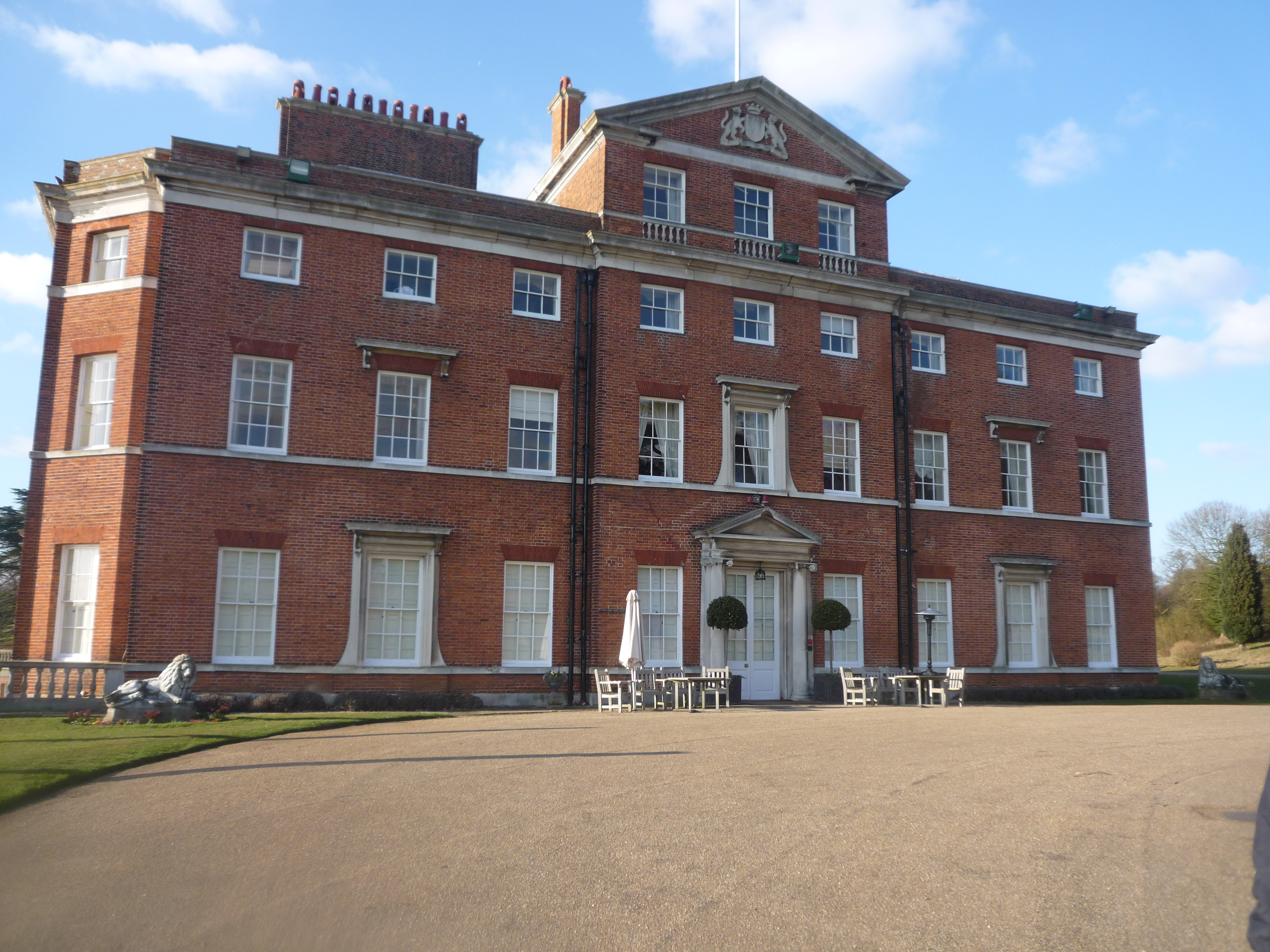
Brocket Hall

Lamb was the son of Matthew Lamb, of Southwell, Nottinghamshire, and nephew of Peniston Lamb. His brother was Robert Lamb, bishop of Peterborough. He sat as member of parliament for Stockbridge between 1741 and 1747 and for Peterborough between 1747 and 1768. In 1755 he was created a Baronet, of Brocket Hall in Hertfordshire.

He married with Charlotte, daughter and heiress of Thomas Coke who succeeded to Melbourne Hall in Derbyshire. He died in November 1768 and was succeeded in the baronetcy by his son Peniston, who was raised to the peerage as Viscount Melbourne in 1770. His daughter Charlotte married Henry Belasyse, 2nd Earl Fauconberg.

Parliament of Great Britain
Preceded by Sir Humphrey Monoux; John Berkeley	Member of Parliament for Stockbridge; 1741–1747; With: Charles Churchill	Succeeded by Daniel Boone; William Chetwynd
Preceded by Edward Wortley Montagu; Armstead Parker	Member of Parliament for Peterborough; 1747–1768; With: Edward Wortley Montagu 1747–1761; Armstead Parker 1761–1768; Matthew Wyldbore 1768	Succeeded by Matthew Wyldbore; Viscount Belasyse
Baronetage of Great Britain
New creation	Baronet (of Brocket Hall); 1755–1768	Succeeded by Peniston Lamb
