= Lady Mary Wortley Montagu =

English writer and poet (1689–1762)

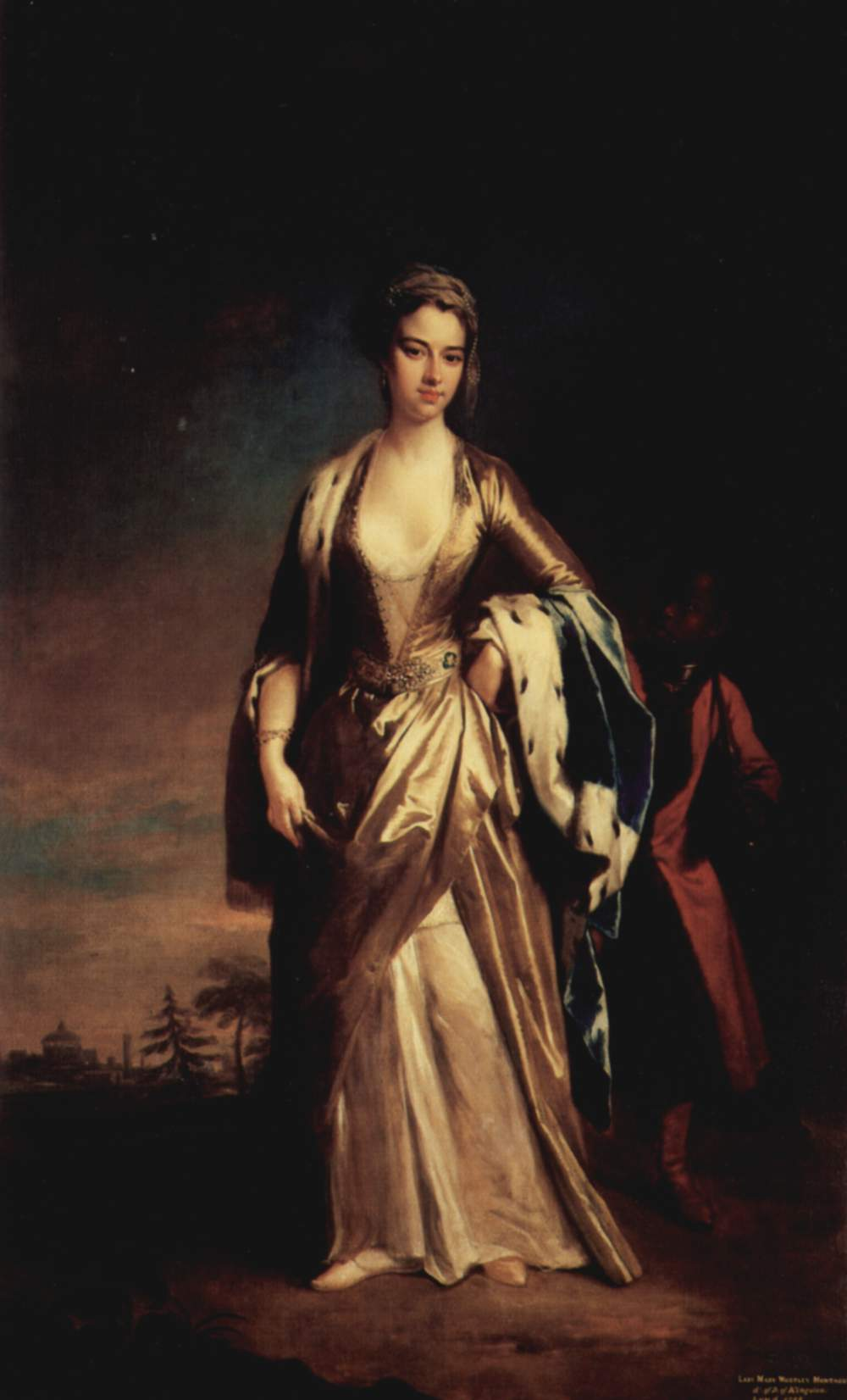
- Born: Mary Pierrepont; 15 May 1689; Holme Pierrepont Hall, Nottinghamshire, England
- Died: 21 August 1762 (aged 73); London, England
- Resting place: Grosvenor Chapel
- Occupations: Aristocrat, writer, and poet
- Known for: Introducing and advocating for smallpox inoculation to Britain
- Spouse: Edward Wortley Montagu (m. 1712; died 1761)
- Children: Edward Wortley Montagu; Mary Stuart, Countess of Bute
- Parents: Evelyn Pierrepont, 1st Duke of Kingston-upon-Hull (father); Mary Feilding (mother)

Lady Mary Wortley Montagu (née Pierrepont; 15 May 1689 – 21 August 1762) was an English aristocrat, medical pioneer, writer, and poet. Born in 1689, Lady Mary spent her early life in England. In 1712, Lady Mary married Edward Wortley Montagu, who later served as the British ambassador to the Sublime Porte. Lady Mary joined her husband on the Ottoman excursion, where she was to spend the next two years of her life. During her time there, Lady Mary wrote extensively on her experience as a woman in Ottoman Constantinople. After her return to England, Lady Mary devoted her attention to the upbringing of her family before dying of cancer in 1762.

Although having regularly socialised with the court of George I and George Augustus, Prince of Wales (later King George II) , Lady Mary is today chiefly remembered for her letters, particularly her Turkish Embassy Letters describing her travels to the Ottoman Empire, as wife to the British ambassador to Turkey, which Billie Melman describes as "the very first example of a secular work by a woman about the Muslim Orient". Aside from her writing, Mary is also known for introducing and advocating smallpox inoculation in Britain after her return from Turkey. Her writings address and challenge some contemporary social attitudes towards women and their intellectual and social growth at that time.

== Early life ==
Lady Mary Pierrepont was born on 15 May 1689 at Holme Pierrepont Hall in Nottinghamshire, and baptised on 26 May 1689 at St. Paul's Church in Covent Garden, London. She was the eldest child of Evelyn Pierrepont, 1st Duke of Kingston-upon-Hull, and his first wife Lady Mary Feilding, the only daughter of the third Earl of Denbigh. Lady Mary had three younger siblings: two girls, Frances and Evelyn, and a boy, William.

Lady Mary was a bright, free-spirited child who dreamed of greatness. She wrote in her diary, "I am going to write a history so uncommon." Members of the newly formed Kit-Cat Club, a group of fashionable men, nominated her when she was seven years old, as the subject of their toast to the beauty of the season, and they had her name engraved on the glass goblet used for this purpose. As a child, she had a "desire of catching the setting sun" and she would run across the meadow to "catch hold of the great golden ball of fire sinking on the horizon". However, she then realized that this activity "was impossible". Overall, the pursuit of achieving the impossible became a recurring pattern throughout her life.

Lady Mary's mother died in 1697. Lady Mary, however, mainly lived with her paternal grandmother, Elizabeth Pierrepont, during her early childhood. Her grandmother died when Lady Mary was eight years old, after which she lived at her father's house. Her father did not believe he was obliged to assist with her education.

== Education ==
Mary Wortley Montagu's education was divided between a governess and the use of the library at the family property Thoresby Hall. According to Lady Mary, the governess gave her "one of the worst [educations] in the world" by teaching Lady Mary "superstitious tales and false notions". To supplement the instruction of a despised governess, Lady Mary used the well-furnished library to "steal" her education by hiding in the library, between 10 am and 2 pm, and "every afternoon from four to eight". She taught herself Latin, a language usually reserved for men at the time. She secretly got a hold of a "Latin dictionary and grammar" and by the age of thirteen, her handling with the language was on par to most men. Furthermore, she was also a voracious reader. She jotted the list of characters and titles she read into a notebook. Some of the works she read included "plays of Beaumont and Fletcher, Dryden, Rowe, Lee, Otway" and French and English romances, including "Grand Cyrus, Pharamond, Almahide, and Parthenissa." By 1705, at the age of fourteen or fifteen, Mary Pierrepont had written two albums entitled "Poems, Songs &c" filled with poetry, a brief epistolary novel, and a prose-and-verse romance modelled after Aphra Behn's Voyage to the Isle of Love (1684). She also corresponded with two bishops, Thomas Tenison and Gilbert Burnet, who supplemented the instruction of the governess. Overall, Mary impressed her father, who was not a scholar, with her progress.

== Marriage and embassy to Ottoman Empire ==
=== Engagement ===
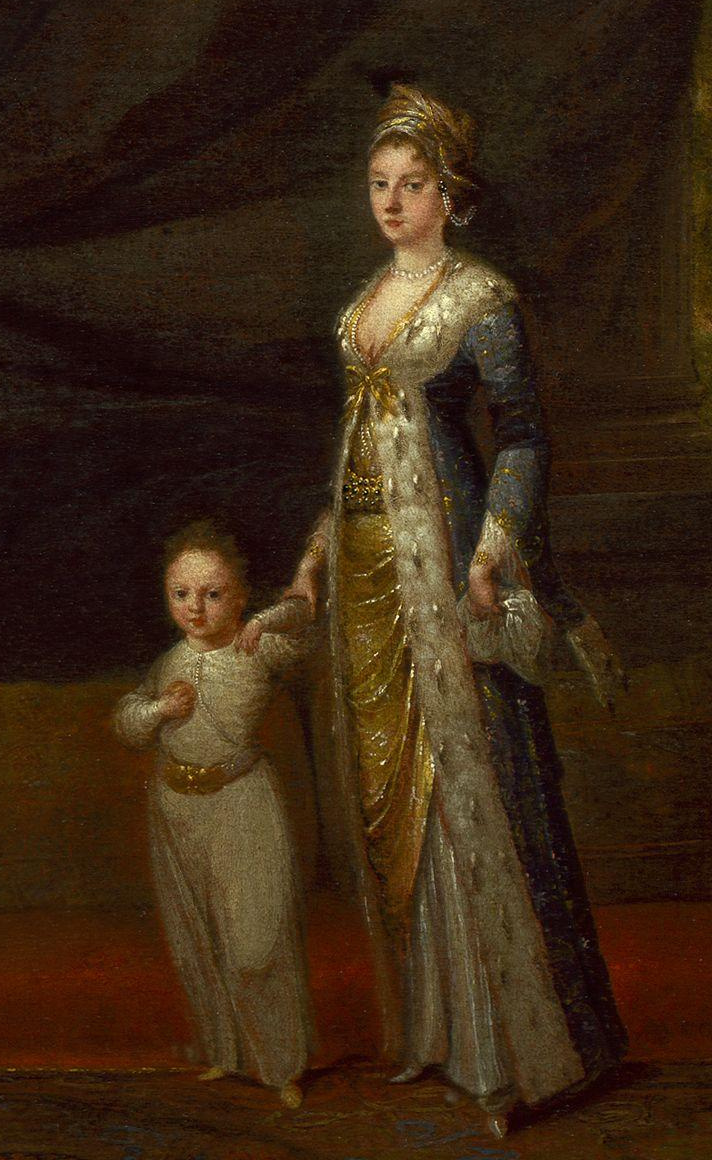
Mary Wortley Montagu with her son Edward, by Jean-Baptiste van Mour

By 1710, Lady Mary had two possible suitors to choose from: Edward Wortley Montagu (born 8 February 1678) and Clotworthy Skeffington. The friendship between Lady Mary and Edward Wortley Montagu, the son of Sidney Wortley Montagu, began through Edward's younger sister Anne Wortley. In London, Anne and Lady Mary met frequently at social functions and exchanged visits to each other's homes. They also communicated through writing, in which they filled their letters with "trivial gossip" and "effusive compliments". After Anne died in November 1709, Lady Mary began conversing with Anne's brother Edward Wortley Montagu. Lady Mary often met Edward at "friends' houses" and "at Court". On 28 March 1710, she wrote the first letter she addressed to Edward. Lady Mary corresponded with Edward Wortley Montagu via letters until 2 May 1711 without her father's permission.

Keeping up with their communication became harder when Lady Mary's father bought a house at Acton, a suburban village famous for its mineral springs. Lady Mary hated the house because it was 'dull and disagreeable,' and it did not have a library in it. A few weeks after moving, Lady Mary had the measles, and she asked her maid to write Edward a letter to tell him about the illness. Soon, there were misunderstandings between Edward and Lady Mary. Edward hurried to Acton. There, he left a note, revealing his love: "I should be overjoyed to hear your Beauty is very much impaired, could I be pleased with anything that would give you displeasure, for it would lessen the number of Admirers." In response, she scolded his indiscretion by saying, "Forgive and forget me." Then, in his reply, Edward stated that "he would deal with her father if he were sure they could be happy together." This reply helped Lady Mary forget her irritation. Lady Mary in Acton and Edward in London kept writing to each other until the early summer of 1710.

Lady Mary's primary concern with her engagement was financial, not romantic. Lady Mary denied transient emotions guiding her life: "I can esteem, I can be a friend, but I don't know whether I can love." Then, after setting forth all her terms, including her deference, she warned to Edward that "Make no answer to this, if you can like me on my own terms" and that his proposals not be made for her. However, these correspondences soon endangered Edward. In one particular letter, Edward wrote, "Her being better in 1710, the consequence of its being known that I write to her." A servant in Lady Mary's household found this letter and gave it to her father; this letter put her father "in the utmost rage." However, Wortley was flattered that Lady Mary "had given the father as 'an artifice to bring the affair to a proper conclusion.'" The next day, Wortley called Lady Mary's father about a formal proposal. Mary's father, now Marquess of Dorchester had insisted on one condition in the marriage contract: "that Wortley's estate be entailed on the first son born to him." However, Wortley refused to do this as it would require £10,000.

Consequently, in order to convince Lady Mary's father, Edward thought of publishing the marriage contract in the Tatler, a British journal. On the Tatler's issue of 18 July, Wortley wrote the following: "Her first lover has ten to one against him. The very hour after he has opened his heart and his rent rolls he is made no other use of but to raise her price...While the poor lover very innocently waits, till the plenipotentiaries at the inns of court have debated about the alliance, all the partisans of the lady throw difficulties in the way, till other offers come in; and the man who came first is not put in possession, until she has been refused by half the town." These arguments did not persuade Lord Dorchester. Even though these negotiations reached an impasse, Lady Mary and Edward continued corresponding with one another.

At the end of March 1711, Lady Mary's father 'determined to end her friendship with Wortley'. Her father summoned her to a conference, forced her to promise not to write, and hustled her to West Dean, Wiltshire. However, Lady Mary broke her promise to tell Wortley about her rights and duty: "Had you had any real Affection for me, you would have long go applied yourself to him, from whose hand only you can receive me." After their exchanges of disagreements and realizing she did not like him, he realized their friendship must end. On 2 May, he replied, "Adieu, Dearest L[ady] M[ary]. This once be assur'd you will not deceive me. I expect no answer." Consequently, Lady Mary did not respond that summer. In that same summer, her father Lord Dorchester decided to find a husband other than Edward Wortley Montagu for his daughter.

Lady Mary's father pressured her to marry Clotworthy Skeffington, the heir to the Irish Viscount Massereene. Skeffington's marriage contract included "an allowance of £500 a year as 'pin-money,' and £1,200 a year if he died." However, she rejected him. Thus, to avoid marriage to Skeffington, she eloped with Montagu. In a letter to Wortley, she wrote, "He [my father] will have a thousand plausible reasons for being irreconcilable, and 'tis very probable the world will be on his side...I shall come to you with only a night-gown and petticoat, and that is all you will get with me. I told a lady of my friends what I intended to do. You will think her a very good friend when I tell you she has proffered to lend us her house if we would come there the first night...If you determine to go to that lady's house, you had better come with a coach and six at seven o'clock to-morrow." The marriage license is dated 17 August 1712, and the marriage probably took place on 23 August 1712.

=== Early married life before travelling to the Ottoman Empire ===
Lady Mary Wortley Montagu and Edward Wortley Montagu spent the first years of their married life in England. She had a son, Edward Wortley Montagu the younger, named after his father Edward Wortley Montagu, born on 16 May 1713, in Westminster. On 13 October 1714, her husband accepted the post of Junior Commissioner of the Treasury. When Lady Mary joined him in Westminster, her wit and beauty soon made her a prominent figure at court. She was among the society of George I and George Augustus, Prince of Wales, and counted amongst her friends Molly Skerritt, Lady Walpole, John, Lord Hervey, Mary Astell, Sarah Churchill, Duchess of Marlborough, Alexander Pope, John Gay, and Abbé Antonio Schinella Conti.

In December 1715, at the age of twenty-six, Lady Mary contracted smallpox. She survived, but while she was ill someone circulated the satirical "court eclogues" she had been writing. One of the poems was read as an attack on Caroline, Princess of Wales, in spite of the fact that the "attack" was voiced by a character who was herself heavily satirised.

=== Husband's assignment to Constantinople ===
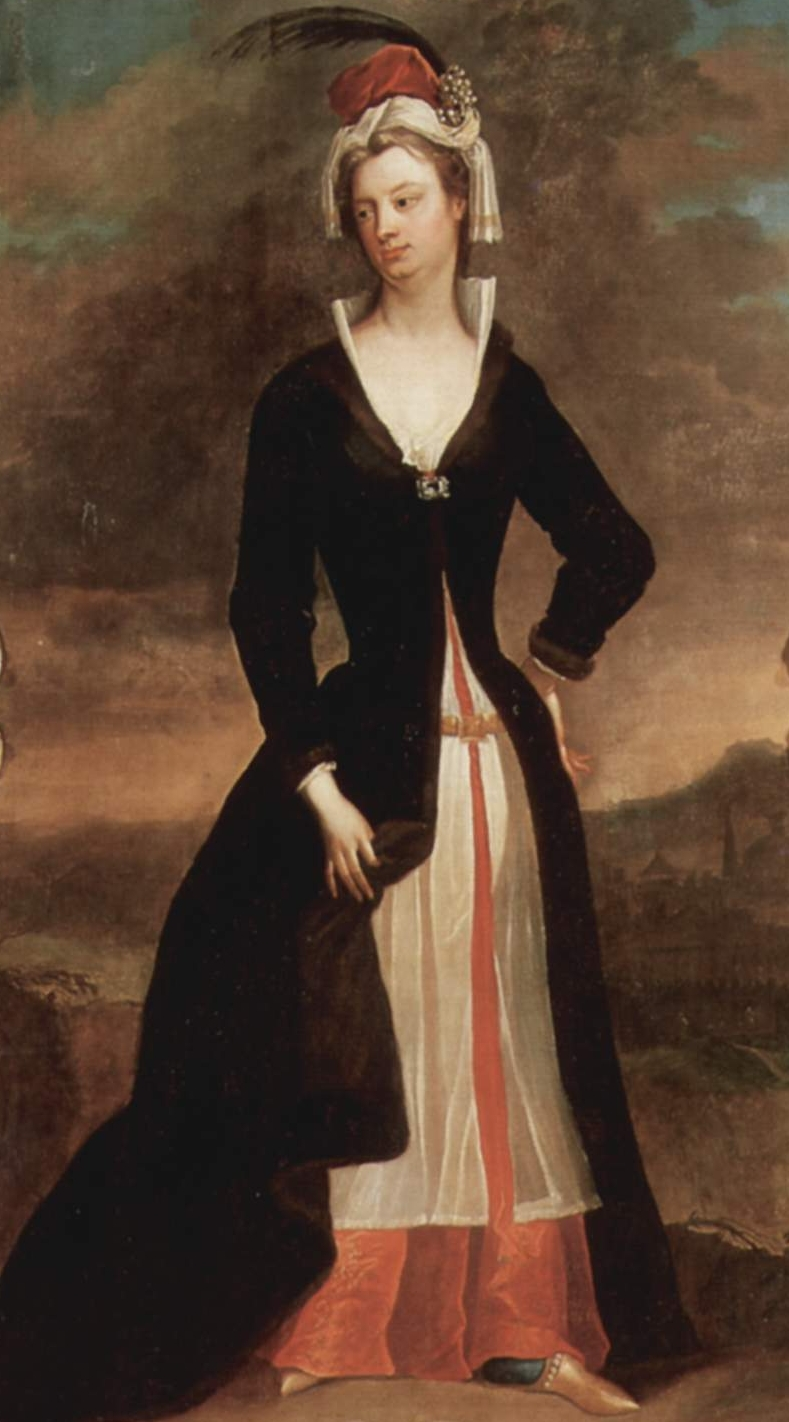
Mary Wortley Montagu, by Charles Jervas, after 1716

In 1716, Edward Wortley Montagu was appointed Ambassador at Constantinople to negotiate an end to the Austro-Turkish War. In August 1716, Lady Mary accompanied him to Vienna, and thence to Adrianople and Constantinople. He was recalled in 1717, but they remained at Constantinople until 1718. While away from England, the Wortley Montagus had a daughter on 19 January 1718, who would grow up to be Mary, Countess of Bute. After an unsuccessful delegation between Austria and the Ottoman Empire, they set sail for England via the Mediterranean, and reached London on 2 October 1718. In the same year, the Austrians and Turkish signed the Treaty of Passarowitz at the conclusion of the Austro-Turkish War.

The story of this voyage and of her observations of Eastern life is told in Letters from Turkey, a series of lively letters full of graphic descriptions; Letters is often credited as being an inspiration for subsequent female travellers and writers, as well as for much Orientalist art. During her visit she was sincerely charmed by the beauty and hospitality of the Ottoman women she encountered. In letters she wrote about how different fashion was as she made her way to Turkey. In a letter to Lady Mar, from Vienna, she wrote: "They build certain fabrics of gauze on their heads, about a yard high, consisting of three or four stories, fortified with numberless yards of heavy ribbon...Their whalebone petticoats outdo ours by several yards' circumference, and cover some acres of ground." Furthermore, she recorded her experiences in a Turkish bath, which are reserved for both diversion and health. In a letter, she wrote, "They [Ottoman women] generally take this diversion once a week, and stay there at least four or five hours, without getting cold immediately coming out of the hot bath into the cold room, which was surprising to me." She also recorded a particularly amusing incident in which a group of Turkish women at a bath in Sofia, horrified by the sight of the stays she was wearing, exclaimed that "they believed I was so locked up in that machine that it was not in my own power to open it, which contrivance they attributed to my husband." Lady Mary wrote about the misconceptions that previous travellers, specifically male travellers, had recorded about the religion, traditions and the treatment of women in the Ottoman Empire. Her gender and class status provided her with access to female spaces that were closed off to males. Her personal interactions with Ottoman women enabled her to provide, in her view, a more accurate account of Turkish women, their dress, habits, traditions, limitations and liberties, at times irrefutably more a critique of the Occident than a praise of the Orient. Montagu also carefully constructed Ottoman female spaces, and her own engagement with Ottoman women, as full of homoerotic desire, which is consistent with the gender and sexual fluidity that characterized much of her life and writings.

== Ottoman smallpox inoculation ==
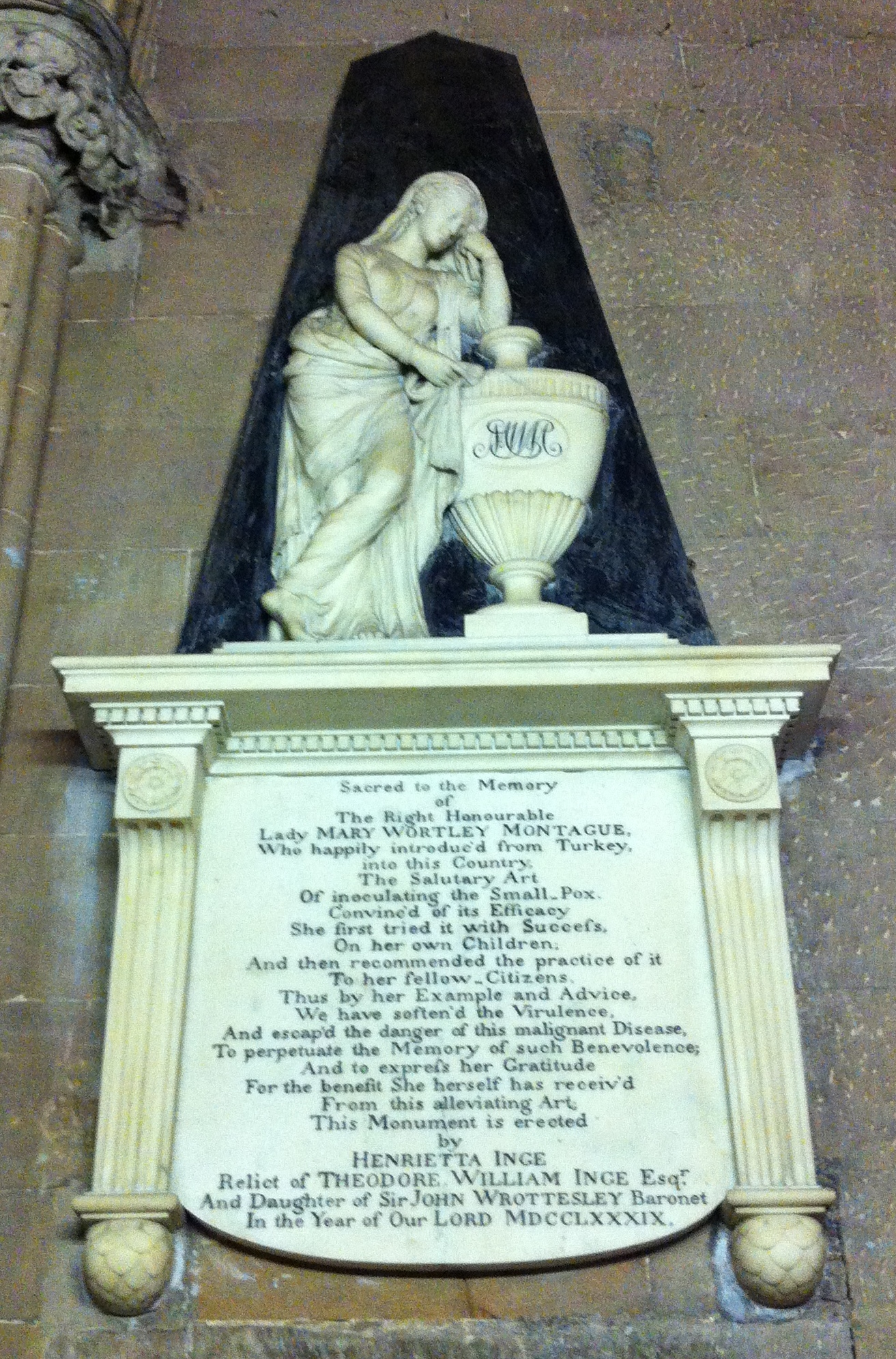
Memorial to the Rt. Hon. Lady Mary Wortley Montagu erected in Lichfield Cathedral by Henrietta Inge

=== Smallpox inoculation ===
In the 18th century, Europeans began an experiment known as inoculation or variolation to prevent, not cure the smallpox. Lady Mary Wortley Montagu defied convention, most memorably by promoting smallpox inoculation to Western medicine after witnessing it during her travels and stay in the Ottoman Empire. Previously, Lady Mary's brother had died of smallpox in 1713, and although Lady Mary recovered from the disease in 1715, it left her with a disfigured face. In the Ottoman Empire, she visited the women in their segregated zenanas, making friends and learning about Turkish customs. There in March 1717, she witnessed the practice of inoculation against smallpox – variolation – which she called engrafting, and wrote home about it in a number of her letters. The most famous of these letters was her "Letter to a Friend" of 1 April 1717. Variolation used live smallpox virus in the pus taken from a mild smallpox blister and introduced it into scratched skin of the arm or leg (the most usual spots) of a previously uninfected person to promote immunity to the disease. Consequently, the inoculate would develop a milder case of smallpox than the one he/she might have contracted.

Lady Mary was eager to spare her children, thus, in March 1718 she had her nearly five-year-old son, Edward, inoculated there with the help of Embassy surgeon Charles Maitland. In fact, her son was the "first English person to undergo the operation." In a letter to a friend in England, Montagu wrote, "There is a set of old women [here], who make it their business to perform the operation, every autumn...when then great heat is abated...thousands undergo this operation...[and there] is not one example of anyone that has died in it." Afterwards, she updated the status of Edward to her husband: "The Boy was engrafted last Tuesday, and is at this time singing and playing, and very impatient for his supper. I pray God my next may give as good an account of him." On her return to London, she enthusiastically promoted the procedure, but encountered a great deal of resistance from the medical establishment, because it was a folk treatment process.

In April 1721, when a smallpox epidemic struck England, she had her daughter inoculated by Maitland, the same physician who had inoculated her son at the Embassy in Turkey, and publicised the event. This was the first such operation done in England. She persuaded Caroline of Ansbach, the Princess of Wales, to test the treatment. In August 1721, seven prisoners at Newgate Prison awaiting execution were offered the chance to undergo variolation instead of execution: they all survived and were released. Despite this, controversy over smallpox inoculation intensified. However Caroline, Princess of Wales, was convinced of its value. The Princess's two daughters Amelia and Caroline were successfully inoculated in April 1722 by French-born surgeon Claudius Amyand. In response to the general fear of inoculation, Lady Mary, under a pseudonym, wrote and published an article describing and arguing in favour of inoculation in September 1722. Later, other royal families followed Montagu's example. For instance, in 1768, Catherine the Great of Russia had herself and her son, the future Tsar Paul, inoculated. The Russians continued to refine the process.

Nevertheless, inoculation was not always a safe process; inoculates developed a real case of smallpox and could infect others. The inoculation resulted in a "small number of deaths and complications, including serious infections." Subsequently, Edward Jenner, who was 13 years old when Lady Mary died in 1762, developed the much safer technique of vaccination using cowpox instead of smallpox. Jenner's method involves "engrafting lymph taken from a pustulate of cowpox on the hand of a milkmaid into the arm of an inoculate." Jenner first tested his method on James Phipps, an eight-year-old boy, and when Phipps did not have any reaction after the procedure, Jenner claimed that his procedure "bestowed immunity against smallpox." Then, after spending the next few years experimenting his new procedure, he discovered that his hypothesis was correct. As vaccination gained acceptance, variolation gradually fell out of favour. In the 20th century, a concerted campaign by the WHO to eradicate smallpox via vaccination would succeed by 1979. Lady Mary Wortley Montagu's introduction of smallpox inoculation had ultimately led to the development of vaccines, and the later eradication of smallpox.

== Later years ==
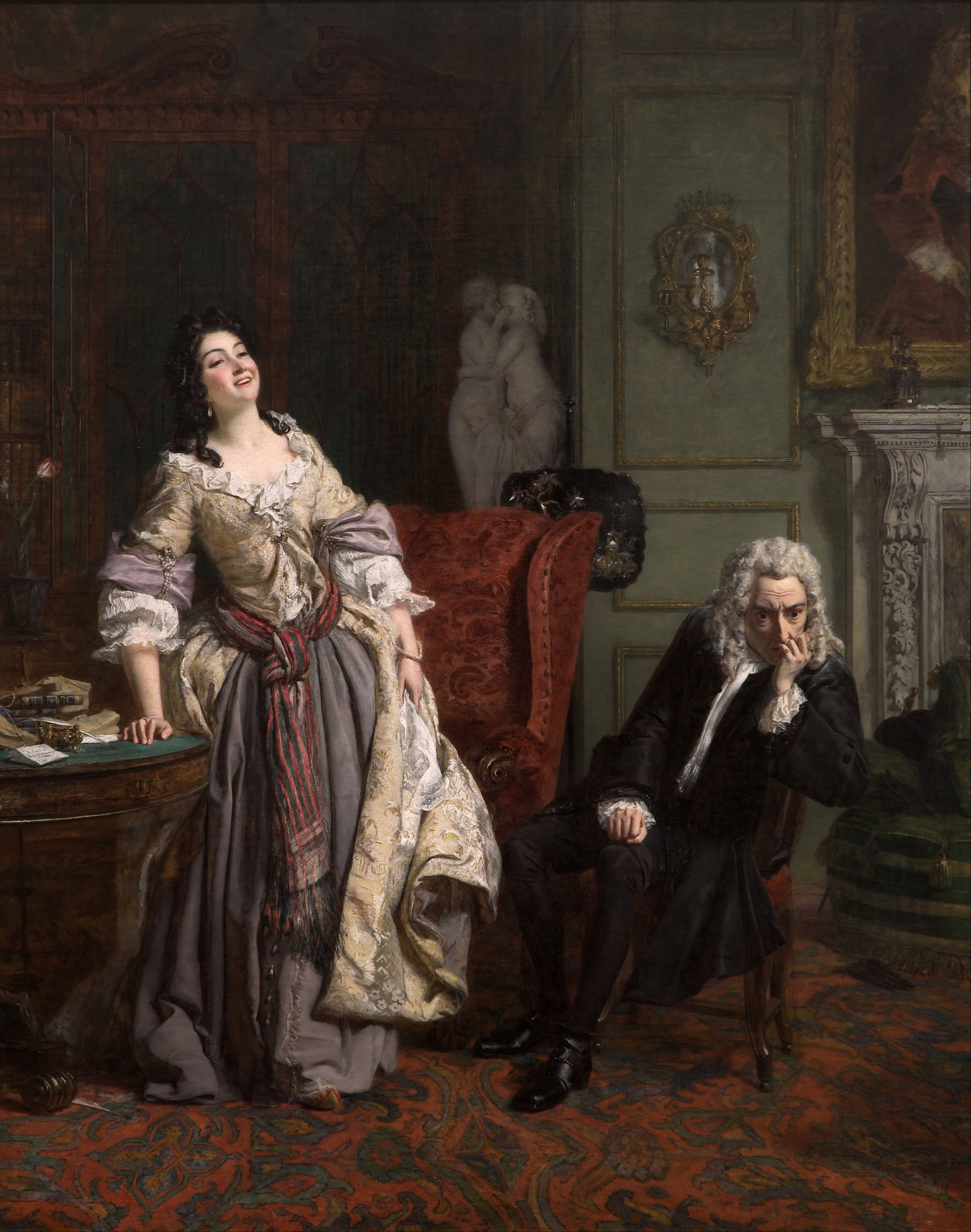
Alexander Pope declared his love to Lady Mary, who responded with laughter. 1852 genre painting The Rejected Poet by William Powell Frith

After returning to England, Lady Mary took less interest in court compared to her earlier years. Instead, she was more focused on the upbringing of her children, reading, writing, and editing her travel letters—which she then chose not to publish.

Before starting for the East, Lady Mary Wortley Montagu had met Alexander Pope, and during her Embassy travels with her husband, they wrote each other a series of letters. While Pope may have been fascinated by her wit and elegance, Lady Mary's replies to his letters reveal that she was not equally smitten. Very few letters passed between them after Lady Mary's return to England, and various reasons have been suggested for the subsequent estrangement. In 1728, Pope attacked Lady Mary in his Dunciad, which inaugurated a decade in which most of his publications made some sort of allegation against her.

=== Difficulties with family ===
Lady Mary went through a series of trials with her children. In 1726 and 1727, Lady Mary's son Edward ran away from Westminster School several times. He was then entrusted to a tutor with strict orders to keep him abroad. In later years, her son managed to return to England without permission and continued to have a strained relationship with both his parents.

In the summer of 1736, Lady Mary's daughter, also named Mary, fell in love with John Stuart, 3rd Earl of Bute, but he had little fortune; Lady Mary warned her daughter about the disadvantages of living in poverty. Lady Mary similarly had concerns regarding the 1734 marriage of her niece Lady Mary Pierrepont (1711–1795) who had eloped with Philip Meadows, Deputy Ranger of Richmond Park saying that her "ruin" was due to the "silly good people that had the care of her".

In August 1736, Lady Mary's daughter married Bute, despite her parents' disapproval of the match. Later, Lady Mary wrote to Lord Gower, 1st Earl Gower, about her daughter's disobedience. In response, Lord Gower tried to console Lady Mary: "I hope by her future conducts she will atone for her past, and that choice will prove more happy than you and Mr. Wortley expect."

In the same year, Lady Mary met and fell in love with Count Francesco Algarotti, who competed with an equally smitten John Hervey for her affections.

Lady Mary wrote many letters to Francesco Algarotti in English and in French after his departure from England in September 1736. In July 1739, Lady Mary departed England without her husband ostensibly for health reasons, possibly from a disfiguring skin disease, and declared her intentions to winter in the south of France; after she left England, she and her husband never met again. In reality, she left to visit and live with Algarotti in Venice. Their relationship ended in 1741 after Lady Mary and Algarotti were both on a diplomatic mission in Turin. Lady Mary stayed abroad and travelled extensively. After travelling to Venice, Florence, Rome, Genoa and Geneva, she finally settled in Avignon in 1742. She left Avignon in 1746 for Brescia, where she fell ill and stayed for nearly a decade, leaving for Lovere in 1754. In the summer of 1756, Lady Mary travelled to Venice for an undisclosed business errand. After August 1756, she resided in Venice and Padua and saw Algarotti again in November. Throughout the time, Lady Mary exchanged letters with her daughter, Lady Bute, discussing topics such as philosophy, literature, and the education of girls, as well as conveying details of her geographical and social surroundings.

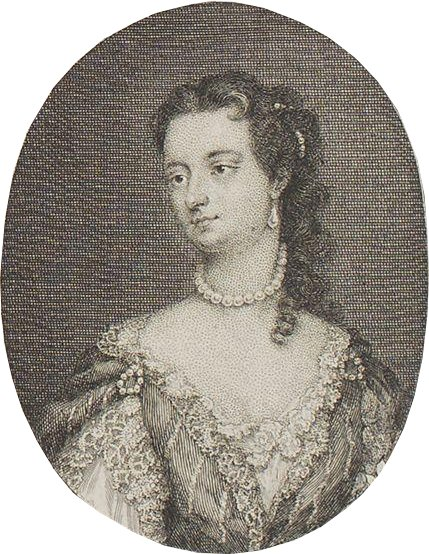
Mary Wortley Montagu in 1739

Lady Mary received news of the death and burial at Wortley of her husband Edward Wortley Montagu in January 1761. As soon as she learned of her husband's death, Lady Mary left Venice for England. She had a self-imposed exile because of her strained relationship with her husband, but her return made sense because she wanted to see her daughter and her grandchildren before she died. On 1 September 1761, she began her journey back home; she decided to go through Germany and Holland because France, which was deemed the easier route, was at war. However, the journey was dangerous and exhausting. When she reached Augsburg on 1 October, she wrote to Sir James and Lady Frances Stuart that "she hoped to meet them in Holland." She recorded her perils and fatigues to Sir James in a letter: "I am dragging my ragged remnant of life to England. The wind and the tide are against me; how far I have strength to struggle against both, I know not." While detained at Rotterdam, she handed her Embassy Letters to the Reverend Benjamin Sowden of Rotterdam, for safe keeping and "to be dispos'd of as he thinks proper." After she left Rotterdam on 12 December, a hard, impenetrable frost hindered her voyage. Towards the end of the month, she sailed for England, but a mountainous sea obstructed the passage and the captain returned to harbor. On the next attempt a few days later, Lady Mary reached London in January 1762. After arriving in London, Lady Mary rented a house in Great George Street, Hanover Square, and her daughter and grandchildren often visited her.

In June 1762, it became known that Lady Mary was suffering from cancer. Even though she tried to conceal her illness from her family as long as possible, she grew rapidly weaker that month. She wrote her last letter but with difficulty on 2 July to Lady Frances Stuart; in this letter, she wrote "I have been ill a long time, and am now so bad I am little capable of writing, but I would not pass in your opinion as either stupid or ungrateful. My heart is always warm in your service, and I am always told your affairs shall be taken care of." Lady Frances's son was in London, and when he visited Lady Mary's house, he was summoned to her bedroom where he was surrounded by her relatives, including Lord and Lady Bute. Lady Mary then ordered her relatives to leave the room, saying of Lady Frances's son, "My dear young friend has come to see me before I die, and I desire to be left alone with him." She died on 21 August 1762 at her house in Great George Street, and was buried in Grosvenor Chapel the day after she died.

== Important works and literary place ==
Although Lady Mary Wortley Montagu is now best known for her Turkish Embassy Letters, she wrote poetry and essays as well. A number of Lady Mary's poems and essays were printed in her lifetime, either without or with her permission, in newspapers, in miscellanies, and independently.

Montagu did not intend to publish her poetry, but it did circulate widely, in manuscript, among members of her own social circle. Lady Mary was highly suspicious of any idealizing literary language. She wrote most often in heroic couplets, a serious poetic form to employ, and, according to Susan Staves, "excelled at answer poems". Some of her widely anthologized poems include "Constantinople" and "Epistle from Mrs. Yonge to her Husband". "Constantinople", written in January 1718, is a poem in heroic couplets describing Britain and Turkey through human history, and representing the states of mind "of knaves, coxcombs, the mob, and party zealous—all characteristic of the London of her time". "Epistle from Mrs. Yonge to her Husband", written in 1724, stages a letter from Mrs. Yonge to her libertine husband and exposes the social double standard which led to the shaming and distress of Mrs. Yonge after her divorce. In 1737 and 1738, Lady Mary published anonymously a political periodical called the Nonsense of Common-Sense, supporting the Robert Walpole government. The title was a reference to a journal of the liberal opposition entitled Common Sense. She wrote six Town Eclogues and other poems.

=== The Turkish Embassy Letters ===
Lady Mary wrote notable letters describing her travels through Europe and the Ottoman Empire; these appeared after her death in three volumes. Although not published during her lifetime, her letters from Turkey were clearly intended for print. She revised them extensively and gave a transcript to the Reverend Benjamin Sowden, a British clergyman, in Rotterdam in 1761. Sowden also lent the book to two English travellers, including Thomas Becket. Furthermore, during that night, the travellers made copies of her letters. After the travellers returned the book, Sowden handed the book to Lady Mary's son-in-law, Lord Bute (later Prime Minister), in exchange for £200 (equivalent to £34,000 in 2025).

In 1763 in London, the year after her death, Becket and De Hondt published this error-laden version manuscript in three volumes, entitled Letters of the Right Honourable Lady My W—y M----e: Written, during her Travels in Europe, Asia and Africa, to Persons of Distinction, Men of Letters, &c. in different Parts of Europe; Which contain, Among other curious Relations, Accounts of the Policy and Manners of the Turks, commonly referred to as the Embassy Letters or Turkish Embassy Letters because it was "composed during and after Montagu's journey through Europe to Constantinople in the company of her husband." The first edition of the book sold out; in fact, the Critical Review newspaper editor, Tobias Smollett, wrote that the letters were "never equaled by any letter-writer of any sex, age or nation" and Voltaire also had high praise of these letters. Four years later in 1767, editor John Cleland added five spurious letters, along with previous printed essays and verses, to the previous edition of the book.

Despite the immediate success following the publication of Turkish Embassy Letters, Lady Mary's daughter, Mary Stuart, Countess of Bute, was furious and worried about how an unauthorized publication would impact the family's reputation. One of the manuscript volumes that others found was Lady Mary's famous diary, and Lady Bute did not have any knowledge of this existence until a few days before her mother's death. After she received these volumes, Lady Bute "kept it always under lock and key, and though she often looked over it herself, and read passages aloud to her daughters and friends, excepting the first five or six copy-books, which at a late period, she permitted Lady Louisa Stuart to peruse alone, upon condition that nothing should be transcribed." Lady Louisa, the youngest of Lady Bute's daughters, was scolded for reading books and wanting to be like her grandmother. Later, Lady Louisa followed her grandmother's footsteps and became a writer. Then when Lady Bute felt that the end of her life was near, in 1794, she burnt the diary that her mother kept since her marriage. She chose to burn the diary because Lady Bute always spoke to her mother with great respect, and she feared the possibility of a scandal.

According to O'Quinn, although The Turkish Embassy Letters has been considered one of the best literary works published in the eighteenth century, the work has not been as appreciated as those published by her male peers, such as Alexander Pope and Horace Walpole. She was the "target of vicious attacks" from printing presses and male peers. Although she describes her travels through Europe to the Ottoman Empire in The Turkish Embassy Letters to her correspondents, very few of the letters survived, and the letters in the book may not be accurate transcriptions of the actual correspondence. According to Daniel O'Quinn, the book was not a culmination of facts but of opinions, and there must be some filtering during the editing processes. Furthermore, to avoid public censure, Montagu used pseudonyms, such as "a Turkey merchant" and "Lady President", in her publications. Lastly, Montagu's The Turkish Embassy Letters was published posthumously — Walpole affirmed that it was Montagu's deathbed wish to get the letters published.

An important early letter was published, probably without Montagu's consent, titled "The Genuine Copy of a Letter Written From Constantinople by an English Lady" in 1719. Both in this letter and in the Turkish Embassy Letters more broadly, particularly in the letters about her host, the scholar Achmet Beg, Montagu participates in a wider English dialogue on Enlightenment ideas about religion, particularly deism, and their overlap with Islamic theology. Montagu, along with many others, including the freethinking scholar Henry Stubbe, celebrated Islam for what they saw as its rational approach to theology, for its strict monotheism, and for its teaching and practice around religious tolerance. In short, Montagu and other thinkers in this tradition saw Islam as a source of Enlightenment, as evidenced in her calling the Qur'an "the purest morality delivered in the very best language" By comparison, Montagu dedicated large portions of the Turkish Embassy Letters to criticizing Catholic religious practices, particularly Catholic beliefs around sainthood, miracles, and religious relics, which she frequently excoriated. In relation to these practices, she wrote, "I cannot fancy there is anything new in letting you know that priests can lie, and the mob believe all over the world."

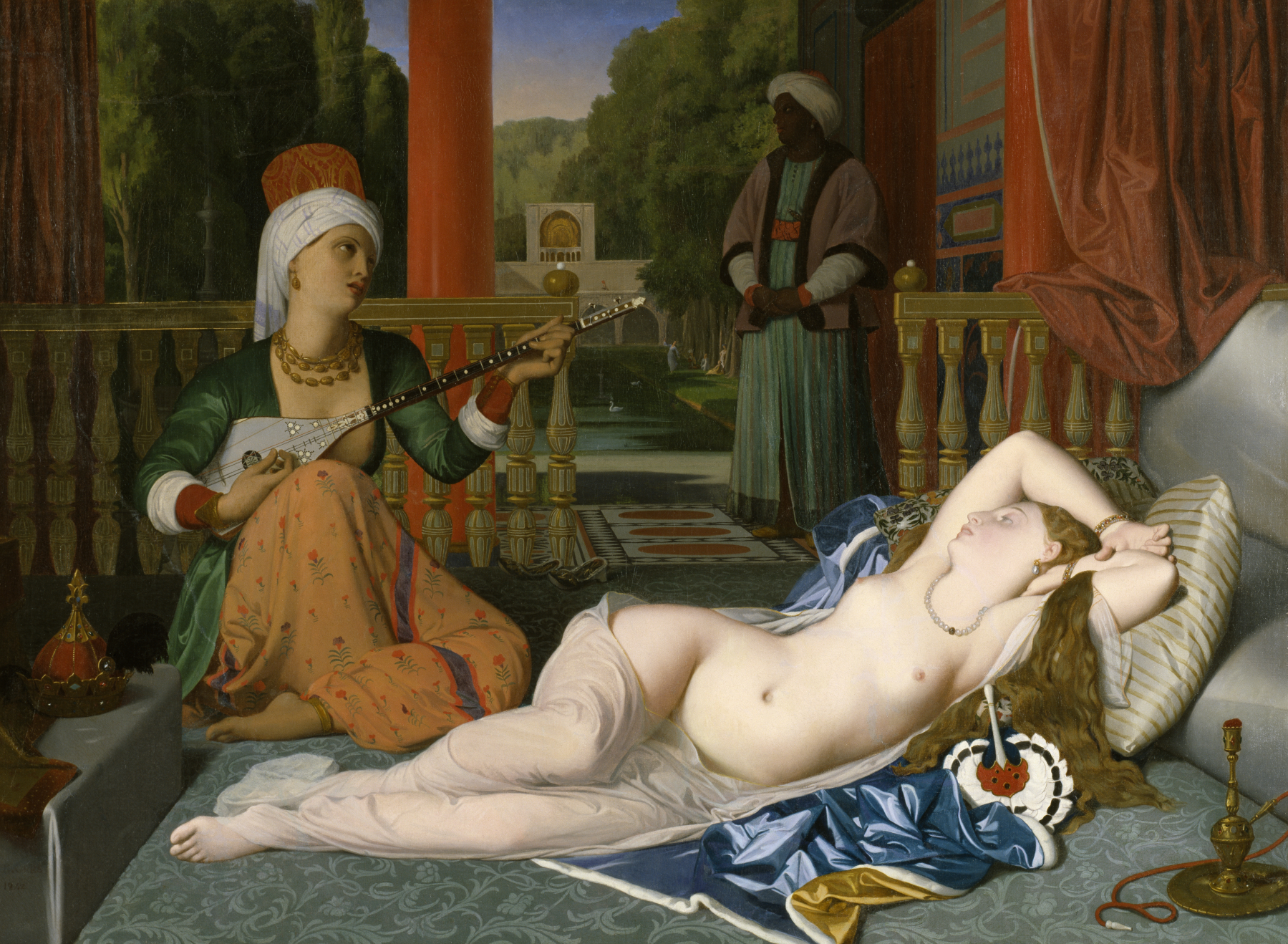
A painting by Jean Auguste Dominique Ingres that was inspired by Mary Wortley Montagu's detailed descriptions of nude Oriental beauties

Montagu's Turkish letters were to prove an inspiration to later generations of European women travellers and writers. In particular, Montagu staked a claim to the authority of women's writing, due to their ability to access private homes and female-only spaces where men were not permitted. The title of her published letters is "Sources that Have Been Inaccessible to Other Travellers". The letters themselves frequently draw attention to the fact that they present a different, and Montagu asserts more accurate description than that provided by previous (male) travellers: "You will perhaps be surpriz'd at an Account so different from what you have been entertained with by the common Voyage-writers who are very fond of speaking of what they don't know." In general, Montagu dismisses the quality of European travel literature of the 18th century as nothing more than "trite observations...superficial...[of] boys [who] only remember where they met with the best wine or the prettiest women". Montagu writes about the "warmth and civility" of Ottoman women. She describes the hammam, known to her readers as a 'Turkish bath', "as a space of urbane homosociality, free of cruel satire and disdain". She mentions that "hammam are remarkable for their undisguised admiration of the women's beauty and demeanor", which creates a space for female authority. Montagu provides an intimate description of the women's bathhouse in Sofia, in which she derides male descriptions of the bathhouse as a site for unnatural sexual practices, instead insisting that it was "the Women's coffee house, where all the news of the Town is told, Scandal invented, etc." Montagu's reference to "women's coffee house" represents the political and social freedom that women had access to in the Ottoman Empire during the 18th century. Even though Montagu refused to undress for the bath at first, the girls managed to persuade her to "open my shirt, and show them my stays, which satisfied them very well". In one letter to her sister Lady Mar, she wrote, "nothing will surprise you more than the sight of my person, as I am now in my Turkish habit."

During Montagu's time in the Ottoman Empire, she saw and wrote extensively concerning the practise of slavery along with the treatment of slaves by the Turks. Montagu wrote many letters with positive descriptions of the various enslaved people that she saw in the elite circles of Istanbul, including eunuchs and large collections of serving and dancing girls dressed in expensive outfits. In one of her letters written back home, famously from the interior of a bath house, she dismisses the idea that slaves of the Ottoman elite should be figures to be pitied. In response to her visit to the slave market in Istanbul, she wrote "you will imagine me half a Turk when I don't speak of it with the same horror other Christians have done before me, but I cannot forbear applauding the humanity of the Turks to those creatures. They are never ill-used, and their slavery is in my opinion no worse than servitude all over the world."

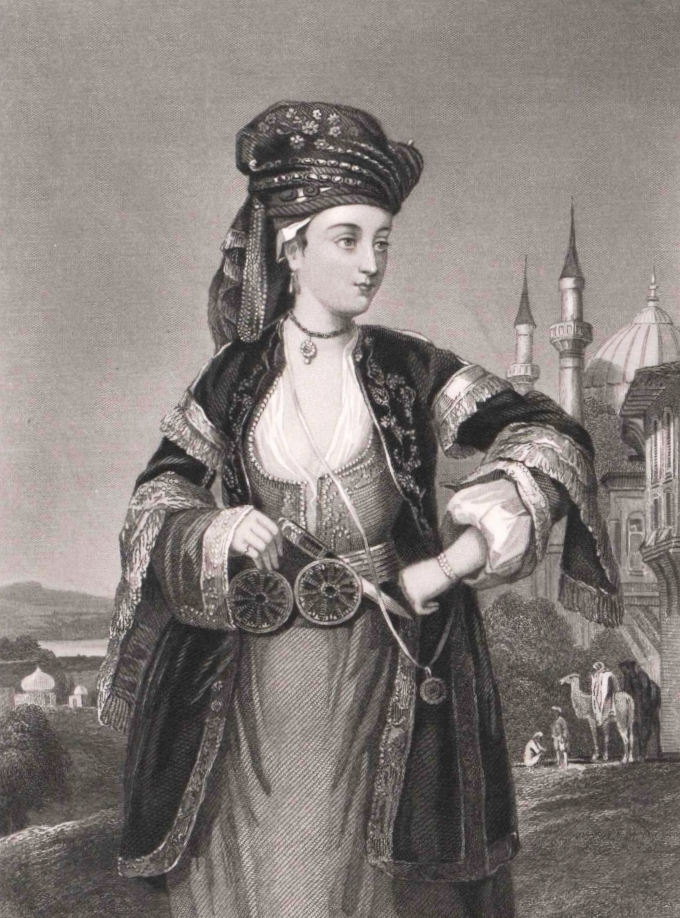
Mary Wortley Montagu in Turkish dress.

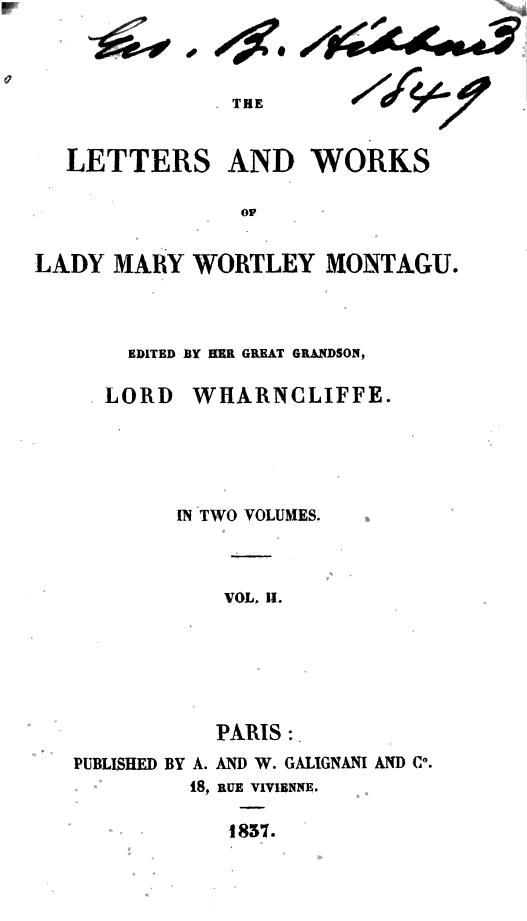
The title page of Lady Mary Wortley Montagu's The Letters and Works of Lady Mary Wortley Montagu, published in 1837

Montagu's Turkish letters were frequently cited by Western female travellers, more than a century after her journey. Such writers cited Montagu's assertion that women travellers could gain an intimate view of Turkish life that was not available to their male counterparts. However, they also added corrections or elaborations to her observations.

=== Other works and legacy ===
In 1739, a book was printed by an unknown author under the pseudonym "Sophia, a person of quality", titled Woman not Inferior to Man. This book is often attributed to Lady Mary.

Her Letters and Works were published in 1837. Montagu's octogenarian granddaughter Lady Louisa Stuart contributed to this, anonymously, an introductory essay titled "Biographical Anecdotes of Lady M. W. Montagu", from which it was clear that Stuart was troubled by her grandmother's focus on sexual intrigues and did not see Lady Mary Wortley Montagu's Account of the Court of George I at his Accession as history. However, Montagu's historical observations, both in the "Anecdotes" and the Turkish Embassy Letters, prove quite accurate when put in context.

During the twentieth century, Lady Mary's letters were edited separately from her essays, poems and plays. Lady Mary corresponded with Anne Wortley and wrote courtship letters to her future husband Edward Wortley Montagu, as well as love letters to Francesco Algarotti. She corresponded with notable writers, intellectuals and aristocrats of her day. She wrote gossip letters and letters berating the vagaries of fashionable people to her sister Frances, Countess of Mar, the wife of the Jacobite Earl of Mar. They met when the Wortleys visited Paris on 29 September 1718. During her visit, Montagu observed the beauties and behaviors of Parisian women. She wrote "their hair cut short and curled round their faces, loaded with powder that makes it look like white wool!" In one of their correspondences, Lady Mary informed her sister of the 'surprising death' of her father. Furthermore, they exchanged intellectual letters with Montagu's daughter, Mary, Lady Bute. Lady Mary and Lady Mar discontinued their correspondence in 1727.

Montagu is commemorated by an obelisk on the Wentworth Castle estate in Yorkshire. It was raised by William Wentworth, 2nd Earl of Strafford and is the only known garden feature created in 18th century England which celebrates "the intellectual achievements of a woman". Also known as the Sun Monument, it carries an inscription: "TO THE MEMORY OF THE / RT HON LADY MARY / WORTLEY MONTAGU / WHO IN THE YEAR 1720 / INTRODUCED INOCULATION / OF THE SMALLPOX / INTO ENGLAND FROM TURKEY".

Despite the availability of her work in print and the revival efforts of feminist scholars, the complexity and brilliance of Lady Mary Wortley Montagu's extensive body of work has not yet been recognized to the fullest.
