= Turkish Embassy Letters =

Letter collection by Lady Mary Wortley Montagu

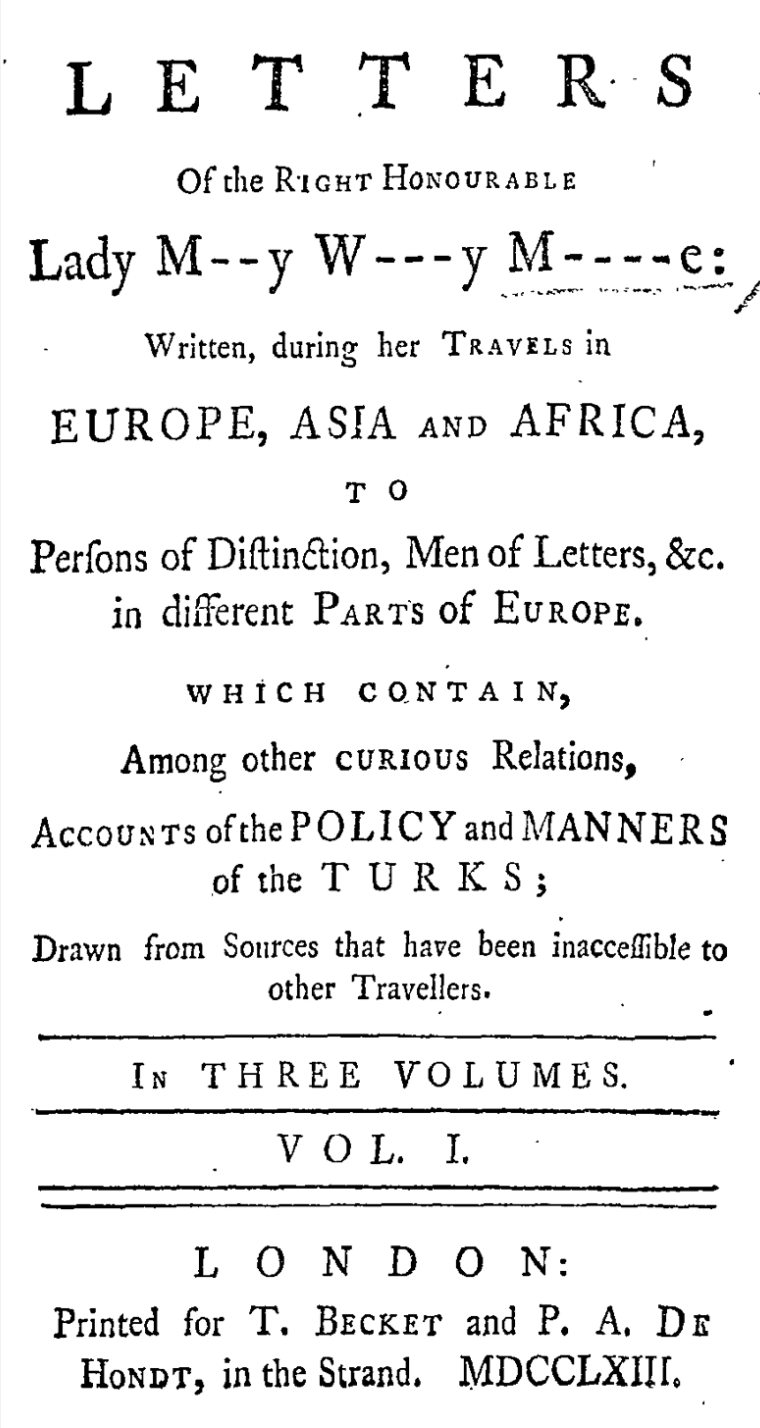
- Title page of the first edition
- Author: Lady Mary Wortley Montagu
- Publication date: 1763

The Turkish Embassy Letters, or Letters from the Levant During the Embassy to Constantinople (Note: Full title: Letters of the Honourable Lady M--y W---y M----e; written, during her travels in Europe, Asia and Africa, to Persons of Distinction, Men of Letters, &c. in different Parts of Europe. Which contain, among other curious Relations, accounts of the Policy and Manners of the Turks; Drawn from Sources that have been inaccessible to other Travellers) are a letter collection of Lady Mary Wortley Montagu's reflections on her travels through Europe and the Ottoman Empire between 1716 and 1718. She collected and revised them throughout her life, circulating the manuscripts among friends, and they were first published in 1763 after her death.

== Background ==
Mary and Edward Wortley Montagu, both of wealthy and aristocratic families, married in 1712, after a long courtship. Mary played an active role in furthering Edward's ambitious political career. In 1716, Edward Montagu was sent to offer British mediation to mitigate the brewing war between Austria and the Turks. The Montagus travelled through Hellevoetsluis, Rotterdam, The Hague, Nijmegen, Cologne, Nuremberg, Regensburg, Prague, Brunswick, and Hanover, and then in Vienna Montagu attempted his task, but had little impact, and war broke out in April 1716. On 10 May 1716, he was appointed as the Ambassador Extraordinary to the Sublime Porte, charged with pursuing the ongoing negotiations between the Ottomans and the Habsburg Empire, and expected this to be a twenty-year posting. He remained in Vienna for some months before he travelled along the Danube to the Ottoman Empire, arriving in Adrianople on 13 March 1717. However, he continued to have little success and was recalled in October 1717, before he had been fully accredited as Ambassador.

A new ambassador, Abraham Stanyan, previously head of mission in Vienna, was appointed in October 1717, but did not arrive at Adrianople until 24 April 1718. Meanwhile, the Montagus remained in Constantinople, where their daughter Mary was born in January 1718. After leaving there in July, they travelled in the Near East before returning to England through Italy and France.

== Contents ==
The Turkish Embassy Letters consist of fifty-eight letters addressed to friends and relatives from various places on their journey. Twenty-two letters describe their travels in Europe on the way to the Ottoman Empire, twenty-seven were written from there, in Adrianople or Constantinople, and nine are from their return journey. Although the majority of the letters were written in Europe, Montagu's descriptions of the Ottoman world gained the most attention, especially her descriptions of women-only spaces, such as baths.

== Editions ==
- James Augustus St. John, ed., Letters from the Levant, During the Embassy to Constantinople, 1716–18 (1838)
- A. W. Lawrence, ed., The Travel Letters of Lady Mary Wortley Montagu (London: Jonathan Cape, 1930)
- Robert Halsband, ed., The Complete Letters of Lady Mary Wortley Montagu, volume 1 1708–1720 (Oxford University Press, 1965)
- Teresa Heffernan, Daniel O'Quinn, eds. The Turkish Embassy Letters (Broadview Editions, 2012)

== Bibliography ==
=== References ===
- Lewis Melville, Lady Mary Wortley Montagu: Her Life and Letters (1689–1762), London: Hutchinson & Co., 1925
- Hall, Jordan; Sagal, Anna K.; Zold, Elizabeth (2017). "Lady Mary Wortley Montagu and the Turkish Embassy Letters: A Survey of Contemporary Criticism". Literature Compass. 14 (10) e12405. doi:10.1111/lic3.12405.
- O'Loughlin, Katrina (2018). "'A very diligent curiosity': Lady Mary Wortley Montagu's Embassy Letters". Women, writing, and travel in the eighteenth century. Cambridge, United Kingdom. ISBN 978-1-108-59992-4. OCLC 1038481886.
- Grundy, Isobel (1999). Lady Mary Wortley Montagu. Oxford: Oxford University Press. ISBN 978-0198112891.
