= Alice Blunden =

Case of premature burial in 1674

Alice Blunden (died 1674), of Basingstoke, was the subject of a notorious early modern account of premature burial.

== Marriage ==
Alice Davies, the daughter of John Davies, married William Blunden of Basingstoke on 3 November 1656. The Blundens were a well-established local family who make regular appearances in the municipal records from the 16th century onwards. In 1671 the couple were plaintiffs in litigation brought in relation to property in Basingstoke but Mrs Blunden's notability rests entirely upon the circumstances of her death.

== Death ==
A brief account was published in 1748, but the only detailed description appears in a tract which can be dated from internal evidence to the year 1675. The tract is quoted in its entirety in Baigent and Millard's History of Basingstoke.

According to this text, William Blunden was a maltster and his wife was “a fat, gross woman”, who “had accustomed herself many times to drink brandy”. One evening she imbibed a large quantity of poppy-water and fell into a deep sleep from which she could not be wakened. An apothecary was consulted and it was concluded that Alice had died. William had urgent business in London and left instructions that her funeral should be deferred until his return. However, Alice's relations considered that “the season of the year being hot, and the corpse fat, it would be impossible to keep her”, and she was accordingly buried without further delay. A few days later, boys who had been playing nearby reported hearing a voice from the grave. They were initially disbelieved but the voice was heard by others and the grave was opened. The body was found to be “most lamentably beaten”, which was thought to be the result of injuries inflicted by Alice on herself in her confinement. Being unable to detect any continuing signs of life, those present at the scene lowered Alice back into the grave overnight, with a view to summoning the coroner the next day. On their return, “they found she had torn off great part of her winding sheet, scratched herself first in several places, and ripped off her own mouth, it was all in gore blood.” She was at least definitely dead. The coroner found that her life had been thrown away and bound over several persons to appear at the Lent Assizes of 1675. Ultimately, no individuals were convicted but “the Town had a considerable fine set upon them for their neglect”.

A critical view of the accuracy of this narrative (and also of other accounts of premature burial) is taken by Professor Jan Bondeson in Buried Alive: the terrifying history of our most primal fear. The parish register merely records: "Mr. William Blunden's wife buried July 15th, 1674".

== Posterity ==
William died on 13 March 1701. He and Alice had had two children, William and Elizabeth. The younger William's daughter and heiress, also Elizabeth, married Sir Charles Gounter Nicoll; their only child, Frances, married William Legge, 2nd Earl of Dartmouth.
