= Armstead Parker =

British Tory politician

Member of Parliament (MP) for **Grantham**
- In office 1727–1734

Personal details
- Born: 7 May 1696
- Died: 10 March 1765 (aged 68)
- Occupation: Politician

Armstead Parker (c.1699–1777) of Burghberry Manor, Peterborough, Northamptonshire was a British Tory politician who sat in the House of Commons between 1734 and 1768.

Parker was the only son of Charles Parker MP for Peterborough, and his wife Katherine Wilson. In 1730 his father died and he succeeded to Burghberry and the electoral interest. He married Elizabeth Rogers, daughter of Francis Rogers, keeper of the wardrobe to James II, on 28 January 1738.

Parker was returned as Tory Member of Parliament for Peterborough at a by-election on 29 January 1734 on his family interest, and followed it up with successful return in a contest at the 1734 British general election. He voted against the Government. He did not stand at the 1741 British general election but was returned unopposed in succession to William FitzWilliam, 3rd Earl FitzWilliam at a by-election on 3 May 1742. He continued to vote against the Government until 1746, when he supported them on the Hanoverians He did not stand in 1747.

Parker was next returned unopposed for Peterborough at the 1761 British general election on his family interest. He appears to have supported both the Bute and Grenville Administrations. Lord Sandwich described him to Grenville as a very independent man and advised he should not be neglected. Parker voted with the Opposition against the repeal of the Stamp Act on 22 February 1766. No other vote by him is recorded, and there is no evidence of his having spoken in Parliament. Before the 1768 British general election he decided not to stand in favour of his son who then withdrew before the poll in return for £1000.

Parker died on 5 February 1777 leaving a son and two daughters.

Parliament of Great Britain
Preceded by Charles Gounter-Nicoll; Joseph Banks	Member of Parliament for Peterborough; 1734– 1741; With: Joseph Banks; Sir Edward Wortley Montagu 1734	Succeeded by William FitzWilliam, 3rd Earl FitzWilliam; Sir Edward Wortley Montagu
Preceded by William FitzWilliam, 3rd Earl FitzWilliam; Sir Edward Wortley Montagu	Member of Parliament for Peterborough; 1742–1747; With: Sir Edward Wortley Montagu	Succeeded by Sir Matthew Lamb, 1st Baronet; Sir Edward Wortley Montagu
Preceded by Sir Matthew Lamb, 1st Baronet; Sir Edward Wortley Montagu	Member of Parliament for Peterborough; 1761–1768; With: Sir Matthew Lamb, 1st Baronet	Succeeded by Sir Matthew Lamb, 1st Baronet; Matthew Wyldbore
