= Kelemen Mikes =

Transylvanian-born Hungarian political figure and essayist

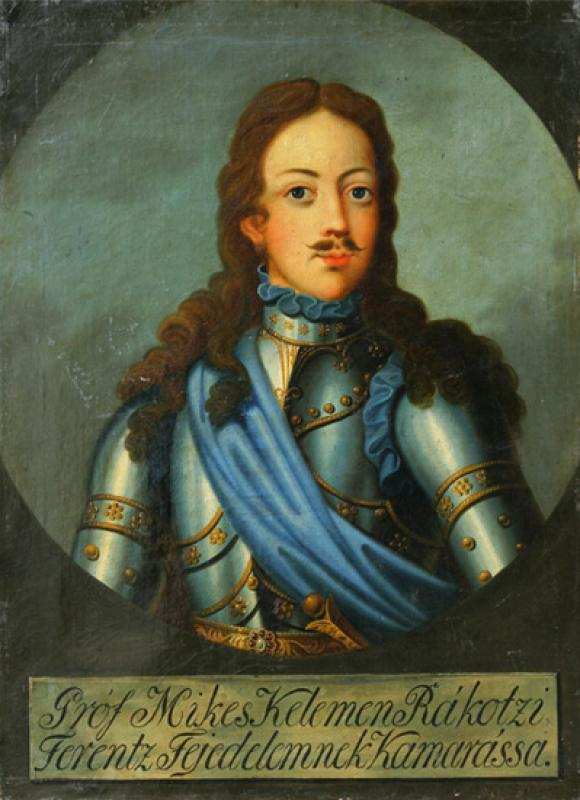
Kelemen Mikes

Kelemen Mikes (1690–1761) was a Transylvanian-born Hungarian political figure and essayist, noted for his rebellious activities against the Habsburg monarchy. Mikes is referred to as the "Hungarian Goethe", made famous by his Letters from Turkey. With these, Mikes laid the foundations of Hungarian literary prose, and he is regarded as one of the first Hungarian prose authors.

He was born in Zágon and grew up in Zabola (present-day Covasna County, Romania). He fought the Habsburg until being forced to flee to the Polish–Lithuanian Commonwealth, France and eventually the Ottoman Empire. While in Tekirdağ, where he lived in exile with the Transylvanian Prince Ferenc Rákóczi, Mikes completed and published his essays. After Rákóczi's death in 1735, he stayed in exile until his own death.
