= Edward Wortley Montagu (diplomat) =

British ambassador

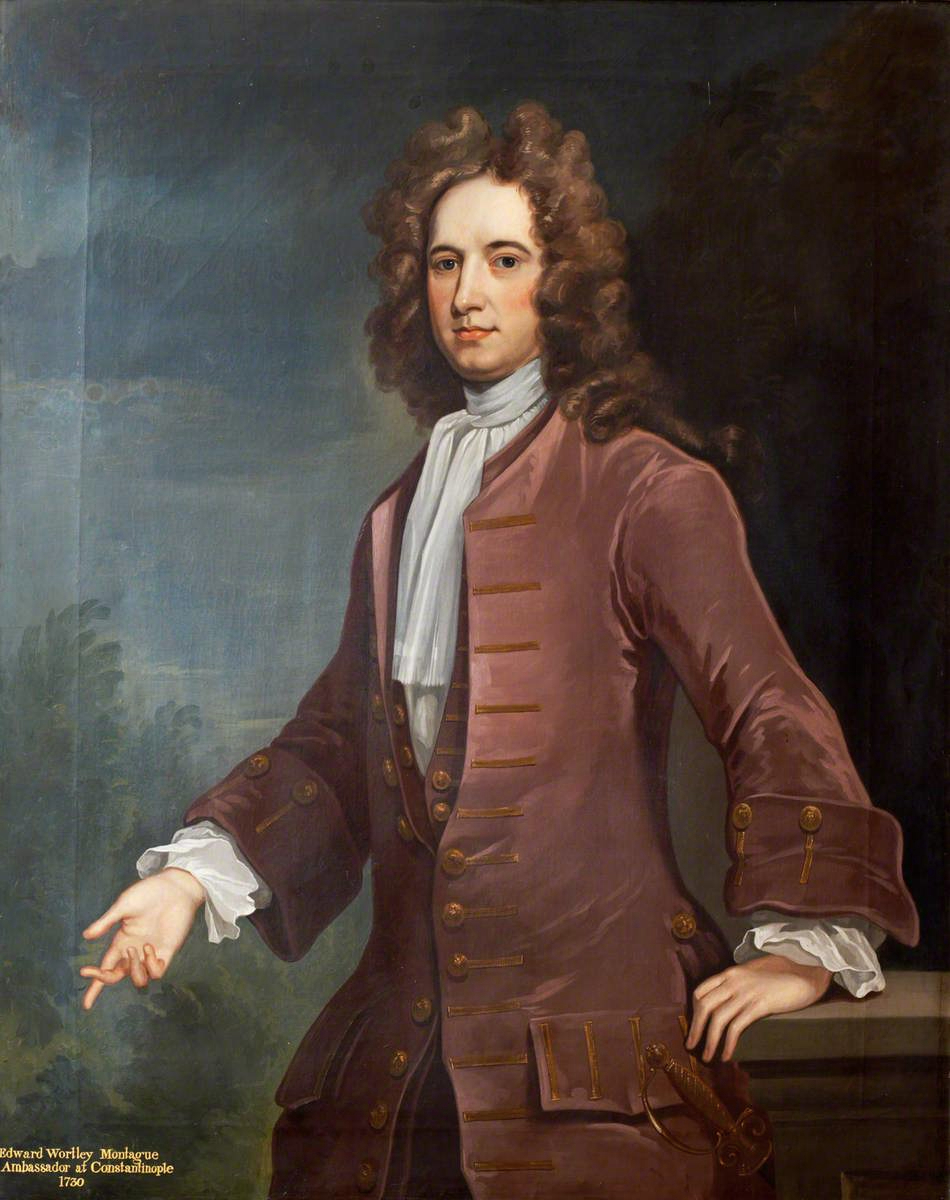
- Portrait of Edward Wortley Montagu from 1730
- Born: 8 February 1678
- Died: 22 January 1761 (aged 82)
- Education: Trinity College, Cambridge
- Occupations: Politician, diplomat
- Spouse: Lady Mary Wortley Montagu
- Children: Mary Stuart, Countess of Bute, Edward Wortley Montagu
- Father: Sidney Wortley Montagu

Edward Wortley Montagu (8 February 1678 – 22 January 1761) was an English coal-owner and politician. He was British Ambassador to the Ottoman Empire, husband of the writer Lady Mary Wortley Montagu and father of the writer and traveller Edward Wortley Montagu.

== Life ==
Son of Sidney Wortley Montagu and grandson of Edward Montagu, 1st Earl of Sandwich, Wortley Montagu was educated at Westminster School and was admitted at Trinity College, Cambridge in 1693. He entered the Middle Temple, also in 1693, and the Inner Temple in 1706. He was called to the bar in 1699.

In 1700–1701 Montagu went on a Grand Tour, some of the time accompanied by Joseph Addison. He visited France and Switzerland.

Montagu was a prominent Whig politician, and first elected as Member of Parliament for Huntingdon in 1705. In a close election in the two-member seat, with much bribery by the victors, he was returned with Sir John Cotton, ahead of John Pedley. He became a Lord Commissioner of the Treasury, serving from 1714 to 1715. In 1715 Montagu stood for Westminster. The election in the two-member constituency was uncontested, and he was returned with the Tory Sir Thomas Crosse.

Made Ambassador to the Ottoman Empire and elected the representative of the Levant Company on the nomination of King George I on 10 May 1716, Montagu arrived with his wife at Adrianople (now known as Edirne) on 13 March 1717. He was charged with pursuing the ongoing negotiations between the Ottomans and the Habsburg Empire. Unsuccessful in his position, he was not accredited Ambassador to the Ottoman Porte in Constantinople before he was recalled in October 1717. His daughter Mary was born at Constantinople in January 1718. He left Thrace on 15 July 1718 and travelled for some time in the Near East.

Upon his return to England, Montagu fell out with the Whig hierarchy. He remained a Member of Parliament, for Huntingdon once more from 1722 to 1734.

In 1726 Montagu was a signatory, with his father, to the document creating the Grand Allies coal cartel in North East England. Coal-related business had been a preoccupation for him since about 1709: he was included in meetings from about that time of an earlier coal cartel to which his father belonged. He succeeded his father in 1727, inheriting Wortley Hall, near Barnsley in South Yorkshire. He represented Peterborough in parliament from 1734 until his death in 1761.

== Wortley Hall ==
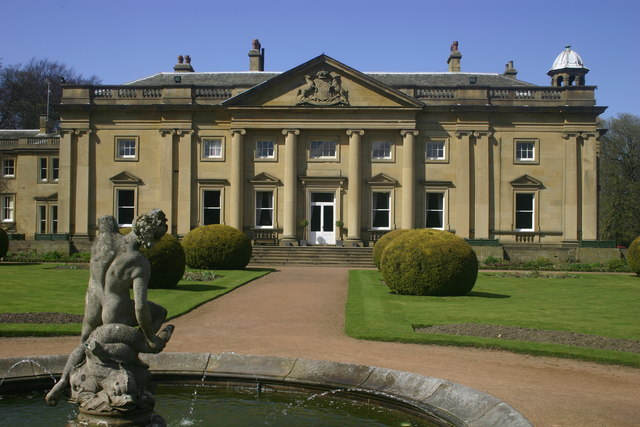
Wortley Hall, view from the south, 2009 photograph showing in the pediment the arms of Baron Wharncliffe added after 1826

Montagu remodelled Wortley Hall, where in 1743 a design by Giacomo Leoni for the south front was carried out. From 1757 to 1761 the East Wing was added. The work was carried out by John Platt. Howard Colvin states that the design was probably by Matthew Brettingham. Work by Platt continued after Montagu's death, with the West Wing added for his daughter Mary in the 1780s.

== Family ==
Montagu is known for his correspondence and elopement with Mary Pierrepont, daughter of Evelyn Pierrepont, 1st Marquess of Dorchester, later created first Duke of Kingston-upon-Hull. They were married in 1712. On his death, he left his estates and a large fortune to his daughter Mary Bute, having in 1755 cut off his son Edward with only a small allowance. In 1736, Mary had married the future Prime Minister, John Stuart, 3rd Earl of Bute.

== Notes ==
Parliament of England
Preceded by The Earl of Orrery; Anthony Hammond	Member of Parliament for Huntingdon; 1705–1707; With: Sir John Cotton 1705–1706; John Pedley 1706–1707	Succeeded by Parliament of Great Britain
Parliament of Great Britain
Preceded by Parliament of England	Member of Parliament for Huntingdon; 1707–1713; With: John Pedley 1707–1708; Francis Page 1708–1713	Succeeded by Viscount Hinchingbrooke; Sidney Wortley Montagu
Preceded by Thomas Medlycott; Sir Thomas Crosse	Member of Parliament for Westminster; 1715–1722; With: Sir Thomas Crosse	Succeeded by Archibald Hutcheson; John Cotton
Preceded by Viscount Hinchingbrooke; Sidney Wortley Montagu	Member of Parliament for Huntingdon; 1722–1734; With: Roger Handasyde	Succeeded by Roger Handasyde; Edward Montagu
Preceded by Joseph Banks; Armstead Parker	Member of Parliament for Peterborough; 1734–1761; With: Armstead Parker 1734–1741, 1742–1747; The Earl FitzWilliam 1741–1742; Sir Matthew Lamb 1747–1761	Succeeded by Sir Matthew Lamb; Armstead Parker
Diplomatic posts
Preceded by Sir Robert Sutton	British Ambassador to the Ottoman Empire; 1716–1718	Succeeded by Abraham Stanyan
