= George Gounter =

English politician

George Gounter or Gunter (c. 1646 – 1718) of Racton, Sussex, was an English politician who sat in the House of Commons in 1685.

Gounter was returned as Member of Parliament for Chichester in 1685.

Gounter's son Charles Gounter Nicoll was also a Member of Parliament.
