= John Pedley =

English politician (died 1838)

John Pedley (c. 1762 – 22 July 1838) was an English politician. He sat as MP for Hindon from 1802 till 1806 and Saltash from 26 February 1808 till April 1809.

He was the third son of Simon Pedley.
