= Charles Gounter Nicoll =

British politician

Gounter's Name Act 1726
- Act of Parliament
- Parliament of Great Britain
- Long title: An Act to enable Charles Nicoll, alias Gounter, Esquire, and his Issue Male, to take and use the Surname of Nicoll, pursuant to the Deed of Settlement of William Nicoll Esquire, deceased.
- Citation: 13 Geo. 1. c. 5 Pr.
- Territorial extent: Great Britain

Dates
- Royal assent: 24 March 1727
- Commencement: 17 January 1727 (Note: Start of session.)

Status: Current legislation

Sir Charles Gounter Nicoll KB (1704 – 24 November 1733), of Racton, Sussex, was a British politician who sat in the House of Commons from 1729 to 1733.

Gounter Nicoll, born Gounter was baptised on 7 October 1704, the eldest son of George Gounter, MP of Racton, and his wife Judith Nicoll, daughter of Richard Nicoll of Norbiton Place, Surrey. His grandfather, Colonel George Gounter, helped Charles II to escape from England after the battle of Worcester. Gounter succeeded his father to Racton in 1718. He matriculated at New College, Oxford on 4 April 1722, aged 17. In 1726, he changed his name by a private act of Parliament, Gounter's Name Act 1726 (13 Geo. 1. c. 5 Pr.), adopting the surname of Nicoll, according to the deed of settlement of William Nicoll. He married Elizabeth Blundell, daughter of William Blundell of Basingstoke, Hampshire, whose mother Alice Blunden was the alleged victim of a notorious premature burial.

Gounter Nicoll was returned as Member of Parliament for Peterborough at a by-election on 29 January 1729. He voted with the government and was knighted as Knight of the Order of the Bath on 30 June 1732.

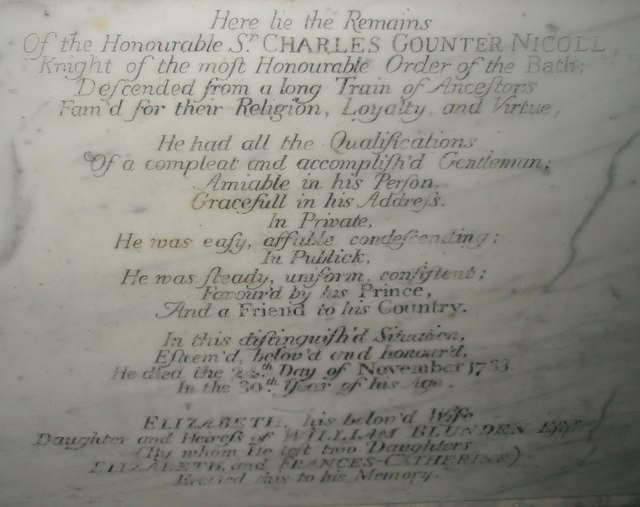
Sir Charles Gounter Nicoll's tombstone

Gounter Nicoll died on 24 November 1733, having had two daughters Elizabeth, and Frances Catherine and was buried in St Peter's Church in Racton. His widow prosecuted a journalist, soon after her husband's death, for defaming him for accepting KB. The cost of the prosecution was met from secret service funds. In 1735 she married Lord Lindsey, 3rd Duke of Ancaster with £70,000. Gounter Nicoll's daughter Frances Catherine married William Legge, 2nd Earl of Dartmouth with £100,000 in 1755.

Gounter Nicoll's last will and testament of 13 April 1731 names his mother as Judith Gounter, his sister Katharine as married to Sir Henry Maynard, nephew William Maynard, his Aunt Nicoll, and his Uncle William Wither and Wither's wife.

== Notes ==
Parliament of Great Britain
Preceded by John FitzWilliam, Viscount Milton; Joseph Banks	Member of Parliament for Peterborough; 1729–1733; With: Joseph Banks	Succeeded by Armstead Parker; Joseph Banks
