= Peterborough City Council elections =

Local government elections in Cambridgeshire, England

Peterborough City Council elections are generally held three years out of every four, with roughly a third of the council elected each time for a four-year term of office. Peterborough City Council is the local authority for Peterborough in the ceremonial county of Cambridgeshire, England. Since 1998 the council has been a unitary authority, providing both district and county-level services. Prior to 1998 it was a lower-tier council with county-level services provided by Cambridgeshire County Council.

== Political control ==
Political control of the unitary authority has been held by the following groups:

The City of Peterborough (1) shown within Cambridgeshire.

Election	Party	Seats	+/-
1997	Labour	25	
1999	No overall control Lab largest single party	(25)	0
2000	No overall control Con largest single party	(27)	+3
2001	No overall control Con largest single party	(26)	−1
2002	Conservative	29	+2
2004	Conservative	33	+9
2006	Conservative	35	+3
2007	Conservative	40	+5
2008	Conservative	43	+3
2010	Conservative	39	−4
2011	Conservative	38	−1
2012	Conservative	32	−6
2014	No overall control Con largest single party	(28)	+2
2015	No overall control Con largest single party	(27)	−1
2016	Conservative	31	+4
2017	No overall control Con largest single party	(30)	−1
2018	Conservative	31	+1
2019	No overall control Con largest single party	(28)	−3
2020	No overall control Con largest single party	(26)	−2
2021	No overall control Con largest single party	(29)	+1
2022	No overall control Con largest single party	(28)	−1
2023	No overall control Con largest single party	(30)	+2
2024	No overall control Lab largest single party	(19)	+5
2026	No overall control Con largest single party	(13)	+2

== Council elections ==
Composition of the council
Year	Conservative	Labour	Liberal Democrats (Note: Includes totals for the predecessors of the Liberal Democrats, the Liberal Party and SDP (both of which participated in the Alliance).)	Green (Note: Includes totals for the predecessors of the Green Party of England and Wales, the Ecology Party and Green Party UK.)	Reform	UKIP	Liberal	Peterborough First (Note: Includes totals for Werrington First, the predecessor of Peterborough First.)	Independents & Others	Council control after election
Local government reorganisation; council established (48 seats)
1973	19	28	1	–	–	–	–	–	0	Labour
New ward boundaries (48 seats)
1976	25	22	1	0	–	–	–	–	0	Conservative
1978	24	23	1	0	–	–	–	–	0	No overall control
1979	23	24	1	0	–	–	–	–	0	No overall control
1980	22	25	1	0	–	–	–	–	0	Labour
1982	21	22	5	0	–	–	–	–	0	No overall control
1983	18	23	7	0	–	–	–	–	0	No overall control
1984	18	22	8	0	–	–	–	–	0	No overall control
1986	15	22	10	0	–	–	–	–	1	No overall control
1987	17	22	8	0	–	–	–	–	1	No overall control
1988	20	22	6	0	–	–	–	–	0	No overall control
1990	21	23	4	0	–	–	0	–	0	No overall control
1991	19	23	6	0	–	–	0	–	0	No overall control
1992	22	19	7	0	–	–	0	–	0	No overall control
1994	21	19	1	0	–	0	7	–	0	No overall control
1995	19	22	1	0	–	0	6	–	0	No overall control
1996	13	29	2	0	–	0	4	–	0	Labour
Peterborough becomes a unitary authority; new ward boundaries (57 seats)
1997	24	27	2	0	–	0	3	–	1	No overall control
1999	24	25	3	0	–	0	3	–	1	No overall control
2000	27	22	2	0	–	0	3	–	2	No overall control
2001	26	23	3	0	–	0	3	–	2	No overall control
2002	29	19	3	0	–	0	3	–	3	Conservative
New ward boundaries (57 seats)
2004	33	7	4	0	–	0	4	–	9	Conservative
2006	34	4	5	0	–	0	3	–	11	Conservative
2007	40	2	4	0	–	0	3	–	8	Conservative
2008	43	2	3	0	–	0	3	–	6	Conservative
2010	39	3	3	0	–	0	3	–	7	Conservative
2011	38	6	3	0	–	0	3	1	6	Conservative
2012	32	11	4	0	–	0	3	2	5	Conservative
2014	28	12	4	0	–	3	3	2	5	No overall control
2015	27	12	4	0	–	4	3	2	5	No overall control
New ward boundaries (60 seats)
2016	31	14	7	0	–	2	3	3	0	Conservative
2018	31	14	6	1	–	1	2	3	2	Conservative
2019	28	17	9	2	–	0	1	3	0	No overall control
2021	29	15	8	3	0	0	0	3	2	No overall control
2022	28	17	8	3	0	0	0	3	1	No overall control
2023	30	14	8	3	0	0	0	4	1	No overall control
2024	11	19	9	4	0	0	0	14	3	No overall control
2026	13	11	8	6	4	0	0	8	9	No overall control

== City result maps ==
2004 results map

2006 results map

2007 results map

2008 results map

2010 results map

2011 results map

2012 results map

2014 results map

2015 results map

2016 results map

2018 results map

2019 results map

2021 results map

2022 results map

2023 results map

2024 results map

2026 results map

== By-election results ==
=== 1997–2002 ===
North Bretton By-Election: 22 March 2001
Party	Candidate	Votes	%	±%
Labour	Angus Ellis	805	53.7	−7.4
Conservative	Sheila Scott	591	39.5	+0.6
Liberal Democrats	Rohan Wilson	102	6.8	+6.8
Majority		214	14.2	
Turnout		1,498	26.8	
Labour hold		Swing		

=== 2002–2006 ===
Walton By-Election: 13 February 2003
Party	Candidate	Votes	%	±%
Liberal Democrats	Christopher Spencer	640	52.8	+1.1
Conservative	Brian Hutchinson	355	29.3	+4.5
Labour	Mary Rainey	218	18.0	−5.5
Majority		285	23.5	
Turnout		1,213	30.5	
Liberal Democrats hold		Swing		

West Ward By-Election: 18 September 2003
Party	Candidate	Votes	%	±%
Conservative	Matthew Dalton	1,405	69.5	+1.6
Liberal Democrats	Jessica Story	393	19.4	+8.1
Labour	Michael Langford	224	11.1	−5.2
Majority		1,012	50.1	
Turnout		2,022	33.2	
Conservative hold		Swing		

=== 2006–2010 ===
Northborough By-Election: 13 July 2006
Party	Candidate	Votes	%	±%
Conservative	Peter Hiller	393	44.6	−16.5
Independent	Simon Potter	388	44.0	+18.3
Liberal Democrats	Peter Stead-Davis	64	7.3	+7.3
Labour	Mark Duckworth	36	4.0	−9.2
Majority		5	0.6	
Turnout		881	41.0	
Conservative hold		Swing		

West Ward By-Election: 10 December 2009
Party	Candidate	Votes	%	±%
Conservative	Nick Arculus	1,252	58.4	+4.1
Labour	John Knowles	341	15.9	+0.9
Liberal Democrats	Ginny McDermid	224	10.4	+7.4
UKIP	Frances Fox	177	8.3	+8.3
English Democrat	Jane Cage	93	4.3	−20.1
Green	Fiona Radic	58	2.7	−0.5
Majority		911	42.5	
Turnout		2,145	34.0	
Conservative hold		Swing		

=== 2014–2018 ===
West By-Election 29 October 2015
Party	Candidate	Votes	%	±%
Conservative	Lynne Ayres	1,174	46.4	+1.1
Labour	Mohammed Sabir	742	29.4	−2.3
UKIP	John Myles	415	16.4	+1.6
Liberal Democrats	Malcolm Pollack	103	4.1	+4.1
Green	Alex Airey	94	3.7	−4.5
Majority		432	17.1	
Turnout		2,528		
Conservative hold		Swing		

East By-Election 8 June 2017
Party	Candidate	Votes	%	±%
Labour	Matthew Mahabadi	1900	51.3	+17.3
Conservative	Jay Beecher	1111	30.0	−10.0
UKIP	Graham Whitehead	358	9.7	−8.9
Liberal Democrats	Jelana Stevic	332	9.0	+9.0
Majority		781	21.3	N/A
Turnout		3701	52.8	+17.8
Labour gain from Conservative		Swing	13.7	

Park By-Election 17 August 2017
Party	Candidate	Votes	%	±%
Labour	Shahzad Nawaz	1713	49.6	+9.8
Conservative	Arfan Khan	1111	39.8	+2.2
UKIP	Graham Whitehead	176	5.1	−4.0
Liberal Democrats	Ian Hardman	109	3.2	−1.1
Green	Carolyn English	83	2.4	−6.9
Majority		602	9.8	N/A
Turnout		3456	49.9	−4.4
Labour hold		Swing	N/A	

Eye, Thorney and Newborough By-Election 7 September 2017
Party	Candidate	Votes	%	±%
Conservative	Nigel Simons	1018	52.3	+17.4
Labour	Christian DeFeo	555	28.5	+15.2
UKIP	Mary Herdman	279	14.3	−7.5
Green	Michael Alexander	61	3.4	−6.4
Liberal Democrats	Callum Robertson	35	1.8	+1.8
Majority		463	23.8	N/A
Turnout		1949	27.3	−11.8
Conservative hold		Swing	N/A	

=== 2018–2022 ===
Orton Longueville By-Election 2 August 2018
Party	Candidate	Votes	%	±%
Conservative	Gavin Elsey	713	36.5	−1.4
Labour	Heather Skibsted	657	33.7	+1.1
Liberal Democrats	Daniel Gibbs	237	12.1	+4.6
Green	Alexander Airey	201	10.3	−2.7
UKIP	Graham Whitehead	143	7.3	−7.0
Majority		56	2.8	N/A
Turnout		1951	25.9	−13.0
Conservative hold		Swing	N/A	

=== 2022–2026 ===
Barnack By-Election 1 May 2025
Party	Candidate	Votes	%	±%
Independent	Kevin Tighe	524	41.8	+5.6
Reform	Yvonne Scarrott	289	23.0	+23.0
Conservative	Andy Coles	277	22.1	−17.8
Labour	Barbara Reid	106	8.5	−3.6
Green	Dave Pardoe	58	4.6	−0.9
Majority		235	18.7	
Turnout		1,254		
Independent gain from Conservative		Swing		

Fletton and Woodston By-Election 12 February 2026
Party	Candidate	Votes	%	±%
Reform	Andrew O'Neil	565	29.4	+29.4
Green	Ed Murphy	529	27.6	+16.3
Conservative	Andrew Willey	419	21.8	−11.8
Labour	Harvey Woodhouse	323	16.8	−31.3
Liberal Democrats	Neil Walton	84	4.4	−0.7
Majority		36	1.9	
Turnout		1,920		
Reform gain from Labour		Swing		

=== 2026–2030 ===
Fletton and Woodston By-Election 16 July 2026
Party	Candidate	Votes	%	±%
Green	Katherine Sharp	664	41.2	+3.4
Reform	Ryan Gallagher	479	29.7	+2.9
Labour	Adam Marshall	213	13.2	+3.7
Conservative	Janet Brown	208	12.9	−3.2
Liberal Democrats	Lewis Page	37	2.3	+2.3
Your Party	Jonathan Wilde	11	0.7	+0.7
Majority		185	11.5	
Turnout		1,612		
Green gain from Labour		Swing		
