= 1999 Peterborough City Council election =

Local election in Peterborough, England

← 1997	6 May 1999	2000 →

19 out of 57 seats to Peterborough City Council 29 seats needed for a majority

	First party	Second party	Third party
Party	Labour	Conservative	Liberal
Last election	27 seats, 46.8%	24 seats, 42.5%	3 seats, 6.2%
Seats won	8	10	1
Seats after	27	24	3
Seat change	Steady	Steady	Steady
Popular vote	11,325	14,428	1,171
Percentage	41.3%	52.6%	4.3%
Swing	▼4.5%	▲10.1%	▼1.9%
	Fourth party	Fifth party
Party	Liberal Democrats	Independent Labour
Last election	2 seats, 4.4%	1 seat, 1.0%
Seats won	0	0
Seats after	2	1
Seat change	Steady	Steady
Popular vote	265	0
Percentage	1.0%	0.0%
Swing	▼3.4%	▼1.0%
Council control before election
No overall control
Council control after election
No overall control

The 1999 Peterborough City Council election took place on 6 May 1999 to elect members of Peterborough City Council in England. This was on the same day as other local elections.

== Summary ==
=== Election result ===
1999 Peterborough City Council election
Party	This election			Full council			This election		
Party	Seats	Net	Seats %	Other	Total	Total %	Votes	Votes %	+/−
Labour	8	Steady	42.1	19	27	47.4	11,325	41.3	-4.5
Conservative	10	Steady	52.6	14	24	42.1	14,428	52.6	+10.1
Liberal	1	Steady	5.3	2	3	5.3	1,171	4.3	-1.9
Liberal Democrats	0	Steady	0.0	2	2	3.5	265	1.0	-3.4
Independent Labour	0	Steady	0.0	1	1	1.8	N/A	N/A	-1.0
Independent	0	Steady	0.0	0	0	0.0	265	1.0	N/A

== Ward results ==
=== Central ===
Central
Party	Candidate	Votes	%	±%
Labour	N. Khan*	1,330	56.0	–6.2
Conservative	M. Hussain	1,047	44.0	+6.2
Majority		283	11.9	N/A
Turnout		2,377	47.2	–34.8
Registered electors		5,203		
Labour hold		Swing	▼6.2	

=== Dogsthorpe ===
Dogsthorpe
Party	Candidate	Votes	%	±%
Liberal	R. Pobgee*	1,005	66.5	+3.3
Labour	C. Hubback	315	20.8	–5.2
Conservative	P. Gale	191	12.6	+1.8
Majority		690	45.7	N/A
Turnout		1,511	29.9	–42.0
Registered electors		5,288		
Liberal hold		Swing	▲4.3	

=== East ===
East
Party	Candidate	Votes	%	±%
Labour	M. Todd*	863	55.3	–5.6
Conservative	M. Collins	697	44.7	+5.6
Majority		166	10.6	N/A
Turnout		1,560	29.7	–23.6
Registered electors		5,625		
Labour hold		Swing	▼5.6	

=== Eye & Thorney ===
Eye & Thorney
Party	Candidate	Votes	%	±%
Conservative	A. Sanders*	1,300	73.9	+18.6
Labour	Z. Bishery	396	22.5	–13.4
Independent	A. Semper	64	3.6	N/A
Majority		904	51.4	N/A
Turnout		1,760	44.9	–29.3
Registered electors		4,051		
Conservative hold		Swing	▲16.0	

=== Fletton ===
Fletton
Party	Candidate	Votes	%	±%
Labour	T. Withers	741	58.4	–6.1
Conservative	G. Casey	389	30.7	–4.8
Liberal Democrats	D. Gater	138	10.9	N/A
Majority		352	27.8	N/A
Turnout		1,268	24.5	–40.9
Registered electors		5,480		
Labour hold		Swing	▼0.7	

=== Glinton ===
Glinton
Party	Candidate	Votes	%	±%
Conservative	J. Holdich*	775	82.1	+7.0
Labour	C. Fisher	169	17.9	–7.0
Majority		606	64.2	+14.0
Turnout		944	39.7	–36.0
Registered electors		2,404		
Conservative hold		Swing	▲7.0	

=== Newborough ===
Newborough
Party	Candidate	Votes	%	±%
Conservative	N. Sanders*	578	81.0	+12.6
Labour	J. Reece	136	19.0	–12.6
Majority		442	61.9	+25.1
Turnout		714	42.6	–51.0
Registered electors		1,701		
Conservative hold		Swing	▲12.6	

=== North Bretton ===
North Bretton
Party	Candidate	Votes	%	±%
Labour	H. Lakhanpaul*	934	62.3	–3.4
Conservative	E. Law	564	37.7	+3.4
Majority		370	24.7	N/A
Turnout		1,498	27.0	–46.7
Registered electors		5,691		
Labour hold		Swing	▼3.4	

=== Northborough ===
Northborough
Party	Candidate	Votes	%	±%
Conservative	B. Franklin*	536	71.9	–0.4
Labour	G. Jackson	209	28.1	+0.4
Majority		327	43.9	–0.6
Turnout		745	39.4	–28.2
Registered electors		1,932		
Conservative hold		Swing	▼0.4	

=== Orton Longueville ===
Orton Longueville
Party	Candidate	Votes	%	±%
Labour	M. Geoffrey*	921	55.8	+14.4
Conservative	L. Hopkins	729	44.2	+13.7
Majority		192	11.6	N/A
Turnout		1,650	28.3	–33.7
Registered electors		6,005		
Labour hold		Swing	▲0.4	

=== Orton Waterville ===
Orton Waterville
Party	Candidate	Votes	%	±%
Conservative	M. D'Andrea*	1,202	64.9	+7.4
Labour	K. Whitworth	651	35.1	–7.4
Majority		551	29.7	N/A
Turnout		1,853	30.8	–28.1
Registered electors		6,162		
Conservative hold		Swing	▲7.4	

=== Park ===
Park
Party	Candidate	Votes	%	±%
Conservative	P. Kreling*	1,248	64.9	+20.1
Labour	A. Pears	604	32.6	–3.2
Majority		644	34.8	N/A
Turnout		1,852	32.9	–33.4
Registered electors		5,847		
Conservative hold		Swing	▲11.7	

=== Paston ===
Paston
Party	Candidate	Votes	%	±%
Labour	P. Ward*	499	50.0	–1.5
Conservative	C. Green	372	37.3	+10.3
Liberal Democrats	R. Wilson	127	12.7	–8.8
Majority		127	12.7	N/A
Turnout		998	20.3	–63.5
Registered electors		5,139		
Labour hold		Swing	▼5.9	

=== Ravensthorpe ===
Ravensthorpe
Party	Candidate	Votes	%	±%
Labour	M. Rainey*	797	61.3	+10.1
Conservative	B. Searle	269	20.7	+2.6
Liberal	D. Robson	166	12.8	–17.9
Independent	H. Newton	69	5.3	N/A
Majority		528	40.6	N/A
Turnout		1,301	25.9	–53.1
Registered electors		5,173		
Labour hold		Swing	▲3.8	

=== Stanground ===
Stanground
Party	Candidate	Votes	%	±%
Conservative	P. Rudd	891	51.9	+7.8
Labour	P. Bonner*	825	48.1	+4.6
Majority		66	3.8	N/A
Turnout		1,716	35.2	–20.8
Registered electors		5,187		
Conservative gain from Labour		Swing	▲1.6	

=== Werrington North ===
Werrington North
Party	Candidate	Votes	%	±%
Labour	C. Caborn	686	49.2	+6.5
Conservative	T. Hitchborn	576	41.3	+4.0
Independent	J. Linskey	132	9.5	N/A
Majority		110	7.9	N/A
Turnout		1,394	26.9	–44.9
Registered electors		5,344		
Labour gain from Conservative		Swing	▲1.3	

=== Werrington South ===
Werrington South
Party	Candidate	Votes	%	±%
Conservative	J. Hunter*	942	64.0	+21.3
Labour	S. Higgins	530	36.0	+1.9
Majority		412	28.0	N/A
Turnout		1,472	27.5	–55.3
Registered electors		5,479		
Conservative hold		Swing	▲9.7	

=== West ===
West
Party	Candidate	Votes	%	±%
Conservative	D. Thorpe*	1,720	74.2	+10.5
Labour	D. Matthews	598	25.8	–10.5
Majority		1,122	48.4	N/A
Turnout		2,318	42.2	–0.7
Registered electors		5,658		
Conservative hold		Swing	▲10.5	

=== Wittering ===
Wittering
Party	Candidate	Votes	%	±%
Conservative	J. Horrell*	402	76.9	+6.0
Labour	M. Beaver	121	23.1	–6.0
Majority		281	53.7	+11.9
Turnout		523	29.4	–51.6
Registered electors		1,839		
Conservative hold		Swing	▲6.0	
