= 2015 Peterborough City Council election =

Local election in Peterborough, England

← 2014	7 May 2015	2016 →

20 out of 57 seats 29 seats needed for a majority

	First party	Second party	Third party
Party	Conservative	Labour	Independent
Last election	31 seats, 33.2%	11 seats, 29.0%	6 seats, 7.5%
Seats won	11	5	2
Seats after	29	12	6
Seat change	▼2	▲1	Steady
Popular vote	27,229	21,413	3,948
Percentage	38.0%	29.9%	5.5%
Swing	▲4.8%	▲0.9%	▼2.0%
	Fourth party	Fifth party	Sixth party
Party	UKIP	Liberal Democrats	Liberal
Last election	3 seats, 16.2%	3 seats, 5.8%	3 seats, 3.0%
Seats won	1	0	1
Seats after	4	3	3
Seat change	▲1	Steady	Steady
Popular vote	10,471	2,140	1,446
Percentage	14.6%	3.0%	2.0%
Swing	▼1.6%	▼2.8%	▼1.0%
- Results of the 2015 Peterborough City Council election
Council control before election
Conservative Party
Council control after election
Conservative Party

The 2015 Peterborough City Council election took place on 7 May 2015 to elect members of Peterborough City Council in England. This was on the same day as other local elections.

== Election result ==
2015 Peterborough City Council election
Party	This election			Full council			This election		
Party	Seats	Net	Seats %	Other	Total	Total %	Votes	Votes %	+/−
Conservative	11	▼2	55.0	18	29	50.9	27,229	38.0	+4.8
Labour	5	▲1	25.0	7	12	21.1	21,413	29.9	+0.9
Independent	2	Steady	10.0	4	6	10.5	3,948	5.5	-2.0
UKIP	1	▲1	5.0	3	4	7.0	10,471	14.6	-1.6
Liberal Democrats	0	Steady	0.0	3	3	5.3	2,140	3.0	-2.8
Liberal	1	Steady	5.0	2	3	5.3	1,446	2.0	-1.0
Green	0	Steady	0.0	0	0	0.0	4,501	6.3	+3.0
English Democrat	0	Steady	0.0	0	0	0.0	324	0.5	-0.8
TUSC	0	Steady	0.0	0	0	0.0	131	0.2	-0.5

== Ward results ==
=== Bretton North ===
Bretton North
Party	Candidate	Votes	%	±%
Labour	Colin Martin	1,422	37.4	+5.5
Conservative	Scott Warren	1,064	28.0	+4.3
UKIP	Ann Chanter-Allen	945	24.9	−10.7
Green	Wendy Hirst	194	5.1	N/A
Liberal Democrats	Rohan Wilson	177	4.7	−4.2
Majority		358	9.4	
Turnout		3,802		
Labour hold		Swing	▲0.6	

=== Bretton South ===
Bretton South
Party	Candidate	Votes	%	±%
Conservative	Andy Coles	601	43.2	−18.0
Labour	Angus Ellis	413	29.7	+8.6
Independent	Michael Flectcher	240	17.2	N/A
Liberal Democrats	Malcolm Pollack	71	5.1	N/A
Green	Samuel Gibbons	67	4.8	−2.5
Majority		188	13.5	
Turnout		1,392		
Conservative hold		Swing	▼13.3	

=== Central ===
Central
Party	Candidate	Votes	%	±%
Conservative	Mohammed Nadeem	2,294	50.6	+25.7
Labour	Sabra Yasin	1,856	40.9	−24.0
Green	Alexander Airey	383	8.4	−1.8
Majority		438	9.7	
Turnout		4,533		
Conservative hold		Swing	▲24.9	

=== Dogsthorpe ===
Dogsthorpe
Party	Candidate	Votes	%	±%
Liberal	Christabel Saltmarsh	1,303	38.4	−20.4
Labour	Haggai Odep	898	26.5	−3.5
UKIP	Peter O'Dell	649	19.1	N/A
Conservative	Emily Fisher	460	13.6	+2.4
Green	Nicholas Senior	83	2.4	N/A
Majority		405	11.9	
Turnout		3,393		
Liberal hold		Swing	▼8.5	

=== East ===
East
Party	Candidate	Votes	%	±%
Labour	Nabil Shabbir	1,622	41.6	+12.4
Conservative	Adam Collins	1,135	29.1	−6.9
UKIP	Mary Herdman	762	19.5	−2.8
Green	Michael Alexander	236	6.1	+1.3
Liberal	Sandra Ringler	143	3.7	−3.9
Majority		487	12.5	
Turnout		3,898		
Labour hold		Swing	▲9.7	

=== Fletton and Woodston ===
Fletton and Woodston
Party	Candidate	Votes	%	±%
Conservative	Rui Faustino	1,798	39.5	+8.6
Labour	Alan Dowson	1,437	31.6	+2.4
Independent	Dusan Obradovic	673	14.8	N/A
Green	Ian Tennant	511	11.2	+4.3
TUSC	Jonathan Lloyd	131	2.9	+1.3
Majority		361	7.9	
Turnout		4,550		
Conservative hold		Swing	▲3.1	

=== North ===
North
Party	Candidate	Votes	%	±%
Independent	Charles Swift	1,047	50.3	−12.9
Labour	Bonita Yonga	590	28.4	+1.0
Conservative	Harr Gartside	303	14.6	+5.2
Green	Stephanie Wilson	141	6.8	N/A
Majority		457	21.9	
Turnout		2,081		
Independent hold		Swing	▼7.0	

=== Northborough ===
Northborough
Party	Candidate	Votes	%	±%
Conservative	Peter Hiller	1,140	67.6	+7.2
UKIP	Terence Palmer	368	21.8	+14.4
Green	Sarah Wilkinson	179	10.6	N/A
Majority		772	45.8	
Turnout		1,508		
Conservative hold		Swing	▼3.6	

=== Orton Longueville ===
Orton Longueville
Party	Candidate	Votes	%	±%
Conservative	Graham Casey	1,398	36.0	+6.0
UKIP	Rupert Dexter	1,128	29.1	−2.6
Labour	Evelina Sidlauskiene	1,122	28.9	+0.7
Green	Richard Horton	234	6.0	±0.0
Majority		270	6.9	
Turnout		3,882		
Conservative hold		Swing	▲4.3	

=== Orton Waterville ===
Orton Waterville
Party	Candidate	Votes	%	±%
Conservative	Kim Aitken	2,532	54.5	+9.0
UKIP	Iain McLaughlan	924	19.9	−10.4
Labour	David Weaver	874	18.8	+4.3
Green	Colin Honeyman-Smith	319	6.9	−1.1
Majority		1,608	34.6	
Turnout		4,649		
Conservative hold		Swing	▲9.7	

=== Orton with Hampton ===
Orton with Hampton
Party	Candidate	Votes	%	±%
Conservative	Nigel North	2,476	42.3	+4.7
Labour	Susan Johnson	1,328	22.7	−2.8
UKIP	Matthew Bliszczak	1,047	17.9	N/A
Green	Darren Bisby-Boyd	498	8.5	−2.9
Liberal Democrats	Christopher Wiggin	498	8.5	−2.2
Majority		1,148	19.6	
Turnout		5,847		
Conservative hold		Swing	▲3.8	

=== Park ===
Park
Party	Candidate	Votes	%	±%
Labour	John Shearman	2,049	50.3	+4.7
Conservative	Stephen Allen	1,438	35.3	−3.2
UKIP	Graham Whitehead	326	8.0	−1.2
Green	Fiona Radic	172	4.2	+0.3
Liberal Democrats	Rebeka Sellick	90	2.2	−0.2
Majority		611	15.0	
Turnout		4,075		
Labour hold		Swing	▲4.0	

=== Paston ===
Paston
Party	Candidate	Votes	%	±%
Labour	Jonas Hopogap Yonga	1,116	33.6	−1.3
Conservative	Bryan Tyler	1,037	31.3	+7.2
UKIP	Sharon Varkalis	842	25.4	−15.6
Liberal Democrats	Peter Chivall	171	5.2	N/A
Green	Roger Proudfoot	151	4.6	N/A
Majority		79	2.3	
Turnout		3,317		
Labour gain from Conservative		Swing	▼4.3	

=== Ravensthorpe ===
Ravensthorpe
Party	Candidate	Votes	%	±%
Labour	Edward Murphy	1,207	46.4	+10.6
Conservative	Harry Newton	813	31.2	−25.0
UKIP	David Neville	496	19.1	+11.1
Green	Joanna Weedon	87	3.3	N/A
Majority		394	15.2	
Turnout		2,603		
Labour hold		Swing	▲17.8	

=== Stanground Central ===
Stanground Central (2 seats due to by-election)
Party	Candidate	Votes	%	±%
Conservative	Raymond Bisby	1,731	44.9	
UKIP	John Whitby	1,560	40.4	
Conservative	Marco Cereste	1,418	36.8	
Labour	Margaret Thulbourn	1,273	33.0	
Labour	Christopher York	1,031	26.7	
Green	Jonathan Phillipson Brown	376	9.7	
English Democrat	Nicholas Capp	324	8.4	
Turnout		3,857		
Conservative hold				
UKIP gain from Conservative				

=== Stanground East ===
Stanground East
Party	Candidate	Votes	%	±%
Conservative	Christopher Harper	775	59.0	+1.6
Labour	John Thulbourn	403	30.7	+4.2
Green	Ruth Fiddy	136	10.4	N/A
Majority		372	28.3	
Turnout		1,314		
Conservative hold		Swing	▼1.3	

=== Werrington North ===
Werrington North
Party	Candidate	Votes	%	±%
Independent	Judith Fox	1,988	52.7	−8.0
Conservative	Darren Morley	942	25.0	+5.8
Labour	Christopher Jones	632	16.8	+4.0
Green	Chery Beeby	209	5.5	N/A
Majority		1,046	27.7	
Turnout		3,771		
Independent hold		Swing	▼8.9	

=== Werrington South ===
Werrington South
Party	Candidate	Votes	%	±%
Conservative	Paula Thacker	1,562	39.1	+18.8
Liberal Democrats	Andrew Bond	1,133	28.4	−20.2
UKIP	Michael Kennedy	669	16.8	−4.8
Labour	Vincent Moon	521	13.1	+3.6
Green	Joseph Wells	107	2.7	N/A
Majority		429	10.7	
Turnout		3,992		
Conservative hold		Swing	▲19.5	

=== West ===
West
Party	Candidate	Votes	%	±%
Conservative	Wane Fitzgerald	2,312	45.3	+4.3
Labour	Mohammed Sabir	1,619	31.7	+0.2
UKIP	John Myles	755	14.8	−4.6
Green	Karen Lawrence	418	8.2	N/A
Majority		693	13.6	
Turnout		5,104		
Conservative hold		Swing	▲2.1	

== By-elections ==
=== West ===
A by-election was called due to the resignation of Cllr Nick Arculus.

West: 29 October 2015
Party	Candidate	Votes	%	±%
Conservative	Lynne Ayres	1,174	46.4	
Labour	Mohammed Sabir	742	29.4	
UKIP	John Myles	415	16.4	
Liberal Democrats	Malcolm Pollack	103	4.1	
Green	Alex Airey	94	3.7	
Majority		432	17.0	
Turnout		2,528		
Conservative hold		Swing		
