= 1997 Peterborough City Council election =

Local election in Peterborough, England

| ← 1996 | 7 May 1997 | 1999 → |

All 57 seats to Peterborough City Council 29 seats needed for a majority
- Turnout: 67.0%

| | First party | Second party | Third party |
|---|---|---|---|
| Party | Labour | Conservative | Liberal |
| Last election | 29 seats, 49.4% | 13 seats, 33.4% | 3 seats, 5.5% |
| Seats won | 27 | 24 | 3 |
| Seat change | ▼2 | ▲11 | Steady |
| Popular vote | 76,738 | 71,278 | 10,320 |
| Percentage | 45.8% | 42.5% | 6.2% |
| Swing | ▼3.6% | ▲9.1% | ▲0.7% |
| | Fourth party | Fifth party |
| Party | Liberal Democrats | Independent Labour |
| Last election | 2 seats, 8.6% | 0 seats, 0.0% |
| Seats won | 2 | 1 |
| Seat change | Steady | ▲1 |
| Popular vote | 7,344 | 1,734 |
| Percentage | 4.4% | 1.0% |
| Swing | ▼4.2% | N/A |
Council control before election
Labour
Council control after election
No overall control

The 1997 Peterborough City Council election took place on 7 May 1997 to elect members of Peterborough City Council in England. This was on the same day as the 1997 general election and other local elections.

The whole council was up for election on new ward boundaries and the number of seats increased by 8. Labour lost their majority on the council, which they had narrowly gained at the 1996 election. Despite this, Labour remained the largest party.

== Results summary ==
=== Election results ===
1997 Peterborough City Council election
| Party | This election | | | Full council | | | This election | | |
| Party | Seats | Net | Seats % | Other | Total | Total % | Votes | Votes % | +/− |
|---|---|---|---|---|---|---|---|---|---|
| Labour | 27 | ▼2 | 47.4 | 0 | 27 | 47.4 | 76,738 | 45.8 | -3.6 |
| Conservative | 24 | ▲11 | 42.1 | 0 | 24 | 42.1 | 71,278 | 42.5 | +9.1 |
| Liberal | 3 | Steady | 5.3 | 0 | 3 | 5.3 | 10,320 | 6.2 | +0.7 |
| Liberal Democrats | 2 | Steady | 3.5 | 0 | 2 | 3.5 | 7,344 | 4.4 | -4.2 |
| Independent Labour | 1 | ▲1 | 1.8 | 0 | 1 | 1.8 | 1,734 | 1.0 | N/A |
| Ind. Conservative | 0 | Steady | 0.0 | 0 | 0 | 0.0 | 266 | 0.2 | N/A |
| Independent | 0 | ▼2 | 0.0 | 0 | 0 | 0.0 | N/A | N/A | N/A |

== Ward results ==
=== Barnack ===
Barnack
| Party | Candidate | Votes | % | ±% |
|---|---|---|---|---|
| Conservative | D. Over | 1,054 | 69.8 | +11.2 |
| Labour | J. Budding | 457 | 30.2 | +5.9 |
| Majority | | 597 | 39.6 | +6.3 |
| Turnout | | 1,511 | 76.2 | +28.2 |
| Registered electors | | 1,983 | | |
| Conservative hold | | Swing | ▲2.7 | |

=== Central ===
Central (3 seats)
| Party | Candidate | Votes | % |
|---|---|---|---|
| Labour | M. Choudhary | 2,199 | 62.1 |
| Labour | R. Akhtar* | 2,074 | 58.6 |
| Labour | N. Khan* | 1,962 | 55.4 |
| Conservative | M. Hussain* | 1,338 | 37.8 |
| Conservative | M. Hussain | 974 | 27.5 |
| Conservative | B. Searle | 935 | 26.4 |
| Turnout | | 3,539 | 82.0 |
| Registered electors | | 4,316 | |
| Labour hold | | | |
| Labour hold | | | |
| Labour hold | | | |

=== Dogsthorpe ===
Dogsthorpe (3 seats)
| Party | Candidate | Votes | % |
|---|---|---|---|
| Liberal | A. Miners* | 2,463 | 63.2 |
| Liberal | K. Duell | 2,239 | 57.4 |
| Liberal | R. Pobgee | 2,100 | 53.9 |
| Labour | C. Fisher | 1,013 | 26.0 |
| Labour | W. Houghton | 958 | 24.6 |
| Labour | V. Stokes | 828 | 21.2 |
| Conservative | S. Holmes | 422 | 10.8 |
| Conservative | A. Stead | 411 | 10.5 |
| Conservative | M. Wright | 332 | 8.5 |
| Turnout | | 3,898 | 71.9 |
| Registered electors | | 5,421 | |
| Liberal hold | | | |
| Liberal hold | | | |
| Liberal hold | | | |

=== East ===
East (3 seats)
| Party | Candidate | Votes | % |
|---|---|---|---|
| Labour | J. Farrell* | 1,917 | 60.8 |
| Labour | C. Edwards | 1,699 | 53.9 |
| Labour | M. Todd* | 1,497 | 47.5 |
| Conservative | P. Grimwood | 1,233 | 39.1 |
| Conservative | D. Hillson | 1,075 | 34.1 |
| Conservative | M. Tahir | 1,016 | 32.2 |
| Turnout | | 3,151 | 53.3 |
| Registered electors | | 5,912 | |
| Labour hold | | | |
| Labour hold | | | |
| Labour hold | | | |

=== Eye & Thorney ===
Eye & Thorney (2 seats)
| Party | Candidate | Votes | % |
|---|---|---|---|
| Conservative | J. Bartlett | 1,659 | 55.3 |
| Conservative | D. Sanders | 1,337 | 44.6 |
| Labour | B. Allway | 1,076 | 35.9 |
| Labour | Z. Bishrey* | 955 | 31.8 |
| Ind. Conservative | A. Semper | 266 | 8.9 |
| Turnout | | 3,001 | 74.2 |
| Registered electors | | 4,045 | |
| Conservative win (new seat) | | | |
| Conservative win (new seat) | | | |

=== Fletton ===
Fletton (3 seats)
| Party | Candidate | Votes | % |
|---|---|---|---|
| Labour | C. Gray* | 2,142 | 64.6 |
| Labour | M. Farrell | 1,732 | 52.2 |
| Labour | B. Payton | 1,495 | 45.1 |
| Conservative | G. Casey | 1,177 | 35.5 |
| Conservative | A. Vigar | 997 | 30.0 |
| Conservative | B. Picton | 903 | 27.2 |
| Turnout | | 3,318 | 65.4 |
| Registered electors | | 5,073 | |
| Labour hold | | | |
| Labour hold | | | |
| Labour hold | | | |

=== Glinton ===
Glinton
| Party | Candidate | Votes | % | ±% |
|---|---|---|---|---|
| Conservative | J. Holdich* | 1,415 | 75.1 | +11.3 |
| Labour | S. Lawrence | 468 | 24.9 | +6.6 |
| Majority | | 947 | 50.2 | +4.7 |
| Turnout | | 1,883 | 75.7 | +30.2 |
| Registered electors | | 2,487 | | |
| Conservative hold | | Swing | ▲2.4 | |

=== Newborough ===
Newborough
| Party | Candidate | Votes | % | ±% |
|---|---|---|---|---|
| Conservative | N. Sanders* | 905 | 68.4 | N/A |
| Labour | G. McClean | 418 | 31.6 | –5.6 |
| Majority | | 487 | 36.8 | N/A |
| Turnout | | 1,323 | 93.6 | +52.9 |
| Registered electors | | 1,413 | | |
| Conservative gain from Independent | | | | |

=== North ===
North (2 seats)
| Party | Candidate | Votes | % |
|---|---|---|---|
| Independent Labour | C. Swift* | 1,734 | 52.1 |
| Labour | W. Burke* | 794 | 23.9 |
| Labour | P. Baylis* | 706 | 21.2 |
| Conservative | P. Gale | 544 | 16.3 |
| Conservative | A. Paul | 294 | 8.8 |
| Liberal Democrats | L. Martin | 256 | 7.7 |
| Turnout | | 3,329 | 70.9 |
| Registered electors | | 4,695 | |
| Independent Labour hold | | | |
| Labour hold | | | |

=== North Bretton ===
North Bretton (3 seats)
| Party | Candidate | Votes | % |
|---|---|---|---|
| Labour | D. Weston | 2,392 | 64.0 |
| Labour | J. Johnson | 2,383 | 63.7 |
| Labour | H. Lakhanpaul | 1,969 | 52.7 |
| Conservative | M. Bye | 1,347 | 36.0 |
| Conservative | B. Dunham | 1,248 | 33.4 |
| Conservative | C. McKeown | 1,134 | 30.3 |
| Turnout | | 3,739 | 73.7 |
| Registered electors | | 5,073 | |
| Labour win (new seat) | | | |
| Labour win (new seat) | | | |
| Labour win (new seat) | | | |

=== Northborough ===
Northborough
| Party | Candidate | Votes | % | ±% |
|---|---|---|---|---|
| Conservative | B. Franklin* | 1,011 | 72.3 | +15.4 |
| Labour | S. Larder | 388 | 27.7 | –1.2 |
| Majority | | 623 | 44.5 | +16.6 |
| Turnout | | 1,399 | 67.6 | +24.7 |
| Registered electors | | 2,070 | | |
| Conservative hold | | Swing | ▲8.3 | |

=== Orton Longueville ===
Orton Longueville (3 seats)
| Party | Candidate | Votes | % |
|---|---|---|---|
| Labour | J. Owens* | 1,881 | 41.9 |
| Labour | C. Weaver* | 1,797 | 40.1 |
| Labour | M. Goffrey* | 1,674 | 37.3 |
| Conservative | L. Hopkins | 1,385 | 30.9 |
| Liberal Democrats | A. Ewing | 1,273 | 28.4 |
| Conservative | L. Markwick | 1,257 | 28.0 |
| Conservative | J. Staines | 1,163 | 25.9 |
| Turnout | | 4,486 | 62.0 |
| Registered electors | | 7,325 | |
| Labour hold | | | |
| Labour hold | | | |
| Labour hold | | | |

=== Orton Waterville ===
Orton Waterville (3 seats)
| Party | Candidate | Votes | % |
|---|---|---|---|
| Conservative | M. Cereste* | 2,257 | 57.5 |
| Conservative | A. Kempsell | 2,224 | 56.7 |
| Conservative | M. D'Andrew | 2,010 | 51.2 |
| Labour | K. Speirs | 1,669 | 42.5 |
| Labour | A. Dale | 1,557 | 39.7 |
| Labour | R. Strangward | 1,344 | 34.3 |
| Turnout | | 3,923 | 58.9 |
| Registered electors | | 6,660 | |
| Conservative hold | | | |
| Conservative win (new seat) | | | |
| Conservative win (new seat) | | | |

=== Park ===
Park (3 seats)
| Party | Candidate | Votes | % |
|---|---|---|---|
| Conservative | Y. Lowndes* | 2,086 | 47.3 |
| Conservative | J. Peach | 2,020 | 45.8 |
| Conservative | P. Kreling* | 1,903 | 43.2 |
| Labour | A. Brosnan | 1,577 | 35.8 |
| Labour | C. Hubback | 1,355 | 30.7 |
| Labour | M. Hussain | 1,242 | 28.2 |
| Liberal | S. Goldspink | 743 | 16.9 |
| Turnout | | 4,408 | 66.3 |
| Registered electors | | 6,649 | |
| Conservative hold | | | |
| Conservative gain from Labour | | | |
| Conservative hold | | | |

=== Paston ===
Paston (3 seats)
| Party | Candidate | Votes | % |
|---|---|---|---|
| Labour | S. Bradley* | 1,936 | 51.5 |
| Labour | J. Bleakney | 1,773 | 47.2 |
| Labour | P. Ward* | 1,379 | 36.7 |
| Conservative | P. Lowndes | 1,015 | 27.0 |
| Conservative | M. Kreling | 958 | 25.5 |
| Conservative | M. Thompson | 866 | 23.0 |
| Liberal Democrats | P. Turner | 808 | 21.5 |
| Turnout | | 3,758 | 83.8 |
| Registered electors | | 4,485 | |
| Labour hold | | | |
| Labour hold | | | |
| Labour win (new seat) | | | |

=== Ravensthorpe ===
Ravensthorpe (3 seats)
| Party | Candidate | Votes | % |
|---|---|---|---|
| Labour | A. Cox* | 1,891 | 51.2 |
| Labour | J. Ledgister* | 1,547 | 41.9 |
| Labour | M. Rainey | 1,475 | 39.9 |
| Liberal | C. Ash | 1,133 | 30.7 |
| Liberal | S. McGee | 911 | 24.7 |
| Liberal | D. Robson | 731 | 19.8 |
| Conservative | A. Hopkins | 669 | 18.1 |
| Conservative | R. Markwick | 572 | 15.5 |
| Conservative | J. Smedley | 555 | 15.0 |
| Turnout | | 3,695 | 79.0 |
| Registered electors | | 4,675 | |
| Labour hold | | | |
| Labour hold | | | |
| Labour hold | | | |

=== South ===
South (2 seats)
| Party | Candidate | Votes | % |
|---|---|---|---|
| Conservative | R. Crick | 749 | 50.8 |
| Labour | M. Dale | 723 | 49.1 |
| Conservative | G. Simons | 626 | 42.5 |
| Labour | A. Pears | 607 | 41.2 |
| Turnout | | 1,473 | 66.2 |
| Registered electors | | 2,225 | |
| Conservative win (new seat) | | | |
| Labour win (new seat) | | | |

=== South Bretton ===
South Bretton (2 seats)
| Party | Candidate | Votes | % |
|---|---|---|---|
| Conservative | M. Burton | 1,445 | 50.9 |
| Labour | A. Ellis | 1,393 | 49.1 |
| Conservative | M. Storti | 1,251 | 44.1 |
| Labour | D. Matthews | 1,232 | 43.4 |
| Turnout | | 2,837 | 67.7 |
| Registered electors | | 4,191 | |
| Conservative win (new seat) | | | |
| Labour win (new seat) | | | |

=== Stanground ===
Stanground (3 seats)
| Party | Candidate | Votes | % |
|---|---|---|---|
| Conservative | C. Sneesby | 1,619 | 44.0 |
| Labour | R. Palmer | 1,598 | 43.5 |
| Labour | P. Bonner* | 1,502 | 40.8 |
| Labour | J. Reece* | 1,170 | 31.8 |
| Conservative | J. Brett | 1,008 | 27.4 |
| Conservative | P. Fierro | 915 | 24.9 |
| Liberal Democrats | S. Crowe | 457 | 12.4 |
| Turnout | | 3,677 | 56.0 |
| Registered electors | | 6,566 | |
| Conservative gain from Labour | | | |
| Labour hold | | | |
| Labour hold | | | |

=== Walton ===
Walton (2 seats)
| Party | Candidate | Votes | % |
|---|---|---|---|
| Liberal Democrats | M. Jackson* | 1,482 | 47.2 |
| Liberal Democrats | N. Sandford* | 1,200 | 38.2 |
| Conservative | J. Roberts* | 915 | 29.1 |
| Labour | C. Cabom | 746 | 23.8 |
| Conservative | R. Allen | 640 | 20.4 |
| Labour | D. Tarren | 523 | 16.7 |
| Turnout | | 3,141 | 63.0 |
| Registered electors | | 4,985 | |
| Liberal Democrats hold | | | |
| Liberal Democrats hold | | | |

=== Werrington North ===
Werrington North (3 seats)
| Party | Candidate | Votes | % |
|---|---|---|---|
| Labour | P. Clements* | 1,703 | 42.7 |
| Conservative | K. Jarvie | 1,490 | 37.3 |
| Conservative | J. Goodfellow | 1,350 | 33.8 |
| Conservative | M. Sims | 1,348 | 33.8 |
| Labour | W. Easton | 1,213 | 30.4 |
| Labour | J. Hall | 1,197 | 30.0 |
| Liberal Democrats | C. Dacre | 797 | 20.0 |
| Turnout | | 3,990 | 71.8 |
| Registered electors | | 5,557 | |
| Labour win (new seat) | | | |
| Conservative win (new seat) | | | |
| Conservative win (new seat) | | | |

=== Werrington South ===
Werrington South (3 seats)
| Party | Candidate | Votes | % |
|---|---|---|---|
| Conservative | R. Burke | 1,975 | 42.7 |
| Conservative | D. Raines | 1,864 | 40.3 |
| Conservative | J. Hunter | 1,628 | 35.2 |
| Labour | N. Gregory | 1,578 | 34.1 |
| Labour | D. McGeachie | 1,442 | 31.2 |
| Liberal Democrats | K. Scott | 1,071 | 23.2 |
| Turnout | | 4,624 | 82.8 |
| Registered electors | | 5,584 | |
| Conservative win (new seat) | | | |
| Conservative win (new seat) | | | |
| Conservative win (new seat) | | | |

=== West ===
West (3 seats)
| Party | Candidate | Votes | % |
|---|---|---|---|
| Conservative | R. Perkins | 2,725 | 63.7 |
| Conservative | G. Ridgway* | 2,693 | 62.9 |
| Conservative | D. Thorpe | 2,486 | 58.1 |
| Labour | A. Dowson | 1,551 | 36.3 |
| Labour | F. Cooke | 1,345 | 31.4 |
| Labour | M. Stonham | 1,248 | 29.2 |
| Turnout | | 4,278 | 42.9 |
| Registered electors | | 9,971 | |
| Conservative gain from Labour | | | |
| Conservative hold | | | |
| Conservative hold | | | |

=== Wittering ===
Wittering
| Party | Candidate | Votes | % | ±% |
|---|---|---|---|---|
| Conservative | J. Horrell | 850 | 70.9 | +19.5 |
| Labour | M. Beaver | 349 | 29.1 | +16.5 |
| Majority | | 501 | 41.8 | +12.4 |
| Turnout | | 1,199 | 81.0 | +38.5 |
| Registered electors | | 1,481 | | |
| Conservative hold | | Swing | ▲1.5 | |
