= 2002 Peterborough City Council election =

Local election in Peterborough, England

The 2002 Peterborough City Council election took place on 2 May 2002 to elect members of Peterborough City Council in England. This was on the same day as other local elections.

== Election result ==
2002 Peterborough City Council election
Party	This election			Full council			This election		
Party	Seats	Net	Seats %	Other	Total	Total %	Votes	Votes %	+/−
Conservative	13	▲3	68.4	17	30	52.6	16,223	51.6	+11.2
Labour	4	▼4	21.1	14	18	31.6	9,493	30.2	-9.0
Liberal Democrats	1	▲1	5.3	3	4	7.0	3,675	11.7	+2.5
Liberal	1	Steady	5.3	2	3	5.3	1,941	6.2	+0.8
Independent	0	Steady	0.0	1	1	1.8	103	0.3	-4.8
Independent Labour	0	Steady	0.0	1	1	1.8	N/A	N/A	N/A

== Ward results ==
=== Central ===
Central
Party	Candidate	Votes	%	±%
Conservative	Mohammed Younis	1,926	55.7	
Labour	Nazim Khan*	1,338	38.7	
Liberal	David Robson	192	5.6	
Majority		588	17.0	
Turnout		3,456	55.2	
Conservative gain from Labour		Swing		

=== Dogsthorpe ===
Dogsthorpe
Party	Candidate	Votes	%	±%
Liberal	Raymond Pobgee*	1,052	69.6	
Labour	Jane Goodacre	265	17.5	
Conservative	Aileen Stead	195	12.9	
Majority		787	52.1	
Turnout		1,512	26.9	
Liberal hold		Swing		

=== East ===
East
Party	Candidate	Votes	%	±%
Conservative	Stephen Goldspink	921	50.7	
Labour	Jarrett Ledgister	685	37.7	
Liberal Democrats	Betty Smith	211	11.6	
Majority		236	13.0	
Turnout		1,817	29.9	
Conservative gain from Labour		Swing		

=== Eye and Thorney ===
Eye and Thorney
Party	Candidate	Votes	%	±%
Conservative	David Sanders*	1,007	69.2	
Labour	Stephen Lawrence	448	30.8	
Majority		559	38.4	
Turnout		1,455	34.1	
Conservative hold		Swing		

=== Fletton ===
Fletton
Party	Candidate	Votes	%	±%
Labour	Trevor Withers*	751	51.4	
Conservative	Amanda Vigar	533	36.5	
Liberal Democrats	Gavin Booth	176	12.1	
Majority		218	14.9	
Turnout		1,460	24.3	
Labour hold		Swing		

=== Glinton ===
Glinton
Party	Candidate	Votes	%	±%
Conservative	John Holdrich*	878	79.0	
Labour	Carol Fisher	118	10.6	
Liberal Democrats	Stewart Davies	116	10.4	
Majority		760	68.3	
Turnout		1,112	45.5	
Conservative hold		Swing		

=== Newborough ===
Newborough
Party	Candidate	Votes	%	±%
Conservative	Neville Sanders*	571	80.8	
Labour	Christopher Whitworth	136	19.2	
Majority		435	61.5	
Turnout		707	38.6	
Conservative hold		Swing		

=== North Bretton ===
North Bretton
Party	Candidate	Votes	%	±%
Labour	Harmesh Lakhanpaul*	693	50.8	
Conservative	Sheila Scott	479	35.1	
Liberal Democrats	Rohan Wilson	191	14.0	
Majority		214	15.7	
Turnout		1,363	23.3	
Labour hold		Swing		

=== Northborough ===
Northborough
Party	Candidate	Votes	%	±%
Conservative	Benjamin Franklin*	566	76.7	
Labour	Geoffrey Jackson	172	23.3	
Majority		394	53.4	
Turnout		738	37.7	
Conservative hold		Swing		

=== Orton Longueville ===
Orton Longueville
Party	Candidate	Votes	%	±%
Conservative	Graham Murphy	696	43.1	
Labour	Margaret Cochrane	610	37.8	
Liberal	Albert Clarke	309	19.1	
Majority		86	5.3	
Turnout		1,615	25.6	
Conservative gain from Labour		Swing		

=== Orton Waterville ===
Orton Waterville
Party	Candidate	Votes	%	±%
Liberal Democrats	Isobel Bain	1,023	45.9	
Conservative	Mario D'Andrea*	919	41.2	
Labour	Mark Goffrey*	287	12.9	
Majority		104	4.7	
Turnout		2,229	33.9	
Liberal Democrats gain from Conservative		Swing		

=== Park ===
Park
Party	Candidate	Votes	%	±%
Conservative	Pamela Kreling*	1,329	57.3	
Labour	Mohammed Hussain	672	29.0	
Liberal Democrats	William Wright	317	13.7	
Majority		657	28.3	
Turnout		2,318	37.9	
Conservative hold		Swing		

=== Paston ===
Paston
Party	Candidate	Votes	%	±%
Labour	Colin Caborn*	487	44.4	
Conservative	Brian Hutchinson	336	30.6	
Liberal Democrats	Simon Evans	274	25.0	
Majority		151	13.8	
Turnout		1,097	19.7	
Labour hold		Swing		

=== Ravensthorpe ===
Ravensthorpe
Party	Candidate	Votes	%	±%
Conservative	Gul Nawaz	1,056	53.8	
Labour	Mary Rainey*	768	39.1	
Liberal Democrats	Tat Kong	140	7.1	
Majority		288	14.7	
Turnout		1,964	33.8	
Conservative gain from Labour		Swing		

=== Stanground ===
Stanground
Party	Candidate	Votes	%	±%
Labour	Ann Sylvester	977	54.3	
Conservative	Paul Rudd*	708	39.4	
Liberal Democrats	Cleveland Walker	114	6.3	
Majority		269	15.0	
Turnout		1,799	29.2	
Labour gain from Conservative		Swing		

=== Werrington North ===
Werrington North
Party	Candidate	Votes	%	±%
Conservative	John Fox	974	60.6	
Labour	Marie Stonham	372	23.2	
Liberal Democrats	Dorian East	260	16.2	
Majority		602	37.5	
Turnout		1,606	28.7	
Conservative gain from Labour		Swing		

=== Werrington South ===
Werrington South
Party	Candidate	Votes	%	±%
Conservative	Lee Gilbert	1,112	51.4	
Liberal Democrats	Darren Fower*	781	36.1	
Labour	Michelle White	271	12.5	
Majority		331	15.3	
Turnout		2,164	39.4	
Conservative hold		Swing		

=== West ===
West
Party	Candidate	Votes	%	±%
Conservative	David Thorpe*	1,551	67.9	
Labour	David Westbrook	373	16.3	
Liberal Democrats	Christopher Spencer	258	11.3	
Independent	Anthony Stoneham	103	4.5	
Majority		1,178	51.6	
Turnout		2,285	38.2	
Conservative hold		Swing		

=== Wittering ===
Wittering
Party	Candidate	Votes	%	±%
Conservative	John Horrell*	466	63.1	
Liberal Democrats	Philip Chilvers	202	27.4	
Labour	Michael Beaver	70	9.5	
Majority		264	35.8	
Turnout		738	34.6	
Conservative hold		Swing		
