= 1994 Peterborough City Council election =

Peterborough City Council election

| ← 1992 | 5 May 1994 | 1995 → |

16 out of 49 seats to Peterborough City Council 25 seats needed for a majority
- Turnout: 37.7% (▲2.1%)

| | First party | Second party | Third party |
|---|---|---|---|
| Party | Conservative | Labour | Liberal |
| Last election | 22 seats, 52.4% | 20 seats, 34.6% | 5 seats, 5.6% |
| Seats won | 5 | 9 | 1 |
| Seats after | 22 | 20 | 5 |
| Seat change | Steady | Steady | Steady |
| Popular vote | 11,700 | 15,158 | 3,167 |
| Percentage | 33.3% | 43.2% | 9.0% |
| Swing | ▼19.1% | ▲8.6% | ▲2.4% |
| | Fourth party | Fifth party |
| Party | Liberal Democrats | Independent |
| Last election | 1 seat, 6.3% | 1 seat, 0.3% |
| Seats won | 1 | 0 |
| Seats after | 1 | 1 |
| Seat change | Steady | Steady |
| Popular vote | 4,349 | 140 |
| Percentage | 12.4% | 0.4% |
| Swing | ▲6.1% | ▲0.1% |
- Winner of each seat at the 1994 Peterborough City Council election
Council control before election
No overall control
Council control after election
No overall control

The 1994 Peterborough City Council election took place on 5 May 1994 to elect members of Peterborough City Council in England. This was on the same day as other local elections.

== Summary ==
=== Election result ===
1994 Peterborough City Council election
| Party | This election | | | Full council | | | This election | | |
| Party | Seats | Net | Seats % | Other | Total | Total % | Votes | Votes % | +/− |
|---|---|---|---|---|---|---|---|---|---|
| Conservative | 5 | Steady | 31.3 | 17 | 22 | 44.9 | 11,700 | 33.3 | -19.1 |
| Labour | 9 | Steady | 56.3 | 11 | 20 | 40.8 | 15,158 | 43.2 | +8.6 |
| Liberal | 1 | Steady | 6.3 | 4 | 5 | 10.2 | 3,167 | 9.0 | +2.4 |
| Liberal Democrats | 1 | Steady | 6.3 | 1 | 1 | 2.0 | 4,349 | 12.4 | +6.1 |
| Independent | 0 | Steady | 0.0 | 1 | 1 | 2.0 | 140 | 0.4 | +0.1 |
| Independent Labour | 0 | Steady | 0.0 | 0 | 0 | 0.0 | 608 | 1.7 | N/A |

== Ward results ==
=== Bretton ===
Bretton
| Party | Candidate | Votes | % | ±% |
|---|---|---|---|---|
| Labour | L. Rimes* | 934 | 53.0 | +10.5 |
| Conservative | M. Thompson | 566 | 32.1 | –20.4 |
| Liberal Democrats | J. Sanford | 261 | 14.8 | +9.8 |
| Majority | | 368 | 20.9 | N/A |
| Turnout | | 1,761 | 33.1 | +1.0 |
| Registered electors | | 5,323 | | |
| Labour hold | | Swing | ▲15.5 | |

=== Central ===
Central
| Party | Candidate | Votes | % | ±% |
|---|---|---|---|---|
| Labour | M. Ayoub* | 1,434 | 66.9 | +21.5 |
| Conservative | S. Suri | 710 | 33.1 | –13.8 |
| Majority | | 724 | 33.8 | N/A |
| Turnout | | 2,144 | 44.8 | +2.5 |
| Registered electors | | 4,789 | | |
| Labour hold | | Swing | ▲17.7 | |

=== Dogsthorpe ===
Dogsthorpe
| Party | Candidate | Votes | % | ±% |
|---|---|---|---|---|
| Liberal | R. Day* | 1,429 | 66.1 | +4.0 |
| Labour | S. Pinder | 545 | 25.2 | +5.7 |
| Conservative | S. Hillson | 187 | 8.7 | –9.7 |
| Majority | | 884 | 40.9 | –1.7 |
| Turnout | | 2,161 | 36.1 | +3.0 |
| Registered electors | | 5,978 | | |
| Liberal hold | | Swing | ▼0.9 | |

=== East ===
East
| Party | Candidate | Votes | % | ±% |
|---|---|---|---|---|
| Labour | A. Dowson | 1,138 | 44.7 | –5.3 |
| Conservative | J. Peach | 935 | 36.8 | –13.2 |
| Liberal | D. Robson | 279 | 11.0 | N/A |
| Independent Labour | C. Knipe | 192 | 7.5 | N/A |
| Majority | | 203 | 8.0 | +8.0 |
| Turnout | | 2,544 | 39.8 | +11.8 |
| Registered electors | | 6,390 | | |
| Labour hold | | Swing | ▲4.0 | |

=== Fletton ===
Fletton
| Party | Candidate | Votes | % | ±% |
|---|---|---|---|---|
| Labour | R. Elding | 1,291 | 64.8 | +14.8 |
| Conservative | D. Ricciardi | 438 | 22.0 | –22.5 |
| Liberal Democrats | T. Smith | 262 | 13.2 | +7.7 |
| Majority | | 853 | 42.8 | +37.3 |
| Turnout | | 1,991 | 30.9 | –0.7 |
| Registered electors | | 6,431 | | |
| Labour hold | | Swing | ▲18.7 | |

=== North ===
North
| Party | Candidate | Votes | % | ±% |
|---|---|---|---|---|
| Labour | P. Baylis | 1,007 | 63.7 | –1.1 |
| Conservative | A. Semper | 288 | 18.2 | –17.0 |
| Liberal | R. Keyes | 199 | 12.6 | N/A |
| Liberal Democrats | L. Martin | 87 | 5.5 | N/A |
| Majority | | 719 | 45.5 | +15.9 |
| Turnout | | 1,581 | 34.2 | –3.3 |
| Registered electors | | 4,622 | | |
| Labour hold | | Swing | ▲8.0 | |

=== Orton Longueville ===
Orton Longueville
| Party | Candidate | Votes | % | ±% |
|---|---|---|---|---|
| Labour | C. Weaver* | 1,558 | 54.5 | +15.8 |
| Conservative | L. Marwick | 854 | 29.8 | –25.2 |
| Liberal Democrats | S. Watkin | 360 | 12.6 | +6.3 |
| Independent Labour | R. Newall | 89 | 3.1 | N/A |
| Majority | | 704 | 24.7 | N/A |
| Turnout | | 2,861 | 38.4 | +2.2 |
| Registered electors | | 7,440 | | |
| Labour hold | | Swing | ▲20.5 | |

=== Park ===
Park
| Party | Candidate | Votes | % | ±% |
|---|---|---|---|---|
| Conservative | Y. Lowndes* | 1,395 | 51.3 | –12.5 |
| Labour | J. Reece | 895 | 32.9 | +12.7 |
| Liberal Democrats | S. Cork | 429 | 15.8 | +6.4 |
| Majority | | 500 | 18.4 | –25.2 |
| Turnout | | 2,719 | 42.0 | +0.4 |
| Registered electors | | 6,468 | | |
| Conservative hold | | Swing | ▼12.6 | |

=== Paston ===
Paston
| Party | Candidate | Votes | % | ±% |
|---|---|---|---|---|
| Labour | C. Lovatt-Dugan | 496 | 36.5 | –13.3 |
| Independent Labour | J. Dalgarno* | 327 | 24.1 | N/A |
| Conservative | C. Porteious | 269 | 19.8 | –17.8 |
| Liberal | S. Wiggin | 266 | 19.6 | +13.2 |
| Majority | | 169 | 12.4 | +0.2 |
| Turnout | | 1,358 | 29.4 | –3.4 |
| Registered electors | | 4,612 | | |
| Labour hold | | | | |

=== Ravensthorpe ===
Ravensthorpe
| Party | Candidate | Votes | % | ±% |
|---|---|---|---|---|
| Labour | L. Wilson | 960 | 47.9 | +6.4 |
| Liberal | C. Ash* | 911 | 45.4 | +3.7 |
| Conservative | D. Hilson | 134 | 6.7 | –10.2 |
| Majority | | 49 | 2.4 | N/A |
| Turnout | | 2,005 | 38.4 | +10.3 |
| Registered electors | | 5,215 | | |
| Labour hold | | Swing | ▲1.4 | |

=== Stanground ===
Stanground
| Party | Candidate | Votes | % | ±% |
|---|---|---|---|---|
| Labour | R. Palmer* | 1,585 | 57.1 | +18.1 |
| Conservative | R. Crick | 934 | 33.6 | –23.1 |
| Liberal Democrats | S. Crowe | 258 | 9.3 | +5.0 |
| Majority | | 651 | 23.4 | N/A |
| Turnout | | 2,777 | 42.8 | +0.6 |
| Registered electors | | 6,492 | | |
| Labour hold | | Swing | ▲20.6 | |

=== Thorney ===
Thorney
| Party | Candidate | Votes | % | ±% |
|---|---|---|---|---|
| Conservative | J. Bartlett* | 608 | 77.4 | +0.6 |
| Labour | K. Hubback | 178 | 22.6 | –0.6 |
| Majority | | 430 | 54.7 | +1.8 |
| Turnout | | 786 | 46.1 | –5.0 |
| Registered electors | | 1,706 | | |
| Conservative hold | | Swing | ▲0.6 | |

=== Walton ===
Walton
| Party | Candidate | Votes | % | ±% |
|---|---|---|---|---|
| Liberal Democrats | M. Jackson | 962 | 44.3 | +18.9 |
| Labour | W. Burke | 591 | 27.2 | +0.5 |
| Conservative | B. Franklin | 537 | 24.7 | –18.5 |
| Liberal | E. Donnelly | 83 | 3.8 | N/A |
| Majority | | 371 | 17.1 | N/A |
| Turnout | | 2,173 | 42.0 | +4.4 |
| Registered electors | | 5,168 | | |
| Liberal Democrats hold | | Swing | ▲9.2 | |

=== Werrington ===
Werrington
| Party | Candidate | Votes | % | ±% |
|---|---|---|---|---|
| Conservative | A. May* | 1,523 | 41.9 | –25.5 |
| Labour | D. Meinert | 1,164 | 32.0 | +10.8 |
| Liberal Democrats | G. Bishop | 952 | 26.2 | +14.8 |
| Majority | | 359 | 9.9 | –36.4 |
| Turnout | | 3,639 | 32.7 | +1.5 |
| Registered electors | | 11,120 | | |
| Conservative hold | | Swing | ▼18.2 | |

=== West ===
West
| Party | Candidate | Votes | % | ±% |
|---|---|---|---|---|
| Conservative | K. Stewart | 1,995 | 50.1 | –21.0 |
| Labour | M. Dale | 1,302 | 32.7 | +12.2 |
| Liberal Democrats | S. McBride | 689 | 17.3 | +10.3 |
| Majority | | 693 | 17.4 | –33.2 |
| Turnout | | 3,986 | 40.1 | +2.9 |
| Registered electors | | 9,944 | | |
| Conservative hold | | Swing | ▼16.6 | |

=== Wittering ===
Wittering
| Party | Candidate | Votes | % | ±% |
|---|---|---|---|---|
| Conservative | J. Powell | 327 | 51.4 | –15.6 |
| Independent | M. Hedges* | 140 | 22.0 | N/A |
| Liberal Democrats | A. Nash | 89 | 14.0 | N/A |
| Labour | M. Beaver | 80 | 12.6 | –20.4 |
| Majority | | 187 | 29.4 | –4.6 |
| Turnout | | 636 | 42.5 | –0.1 |
| Registered electors | | 1,496 | | |
| Conservative hold | | | | |
