= 1995 Peterborough City Council election =

Peterborough City Council election

← 1994	4 May 1995	1996 →

16 out of 49 seats to Peterborough City Council 25 seats needed for a majority

	First party	Second party	Third party
Party	Labour	Conservative	Liberal
Last election	20 seats, 43.2%	19 seats, 33.3%	5 seats, 9.0%
Seats won	11	3	1
Seats after	24	19	4
Seat change	▲4	▼3	▼1
Popular vote	15,494	9,964	1,912
Percentage	52.3%	31.6%	6.1%
Swing	▲9.1%	▼1.7%	▼2.9%
	Fourth party	Fifth party
Party	Liberal Democrats	Independent
Last election	1 seat, 12.4%	1 seat, 0.4%
Seats won	0	1
Seats after	1	1
Seat change	Steady	Steady
Popular vote	2,432	363
Percentage	7.7%	1.2%
Swing	▼4.7%	▲0.8%
- Winner of each seat at the 1995 Peterborough City Council election
Council control before election
No overall control
Council control after election
No overall control

The 1995 Peterborough City Council election took place on 4 May 1995 to elect members of Peterborough City Council in England. This was on the same day as other local elections.

== Election result ==
1995 Peterborough City Council election
Party	This election			Full council			This election		
Party	Seats	Net	Seats %	Other	Total	Total %	Votes	Votes %	+/−
Labour	11	▲4	68.8	13	24	49.0	16,494	52.3	+9.1
Conservative	3	▼3	18.8	16	19	38.8	9,964	31.6	-1.7
Liberal	1	▼1	6.3	3	4	8.2	1,912	6.1	-2.9
Liberal Democrats	0	Steady	0.0	1	1	2.0	2,432	7.7	-4.7
Independent	1	Steady	6.3	0	1	2.0	363	1.2	+0.8
Ind. Conservative	0	Steady	0.0	0	0	0.0	342	1.1	N/A
Natural Law	0	Steady	0.0	0	0	0.0	35	0.1	N/A

== Ward results ==
=== Bretton ===
Bretton
Party	Candidate	Votes	%	±%
Labour	M. Rainey*	1,024	65.6	+12.6
Conservative	M. Thompson	397	25.4	–6.7
Liberal Democrats	K. Scott	141	9.0	–5.8
Majority		627	40.1	+19.2
Turnout		1,562	30.1	–3.0
Labour hold		Swing	▲9.7	

=== Central ===
Central
Party	Candidate	Votes	%	±%
Labour	M. Hussain	1,335	53.1	–13.8
Conservative	M. Suleman	1,180	46.9	+13.8
Majority		155	6.2	–27.6
Turnout		2,515	54.2	+9.4
Labour hold		Swing	▼13.8	

=== Dogsthorpe ===
Dogsthorpe
Party	Candidate	Votes	%	±%
Liberal	K. Duell	935	51.2	–14.9
Labour	J. Goude	697	38.2	+13.0
Conservative	M. Tee	193	10.6	+1.9
Majority		238	13.0	–27.9
Turnout		1,825	31.1	–5.0
Liberal hold		Swing	▼14.0	

=== East ===
East
Party	Candidate	Votes	%	±%
Labour	M. Todd	1,285	55.0	+10.3
Conservative	J. Peach	918	39.3	+2.5
Liberal	C. Ash	134	5.7	–5.3
Majority		367	15.7	+7.7
Turnout		2,337	36.8	–3.0
Labour hold		Swing	▲3.9	

=== Eye ===
Eye
Party	Candidate	Votes	%	±%
Labour	Z. Bishrey	539	60.0	+3.7
Conservative	A. Semper	359	40.0	+3.2
Majority		180	20.0	+0.5
Turnout		898	41.9	–5.4
Labour hold		Swing	▲0.3	

=== Fletton ===
Fletton
Party	Candidate	Votes	%	±%
Labour	A. Chalmers*	1,374	78.7	+13.9
Conservative	P. Grimwood	371	21.3	–0.7
Majority		1,003	57.5	+14.7
Turnout		1,745	27.1	–3.8
Labour hold		Swing	▲7.3	

=== Newborough ===
Newborough
Party	Candidate	Votes	%	±%
Independent	N. Sanders*	363	62.8	–9.6
Labour	S. Bradley	215	37.2	+17.7
Majority		148	25.6	–27.3
Turnout		578	40.7	–4.1
Independent hold		Swing	▼13.7	

=== North ===
North
Party	Candidate	Votes	%	±%
Labour	W. Burke	1,147	73.9	+10.2
Conservative	D. Ricciardi	187	12.0	–6.2
Liberal Democrats	L. Martin	110	7.1	+1.6
Liberal	D. Robson	109	7.0	–5.6
Majority		960	61.8	+16.3
Turnout		1,553	34.0	–0.2
Labour hold		Swing	▲8.2	

=== Northborough ===
Northborough
Party	Candidate	Votes	%	±%
Conservative	B. Franklin	497	56.9	–21.3
Labour	M. Beaver	253	28.9	+7.1
Liberal Democrats	E. Acris	124	14.2	N/A
Majority		244	27.9	–28.4
Turnout		874	42.9	–1.9
Conservative hold		Swing	▼14.2	

=== Orton Longueville ===
Orton Longueville
Party	Candidate	Votes	%	±%
Labour	M. Goffrey*	1,525	62.6	+8.1
Conservative	B. Picton	656	26.9	–2.9
Liberal Democrats	A. Nash	221	9.1	–3.5
Natural Law	C. Brettell	35	1.4	N/A
Majority		869	35.7	+11.0
Turnout		2,437	33.0	–5.4
Labour hold		Swing	▲5.5	

=== Orton Waterville ===
Orton Waterville
Party	Candidate	Votes	%	±%
Conservative	M. Cereste	1,105	45.0	–8.8
Labour	C. Hubback	1,002	40.8	+13.8
Liberal Democrats	S. Watkin	349	14.2	–5.0
Majority		103	4.2	–22.6
Turnout		2,456	36.6	–7.4
Conservative hold		Swing	▼11.3	

=== Park ===
Park
Party	Candidate	Votes	%	±%
Labour	C. Edwards	1,008	41.8	+8.9
Conservative	R. Bringeman*	787	32.6	–18.7
Ind. Conservative	B. Duckworth*	342	14.2	N/A
Liberal Democrats	S. Cork	211	8.7	–7.1
Liberal	A. Keyes	64	2.7	N/A
Majority		221	9.2	N/A
Turnout		2,412	37.2	–4.8
Labour gain from Conservative		Swing	▲13.8	

=== Ravensthorpe ===
Ravensthorpe
Party	Candidate	Votes	%	±%
Labour	A. Cox	1,143	63.0	+15.1
Liberal	R. Hughes*	670	37.0	–8.4
Majority		473	26.1	+23.7
Turnout		1,813	35.9	–2.5
Labour gain from Liberal		Swing	▲11.8	

=== Stanground ===
Stanground
Party	Candidate	Votes	%	±%
Labour	J. Reece	1,564	59.2	+2.1
Conservative	B. Sneesby*	925	35.0	+1.4
Liberal Democrats	S. Crowe	151	5.7	–3.6
Majority		639	24.2	+0.8
Turnout		2,640	40.7	–2.1
Labour gain from Conservative		Swing	▲0.4	

=== Walton ===
Walton
Party	Candidate	Votes	%	±%
Conservative	J. Roberts*	767	34.5	+9.8
Labour	M. Dale	759	34.1	+6.9
Liberal Democrats	J. Sandford	699	31.4	–12.9
Majority		8	0.4	N/A
Turnout		2,225	42.9	+0.9
Conservative hold		Swing	▲1.5	

=== West ===
West
Party	Candidate	Votes	%	±%
Labour	J. Johnson	1,624	44.2	+11.5
Conservative	R. Perkins*	1,622	44.2	–5.9
Liberal Democrats	S. McBride	426	11.6	–5.7
Majority		2	0.1	N/A
Turnout		3,672	36.8	–3.3
Labour gain from Conservative		Swing	▲8.7	
