= 2008 Peterborough City Council election =

Peterborough City Council election

Results of the 2008 Peterborough City Council election

The 2008 Peterborough City Council election took place on 1 May 2008 to elect members of Peterborough City Council in England. This was on the same day as other local elections.

== Election result ==
2008 Peterborough City Council election
Party	This election			Full council			This election		
Party	Seats	Net	Seats %	Other	Total	Total %	Votes	Votes %	+/−
Conservative	16	▲3	80.0	28	44	77.2	20,444	51.6	+5.6
Independent	1	▼2	5.0	5	6	10.5	4,542	11.5	+0.1
Liberal Democrats	1	▼1	5.0	2	3	5.3	4,014	10.1	+1.3
Liberal	1	Steady	5.0	2	3	5.3	1,845	4.7	-1.0
Labour	1	Steady	5.0	0	1	1.8	6,920	17.5	-5.4
Green	0	Steady	0.0	0	0	0.0	1,422	3.6	-0.8
UKIP	0	Steady	0.0	0	0	0.0	423	1.1	+0.4
