= 1991 Peterborough City Council election =

Peterborough City Council election

← 1990	2 May 1991	1992 →

16 out of 49 seats to Peterborough City Council 25 seats needed for a majority
- Turnout: 40.7%

	First party	Second party	Third party
Party	Labour	Conservative	Liberal
Last election	23 seats, 48.5%	21 seats, 33.9%	1 seat, 9.2%
Seats won	7	6	2
Seats after	24	19	3
Seat change	▲1	▼2	▲2
Popular vote	14,159	15,701	2,952
Percentage	38.3%	42.5%	8.0%
Swing	▼10.2%	▲8.6%	▼1.2%
	Fourth party	Fifth party
Party	Liberal Democrats	Independent
Last election	4 seats, 6.5%	0 seats, 0.7%
Seats won	0	1
Seats after	2	1
Seat change	▼2	▲1
Popular vote	2,954	1,195
Percentage	8.0%	3.2%
Swing	▲1.5%	▲2.5%
- Winner of each seat at the 1991 Peterborough City Council election
Council control before election
No overall control
Council control after election
No overall control

The 1991 Peterborough City Council election took place on 2 May 1991 to elect members of Peterborough City Council in England. This was on the same day as other local elections.

== Summary ==
=== Election result ===
1991 Peterborough City Council election
Party	This election			Full council			This election		
Party	Seats	Net	Seats %	Other	Total	Total %	Votes	Votes %	+/−
Labour	7	▲1	43.8	17	24	49.0	14,159	38.3	-10.2
Conservative	6	▼2	37.5	13	19	38.8	15,701	42.5	+8.6
Liberal	2	▲2	12.5	1	3	6.1	2,952	8.0	-1.2
Liberal Democrats	0	▼2	0.0	2	2	4.1	2,954	8.0	+1.5
Independent	1	▲1	6.3	0	1	2.0	1,195	3.2	+2.5

== Ward results ==
=== Bretton ===
Bretton
Party	Candidate	Votes	%	±%
Labour	M. Rainey	964	46.0	
Conservative	B. Dunham*	873	41.7	
Liberal Democrats	J. Sandford	259	12.4	
Majority		91	4.3	
Turnout		2,096	37.4	
Registered electors		5,597		
Labour gain from Conservative		Swing		

=== Central ===
Central
Party	Candidate	Votes	%	±%
Labour	M. Hussain*	1,381	56.7	
Conservative	S. Suri	1,054	43.3	
Majority		327	13.4	
Turnout		2,435	47.1	
Registered electors		5,173		
Labour hold		Swing		

=== Dogsthorpe ===
Dogsthorpe
Party	Candidate	Votes	%	±%
Liberal	E. Murat	1,240	52.3	
Independent	L. Wallace	712	30.0	
Conservative	A. Stead	418	17.6	
Majority		528	22.3	
Turnout		2,370	37.1	
Registered electors		6,392		
Liberal gain from Liberal Democrats		Swing		

=== East ===
East
Party	Candidate	Votes	%	±%
Labour	D. Channing*	1,137	59.3	
Conservative	M. Butler	780	40.7	
Majority		357	18.6	
Turnout		1,917	31.8	
Registered electors		6,027		
Labour hold		Swing		

=== Eye ===
Eye
Party	Candidate	Votes	%	±%
Labour	D. Williams*	543	56.3	
Conservative	A. Semper	355	36.8	
Liberal Democrats	T. Smith	66	6.8	
Majority		188	19.5	
Turnout		964	47.3	
Registered electors		2,038		
Labour hold		Swing		

=== Fletton ===
Fletton
Party	Candidate	Votes	%	±%
Labour	A. Chalmers*	1,554	69.2	
Conservative	J. Tiplady	692	30.8	
Majority		862	38.4	
Turnout		2,246	34.2	
Registered electors		6,564		
Labour hold		Swing		

=== Newborough ===
Newborough
Party	Candidate	Votes	%	±%
Independent	N. Sanders*	483	72.4	
Labour	B. Keegan	130	19.5	
Liberal Democrats	A. Woodford	54	8.1	
Majority		353	52.9	
Turnout		667	44.8	
Registered electors		1,488		
Independent gain from Conservative		Swing		

=== North ===
North
Party	Candidate	Votes	%	±%
Labour	K. Luckey*	1,334	67.5	
Conservative	P. Gale	643	32.5	
Majority		691	35.0	
Turnout		1,977	40.3	
Registered electors		4,904		
Labour hold		Swing		

=== Northborough ===
Northborough
Party	Candidate	Votes	%	±%
Conservative	D. Hedges*	712	78.2	
Labour	N. Duncan	199	21.8	
Majority		513	56.4	
Turnout		911	43.1	
Registered electors		2,113		
Conservative hold		Swing		

=== Orton Longueville ===
Orton Longueville
Party	Candidate	Votes	%	±%
Labour	M. Goffrey	1,442	44.9	
Conservative	H. Scott	1,419	44.2	
Liberal Democrats	J. Gee	350	10.9	
Majority		23	0.7	
Turnout		3,211	42.8	
Registered electors		7,498		
Labour gain from Conservative		Swing		

=== Orton Waterville ===
Orton Waterville
Party	Candidate	Votes	%	±%
Conservative	R. Bringeman	1,685	53.8	
Labour	P. Clements	845	27.0	
Liberal Democrats	A. Yates	603	19.2	
Majority		840	26.8	
Turnout		2,530	44.0	
Registered electors		7,113		
Conservative hold		Swing		

=== Park ===
Park
Party	Candidate	Votes	%	±%
Conservative	B. Duckworth	1,745	54.2	
Labour	L. Norris	807	25.1	
Liberal	D. Robson	666	20.7	
Majority		938	29.1	
Turnout		3,218	51.2	
Registered electors		6,283		
Conservative gain from Liberal Democrats		Swing		

=== Ravensthorpe ===
Ravensthorpe
Party	Candidate	Votes	%	±%
Liberal	R. Hughes	1,046	50.9	
Labour	H. Lakhanpaul	797	38.8	
Conservative	M. Tahir	210	10.2	
Majority		249	12.1	
Turnout		2,053	34.2	
Registered electors		6,007		
Liberal gain from Labour		Swing		

=== Stanground ===
Stanground
Party	Candidate	Votes	%	±%
Conservative	C. Sneesby*	1,523	51.2	
Labour	M. Todd	1,211	40.7	
Liberal Democrats	S. Crowe	239	8.0	
Majority		312	10.5	
Turnout		2,973	47.0	
Registered electors		6,329		
Conservative hold		Swing		

=== Walton ===
Walton
Party	Candidate	Votes	%	±%
Conservative	J. Roberts*	1,185	44.5	
Liberal Democrats	A. Taylor	850	32.0	
Labour	R. Britton	625	23.5	
Majority		335	12.5	
Turnout		2,660	47.5	
Registered electors		5,605		
Conservative hold		Swing		

=== West ===
West
Party	Candidate	Votes	%	±%
Conservative	R. Perkins*	2,407	58.3	
Labour	A. Dowson	1,190	28.8	
Liberal Democrats	W. Oldroyd	533	12.9	
Majority		1,217	29.5	
Turnout		4,130	40.8	
Registered electors		10,118		
Conservative hold		Swing		
