= 2012 Peterborough City Council election =

2012 UK local government election

Results of the 2012 Peterborough City Council election

The 2012 Peterborough City Council election took place on 3 May 2012 to elect members of Peterborough City Council in England. The last time these seats were up for election was 2008. This was on the same day as other local elections.

The number of seats up for election were 19 (one per ward). The Conservatives retained overall control of Peterborough City Council.

== Election result ==
2012 Peterborough City Council election
| Party | This election | | | Full council | | | This election | | |
| Party | Seats | Net | Seats % | Other | Total | Total % | Votes | Votes % | +/− |
|---|---|---|---|---|---|---|---|---|---|
| Conservative | 9 | ▼6 | 47.4 | 26 | 35 | 61.4 | 14,681 | 40.8 | -2.3 |
| Labour | 6 | ▲5 | 31.6 | 4 | 10 | 17.5 | 11,794 | 32.7 | +1.3 |
| Independent | 0 | ▼1 | 0.0 | 4 | 4 | 7.0 | 1,547 | 4.3 | +1.0 |
| Liberal Democrats | 2 | ▲1 | 10.5 | 1 | 3 | 5.3 | 2,044 | 5.7 | +1.9 |
| Liberal | 1 | Steady | 5.3 | 2 | 3 | 5.3 | 1,016 | 2.8 | -1.3 |
| Werrington Ind. | 1 | ▲1 | 5.3 | 1 | 2 | 3.5 | 1,368 | 3.8 | +0.2 |
| UKIP | 0 | Steady | 0.0 | 0 | 0 | 0.0 | 2,038 | 5.7 | +0.9 |
| Green | 0 | Steady | 0.0 | 0 | 0 | 0.0 | 807 | 2.2 | +0.8 |
| Peterborough Ind. | 0 | Steady | 0.0 | 0 | 0 | 0.0 | 311 | 0.9 | -1.0 |
| English Democrat | 0 | Steady | 0.0 | 0 | 0 | 0.0 | 269 | 0.7 | -2.9 |
| TUSC | 0 | Steady | 0.0 | 0 | 0 | 0.0 | 103 | 0.3 | N/A |
| Socialist Equality | 0 | Steady | 0.0 | 0 | 0 | 0.0 | 40 | 0.1 | N/A |

== Ward results ==
=== Barnack ===
Barnack
| Party | Candidate | Votes | % | ±% |
|---|---|---|---|---|
| Conservative | David Over* | 572 | 68.3 | |
| Labour | Alexander Hall | 143 | 17.1 | |
| UKIP | Alex Jamieson | 123 | 14.7 | |
| Majority | | 429 | 51.2 | |
| Turnout | | 838 | 36.7 | |
| Conservative hold | | Swing | | |

=== Bretton North ===
Bretton North
| Party | Candidate | Votes | % | ±% |
|---|---|---|---|---|
| Labour | Ann Sylvester | 590 | 32.7 | |
| Conservative | Daniel Bird | 423 | 23.4 | |
| Independent | Pat Nash* | 397 | 22.0 | |
| UKIP | Frances Fox | 272 | 15.1 | |
| Liberal Democrats | Malcolm Pollack | 83 | 4.6 | |
| Socialist Equality | Steve Woodbridge | 40 | 2.2 | |
| Majority | | 167 | 9.3 | |
| Turnout | | 1,805 | 27.2 | |
| Labour gain from Conservative | | Swing | | |

=== Central ===
Central
| Party | Candidate | Votes | % | ±% |
|---|---|---|---|---|
| Labour | Nazim Khan | 2,194 | 50.8 | |
| Conservative | Mohammed Sabeel | 1,912 | 44.3 | |
| Green | Ian Tennant | 211 | 4.9 | |
| Majority | | 282 | 6.5 | |
| Turnout | | 4,317 | 54.2 | |
| Labour hold | | Swing | | |

=== Dogsthorpe ===
Dogsthorpe
| Party | Candidate | Votes | % | ±% |
|---|---|---|---|---|
| Liberal | Adrian Miners* | 1,016 | 60.1 | |
| Labour | Kevin Bull | 420 | 24.9 | |
| UKIP | Roger Herdman | 134 | 7.9 | |
| Conservative | Bob Bailey | 120 | 7.1 | |
| Majority | | 596 | 35.3 | |
| Turnout | | 1,690 | 25.5 | |
| Liberal hold | | Swing | | |

=== East ===
East
| Party | Candidate | Votes | % | ±% |
|---|---|---|---|---|
| Labour | Jo Johnson | 882 | 47.9 | |
| Conservative | June Bull | 617 | 33.5 | |
| Green | Paul Furnborough | 208 | 11.3 | |
| Liberal Democrats | Abid Hussain | 133 | 7.2 | |
| Majority | | 265 | 14.4 | |
| Turnout | | 1,840 | 24.4 | |
| Labour gain from Conservative | | Swing | | |

=== Eye and Thorney ===
Eye and Thorney
| Party | Candidate | Votes | % | ±% |
|---|---|---|---|---|
| Conservative | Dale McKean | 694 | 45.1 | |
| Independent | Graham Murphy | 374 | 24.3 | |
| Labour | Ciaran McManus | 225 | 14.6 | |
| UKIP | Mary Herdman | 186 | 12.1 | |
| Green | Les Lazell | 60 | 3.9 | |
| Majority | | 320 | 20.8 | |
| Turnout | | 1,539 | 31.7 | |
| Conservative hold | | Swing | | |

=== Fletton ===
Fletton
| Party | Candidate | Votes | % | ±% |
|---|---|---|---|---|
| Labour | Nicholas Thulbourn | 744 | 42.2 | |
| Conservative | Pedro Faustino | 520 | 29.5 | |
| Independent | Fran Benton* | 319 | 18.1 | |
| Green | Michelle Cooper | 181 | 10.3 | |
| Majority | | 224 | 12.7 | |
| Turnout | | 1,764 | 21.7 | |
| Labour gain from Conservative | | Swing | | |

=== Glinton and Wittering ===
Glinton and Wittering
| Party | Candidate | Votes | % | ±% |
|---|---|---|---|---|
| Conservative | John Holdrich* | 1,157 | 81.3 | |
| Labour | Luke Pagliaro | 266 | 18.7 | |
| Majority | | 891 | 62.6 | |
| Turnout | | 1,423 | 27.7 | |
| Conservative hold | | Swing | | |

=== Orton Longueville ===
Orton Longueville
| Party | Candidate | Votes | % | ±% |
|---|---|---|---|---|
| Labour | Lisa Forbes | 886 | 47.4 | |
| Conservative | Pieter Smit | 599 | 32.0 | |
| UKIP | Alan Fromm | 283 | 15.1 | |
| TUSC | Mary Cooke | 103 | 5.5 | |
| Majority | | 287 | 15.3 | |
| Turnout | | 1,871 | 25.6 | |
| Labour gain from Conservative | | Swing | | |

=== Orton Waterville ===
Orton Waterville
| Party | Candidate | Votes | % | ±% |
|---|---|---|---|---|
| Conservative | Gavin Elsey* | 1,146 | 55.5 | |
| Labour | David Weaver | 509 | 24.7 | |
| UKIP | Ian McLaughlin | 409 | 19.8 | |
| Majority | | 637 | 30.9 | |
| Turnout | | 2,064 | 31.0 | |
| Conservative hold | | Swing | | |

=== Orton with Hampton ===
Orton with Hampton
| Party | Candidate | Votes | % | ±% |
|---|---|---|---|---|
| Conservative | David Seaton* | 788 | 46.9 | |
| Labour | Nigel Cornwell | 440 | 26.2 | |
| Peterborough Ind. | Roger Antunes | 311 | 18.5 | |
| Liberal Democrats | Christopher Wiggin | 142 | 8.4 | |
| Majority | | 348 | 20.7 | |
| Turnout | | 1,681 | 18.1 | |
| Conservative hold | | Swing | | |

=== Park ===
Park
| Party | Candidate | Votes | % | ±% |
|---|---|---|---|---|
| Conservative | John Peach* | 1,530 | 51.7 | |
| Labour | Nicola Day-Dempsey | 1,284 | 43.4 | |
| Green | Fiona Radic | 147 | 5.0 | |
| Majority | | 246 | 8.3 | |
| Turnout | | 2,961 | 43.5 | |
| Conservative hold | | Swing | | |

=== Paston ===
Paston
| Party | Candidate | Votes | % | ±% |
|---|---|---|---|---|
| Labour | John Knowles | 687 | 50.3 | |
| Conservative | David Day* | 678 | 49.7 | |
| Majority | | 9 | 0.7 | |
| Turnout | | 1,365 | 23.0 | |
| Labour gain from Conservative | | Swing | | |

=== Ravensthorpe ===
Ravensthorpe
| Party | Candidate | Votes | % | ±% |
|---|---|---|---|---|
| Conservative | Gul Nawaz* | 926 | 56.2 | |
| Labour | Glennis Bentley | 589 | 35.8 | |
| UKIP | Paul McLaughlin | 132 | 8.0 | |
| Majority | | 337 | 20.5 | |
| Turnout | | 1,647 | 32.8 | |
| Conservative hold | | Swing | | |

=== Stanground Central ===
Stanground Central
| Party | Candidate | Votes | % | ±% |
|---|---|---|---|---|
| Conservative | Irene Walsh | 719 | 39.0 | |
| Labour | Ron Graves | 701 | 38.1 | |
| English Democrat | Nick Capp | 269 | 14.6 | |
| Independent | Julien Bray | 153 | 8.3 | |
| Majority | | 18 | 1.0 | |
| Turnout | | 1,842 | 26.5 | |
| Conservative hold | | Swing | | |

=== Walton ===
Walton
| Party | Candidate | Votes | % | ±% |
|---|---|---|---|---|
| Liberal Democrats | Nick Sandford* | 718 | 57.8 | |
| Conservative | Rachel Day | 286 | 23.0 | |
| Labour | Sue Johnson | 238 | 19.2 | |
| Majority | | 432 | 34.8 | |
| Turnout | | 1,242 | 29.1 | |
| Liberal Democrats hold | | Swing | | |

=== Werrington North ===
Werrington North
| Party | Candidate | Votes | % | ±% |
|---|---|---|---|---|
| Werrington Ind. | John Fox* | 1,368 | 84.3 | |
| Conservative | Darren Morley | 153 | 9.4 | |
| Labour | Zayaer Malik | 102 | 6.3 | |
| Majority | | 1,215 | 74.9 | |
| Turnout | | 1,623 | 27.7 | |
| Werrington Ind. hold | | Swing | | |

=== Werrington South ===
Werrington South
| Party | Candidate | Votes | % | ±% |
|---|---|---|---|---|
| Liberal Democrats | Julia Davidson | 812 | 42.3 | |
| Conservative | Colin Burton* | 762 | 39.7 | |
| Labour | Scott Johnson | 347 | 18.1 | |
| Majority | | 50 | 2.6 | |
| Turnout | | 1,921 | 36.1 | |
| Liberal Democrats gain from Conservative | | Swing | | |

=== West ===
West
| Party | Candidate | Votes | % | ±% |
|---|---|---|---|---|
| Conservative | Yasmeen Maqbool | 1,079 | 41.7 | |
| Labour | Bedrea Laftah | 547 | 21.2 | |
| UKIP | John Myles | 499 | 19.3 | |
| Independent | April Plant | 304 | 11.8 | |
| Liberal Democrats | Beki Sellick | 156 | 6.0 | |
| Majority | | 532 | 20.6 | |
| Turnout | | 2,585 | 38.3 | |
| Conservative hold | | Swing | | |
