= 2004 Peterborough City Council election =

Local election in Peterborough, England

Results of the 2004 Peterborough City Council election

The 2004 Peterborough City Council election took place on 10 June 2004 to elect members of Peterborough City Council in England. This was on the same day as other local elections.

== Election result ==
2004 Peterborough City Council election
Party	This election			Full council			This election		
Party	Seats	Net	Seats %	Other	Total	Total %	Votes	Votes %	+/−
Conservative	33	▲3	57.9	0	33	57.9	48,328	45.7	-5.9
Independent	9	▲8	15.8	0	9	15.8	13,330	12.6	+12.3
Labour	7	▼11	12.3	0	7	12.3	26,925	25.4	-4.8
Liberal Democrats	4	Steady	7.0	0	4	7.0	11,640	11.0	-0.7
Liberal	4	▲1	7.0	0	4	7.0	5,612	5.3	-0.9
Independent Labour	0	▼1	0.0	0	0	0.0	N/A	N/A	N/A
