= 2001 Peterborough City Council election =

Local election in Peterborough, England

The 2001 Peterborough City Council election took place on 7 June 2001 to elect members of Peterborough City Council in England. This was on the same day as other local elections.

== Election result ==
2001 Peterborough City Council election
Party	This election			Full council			This election		
Party	Seats	Net	Seats %	Other	Total	Total %	Votes	Votes %	+/−
Conservative	7	▼1	36.8	20	27	47.4	23,762	40.4	-12.3
Labour	8	Steady	42.1	14	22	38.6	23,043	39.2	+5.7
Liberal Democrats	2	▲1	10.5	1	3	5.3	5,410	9.2	+2.7
Liberal	1	Steady	5.3	2	3	5.3	3,193	5.4	+1.3
Independent	1	▲1	5.3	0	1	1.8	2,977	5.1	N/A
Independent Labour	0	▼1	0.0	1	1	1.8	N/A	N/A	-2.9
UKIP	0	Steady	0.0	0	0	0.0	467	0.8	N/A
