= 2007 Peterborough City Council election =

Peterborough City Council election

Results of the 2007 Peterborough City Council election

The 2007 Peterborough City Council election took place on 3 May 2007 to elect members of Peterborough City Council in England. This was on the same day as other local elections.

== Election result ==
2007 Peterborough City Council election
Party	This election			Full council			This election		
Party	Seats	Net	Seats %	Other	Total	Total %	Votes	Votes %	+/−
Conservative	15	▲4	78.9	26	41	71.9	17,108	46.0	-1.2
Independent	2	▼1	10.5	6	8	14.0	4,240	11.4	+1.7
Liberal Democrats	0	▼1	0.0	4	4	7.0	3,288	8.8	-4.3
Liberal	1	Steady	5.3	2	3	5.3	2,134	5.7	-3.0
Labour	1	▼2	5.3	0	1	1.8	8,497	22.9	+1.6
Green	0	Steady	0.0	0	0	0.0	1,640	4.4	N/A
UKIP	0	Steady	0.0	0	0	0.0	256	0.7	N/A
