= 2016 Peterborough City Council election =

Local election in Peterborough, England

← 2015	5 May 2016	2018 →

All 60 seats to Peterborough City Council 31 seats needed for a majority
	First party	Second party	Third party
Party	Conservative	Labour	Liberal Democrats
Seats won	31	14	7
Seat change	▲4	▲2	▲3
Popular vote	46,030	37,970	7,882
Percentage	38.8%	32.0%	6.6%
Swing	▲1.5%	▲2.5%	▲3.5%
	Fourth party	Fifth party	Sixth party
Party	Werrington First	Liberal	UKIP
Seats won	3	3	2
Seat change	▲3	Steady	▼2
Popular vote	4,731	3,341	12,193
Percentage	4.0%	2.8%	10.3%
Swing	▲4.0%	▼6.0%	▼4.8%
- Map showing the results of the 2016 Peterborough City Council election
Council control before election
No Overall Control
Council control after election
Conservative Party (UK)

The 2016 Peterborough City Council election took place on 5 May 2016 to elect all members of Peterborough City Council in Cambridgeshire, England. This was on the same day as other local elections.

Following a boundary review, all Peterborough City Council seats were up for election. The number of wards reduced from 24 to 22 but the number of seats increased from 57 to 60.

The Conservatives gained overall control of Peterborough City Council after taking 31 of the 60 seats.

== Results summary ==
Peterborough City Council election, 2016
Party	Seats	Gains	Losses	Net gain/loss	Seats %	Votes %	Votes	+/−
Conservative	31	3	1	▲4		38.8	46,030	+1.5
Labour	14	2	2	▲2		32.0	37,970	+2.5
Liberal Democrats	7	0	0	▲3		6.6	7,882	+3.5
Werrington First	3	3	0	▲3		4.0	4,731	New
Liberal	3	0	0	Steady		2.8	3,341	+0.7
UKIP	2	0	0	▼2		10.3	12,193	-4.8
Green	0	0	0	Steady		4.1	4,888	-2.4
Independent	0	0	2	▼7		1.5	1,729	-4.2

Gain/loss column only indicates direct changes in seats that were contested at the last election and does not include seats picked up from newly created wards (new seat wins).

== Ward results ==
=== Barnack ===
Barnack (1 Seat)
Party	Candidate	Votes	%	±%
Conservative	David Edward Over	731	81.31	
Labour	Peter Adrian Stephen Heinrich	168	18.69	
Majority		563	62.63	
Turnout		899	36	
Conservative win				

=== Bretton ===
Bretton (3 Seats)
Party	Candidate	Votes	%	±%
Labour	Angus Alexander Ellis	916	42.6	
Labour	Stuart Martin	901	41.9	
Labour	Ann Sylvester	747	34.7	
Conservative	Jason Marc Merrill	669	31.1	
Conservative	Scott Edward Warren	656	30.5	
UKIP	Jay Beecher	652	30.3	
Conservative	Marcus Graeme Horrell	636	29.6	
Green	Wendy Hirst	252	11.7	
Liberal Democrats	Anthony Graeme Church	177	8.2	
Majority		78	3.6	
Turnout		2,155	33	
Labour win (new seat)				
Labour win (new seat)				
Labour win (new seat)				

=== Central ===
Central (3 Seats)
Party	Candidate	Votes	%	±%
Labour	Amjad Iqbal	1,814	55.6	
Labour	Mohammad Jamil	1,547	47.4	
Labour	Mahboob Hussain	1,480	45.3	
Conservative	Ishfaq Hussain	978	30.0	
Conservative	Muhammad Ikram	835	25.6	
Conservative	Stewart Edward Poole	720	22.1	
Green	Col Tingle	387	11.9	
UKIP	Jeff Lipscomb	359	11.0	
Majority		502	15.3	
Turnout		3,301	46	
Labour hold		Swing		
Labour hold		Swing		
Labour gain from Conservative		Swing		

=== Dogsthorpe ===
Dogsthorpe (3 Seats)
Party	Candidate	Votes	%	±%
Liberal	Chris Ash	1,139	49.9	
Liberal	Bella Saltmarsh	1,084	47.5	
Liberal	Keith Fredrick Sharp	955	41.8	
Labour	Jibran Khan	660	28.9	
Labour	Shaz Nawaz	633	27.7	
Labour	Haggai Odep	623	27.3	
UKIP	Peter O'Dell	362	15.9	
Conservative	Toby Ingham Abbs	203	8.9	
Conservative	Georgina Ellen Hughes	178	7.8	
Conservative	Harry James Gartside	152	6.7	
Green	Carolyn English	133	5.8	
Majority		295	12.9	
Turnout		2,293	36	
Liberal hold		Swing		
Liberal hold		Swing		
Liberal hold		Swing		

=== East ===
East (3 Seats)
Party	Candidate	Votes	%	±%
Conservative	Azher Iqbal	959	40.1	
Conservative	Marcus Neil Sims	879	36.7	
Labour	Jo Johnson	829	34.7	
Conservative	Shahnawaz Lal	820	34.3	
Labour	Nabil Ahmed Shabbir	743	31.1	
Labour	Bernadetta Mary Anyango Omondi	692	28.9	
UKIP	Graham McMillan	513	21.4	
UKIP	Massimo Antonio Pinto	374	15.6	
UKIP	Rossana Adelina Pinto	348	14.5	
Liberal	Sandra Ringler	163	6.8	
Majority		9	0.4	
Turnout		2,406	35	
Conservative hold		Swing		
Conservative gain from Labour		Swing		
Labour hold		Swing		

=== Eye, Thorney & Newborough ===
Eye, Thorney & Newborough (3 Seats)
Party	Candidate	Votes	%	±%
Conservative	David Andrew Sanders	1,299	48.9	
Conservative	Steve Allen	1,000	37.6	
Conservative	Richard Andrew Brown	869	32.7	
UKIP	Mary Herdman	812	30.5	
Independent	David Neil Harrington	764	28.7	
UKIP	Layton Mark Mills	667	25.1	
Labour	Carl Matthew Harper	496	18.7	
Green	Michael Alexander	356	13.4	
Labour	Scott Johnson	299	11.2	
Labour	Mohammed Yasin	217	8.2	
Majority		57	2.2	
Turnout		2,664	39	
Conservative hold		Swing		
Conservative hold		Swing		
Conservative hold		Swing		

=== Fletton & Stanground ===
Fletton & Stanground (3 Seats)
Party	Candidate	Votes	%	±%
Liberal Democrats	James Edward Lillis	722	34.3	
UKIP	John Whitby	691	32.8	
Labour	Alan John Clark	627	29.8	
UKIP	Andrew Monk	623	29.6	
Labour	Margaret Thulbourn	529	25.1	
Labour	Nicholas John Thulbourn	522	24.8	
Conservative	Emily Fisher	434	20.6	
Conservative	Janet Elizabeth Wilkinson	406	19.3	
Conservative	Mohammed Osaman	384	18.2	
Independent	Peter Huxley Slinger	261	12.4	
Green	Fiona Radic	237	11.3	
Majority		4	0.2	
Turnout		2,113	31	
Liberal Democrats win (new seat)				
UKIP win (new seat)				
Labour win (new seat)				

=== Fletton & Woodston ===
Fletton & Woodston (3 Seats)
Party	Candidate	Votes	%	±%
Conservative	Andy Coles	731	36.8	
Conservative	Lucia Serluca	701	35.3	
Labour	Alan Grant Dowson	682	34.3	
Labour	John Nicholas Thulbourn	635	32.0	
Conservative	Pedro Faustino	619	31.2	
Labour	Jonathan Wilde-Lyonnes	535	26.9	
Independent	Les Wheeler	369	18.6	
Independent	Dusan Obradovic	335	16.9	
Green	Richard Horton	316	15.9	
TUSC	Jon Lloyd	108	5.4	
Majority		47	2.3	
Turnout		1,994	28	
Conservative win (new seat)				
Conservative win (new seat)				
Labour win (new seat)				

=== Glinton & Castor ===
Glinton & Castor (2 Seats)
Party	Candidate	Votes	%	±%
Conservative	John Holdich	1,363	65.5	
Conservative	Peter John Hiller	1,286	61.8	
Liberal Democrats	Claire Biggam Bysshe	318	15.3	
Green	Gregor Guthrie	251	12.1	
Labour	David Hodgson	230	11.1	
Labour	Anthea Jane Sully	176	8.5	
Majority		968	46.5	
Turnout		2,096	41	
Conservative win (new seat)				
Conservative win (new seat)				

=== Gunthorpe ===
Gunthorpe (3 Seats)
Party	Candidate	Votes	%	±%
Liberal Democrats	Darren Fower	942	40.0	
Liberal Democrats	Julia Elizabeth Davidson	789	33.5	
Liberal Democrats	Andrew William Frederick Bond	769	32.7	
Conservative	Hayley Jayne Shelton	603	25.6	
Conservative	Francis Paul Murphy	575	24.4	
Conservative	Bryan Andrew Tyler	558	23.7	
UKIP	Chris Bacon	499	21.2	
UKIP	Marc Boylan-Taylor	464	19.7	
UKIP	Philip Meeds	428	18.2	
Labour	Roz Jones	364	15.5	
Labour	Joanne Louise Palmer	332	14.1	
Labour	George Welch	317	13.5	
Majority		166	7.1	
Turnout		2,364	38	
Liberal Democrats win (new seat)				
Liberal Democrats win (new seat)				
Liberal Democrats win (new seat)				

=== Hampton Vale ===
Hampton Vale (3 Seats)
Party	Candidate	Votes	%	±%
Conservative	David Antony Seaton	375	40.9	
Conservative	Dave King	338	36.9	
Conservative	Marco Cereste	296	32.3	
Labour	Ewan Robert Sully Cox	258	28.1	
Labour	Lynne Christine O'Brien	246	26.8	
Labour	Robert Stephen Thomas Walker	214	23.3	
UKIP	Teresa Josephine Linskey	195	21.3	
Green	Nick Senior	174	19.0	
Green	Jon Phillipson Brown	170	18.5	
Green	Alex Bailey	132	14.4	
Majority		38	4.2	
Turnout		920	22	
Conservative win (new seat)				
Conservative win (new seat)				
Conservative win (new seat)				

=== Hargate & Hempsted ===
Hargate & Hempsted (3 Seats)
Party	Candidate	Votes	%	±%
Conservative	Janet Violet Goodwin	301	36.6	
Conservative	Howard Anthony Fuller	289	35.1	
Conservative	Irene Walsh	255	31.0	
Liberal Democrats	Chris Wiggin	222	27.0	
Labour	George Alastair Cox	203	24.7	
Labour	Catherine Mary Weaver	193	23.5	
Labour	Ronald Clifford Graves	177	21.5	
UKIP	John Linskey	173	21.0	
UKIP	Matthew Jon Bliszczak	157	19.1	
Liberal Democrats	Daniel David Gibbs	143	17.4	
Liberal Democrats	Christian Druery Hogg	133	16.2	
UKIP	Jad Mustafa	102	12.4	
Majority		33	4.0	
Turnout		826	20	
Conservative win (new seat)				
Conservative win (new seat)				
Conservative win (new seat)				

=== North ===
North (3 Seats)
Party	Candidate	Votes	%	±%
Conservative	Mohammed Nadeem	1,482	42.4	
Labour	Ansar Ali	1,463	41.8	
Labour	Nazim Khan	1,413	40.4	
Conservative	Shazia Bashir	1,366	39.1	
Conservative	Gafoor Rehman	1,321	37.8	
Labour	Mohammed Sabir	1,211	34.6	
UKIP	Claire Alison Barks	502	14.4	
Green	Steve Wilson	332	9.5	
Liberal Democrats	Phillip Robin Whitley	279	8.0	
Majority		47	1.3	
Turnout		3,521	51	
Conservative gain from Independent				
Labour gain from Independent				
Labour win (new seat)				

=== Orton Longueville ===
Orton Longueville (3 Seats)
Party	Candidate	Votes	%	±%
Conservative	Graham Peter Casey	894	38.9	
Conservative	June Mary Bull	859	37.4	
UKIP	John Okonkowski	846	36.8	
Labour	Evelina Sidlauskiene	658	28.7	
Labour	Dennis Peter Jones	581	25.3	
Conservative	Nigel Victor North	581	25.3	
Labour	Christopher Robert York	497	21.6	
Green	Alex Airey	421	18.3	
Liberal Democrats	Vincent Richard Carroll	268	11.7	
Majority		188	8.1	
Turnout		2,309	31	
Conservative hold		Swing		
Conservative gain from Labour		Swing		
UKIP hold		Swing		

=== Orton Waterville ===
Orton Waterville (3 seats)
Party	Candidate	Votes	%	±%
Conservative	Kim Lesley Aitken	1,338	54.5	
Conservative	June Stokes	1,191	48.5	
Conservative	Gavin Anthony Elsey	1,169	47.6	
UKIP	Iain Peter McLaughlan	607	24.7	
Green	Julie Howell	565	23.0	
Labour	David Stanley Weaver	445	18.1	
Labour	Christopher James Whitworth	378	15.4	
Labour	Kim Audrey Whitworth	373	15.2	
Liberal Democrats	Rachel Ann Speed	323	13.2	
Majority		562	22.9	
Turnout		2,459	35	
Conservative hold		Swing		
Conservative hold		Swing		
Conservative hold		Swing		

=== Park ===
Park (3 Seats)
Party	Candidate	Votes	%	±%
Labour	John Francis Shearman	1,618	44.8	
Labour	Richard Ferris	1,569	43.5	
Conservative	John Philip Peach	1,546	42.8	
Conservative	Arfan Khan	1,536	42.6	
Labour	Sabra Yasin	1,343	37.2	
Conservative	Mohammad Yousaf	1,203	33.3	
Green	Ali Shah	355	9.8	
UKIP	Graham John Whitehead	348	9.6	
Liberal Democrats	Beki Sellick	163	4.5	
Majority		10	0.2	
Turnout		3,623	54	
Labour hold		Swing		
Labour hold		Swing		
Conservative hold		Swing		

=== Paston & Walton ===
Paston & Walton (3 Seats)
Party	Candidate	Votes	%	±%
Liberal Democrats	Nick Sandford	907	40.1	
Liberal Democrats	Simon Frederick Barkham	819	36.2	
Liberal Democrats	Asif Shaheed	808	35.7	
Labour	Christian DeFeo	537	23.7	
Labour	Bonita Rosalind Yonga	514	22.7	
Labour	Jonas Ambroise Hopogap Yonga	502	22.2	
Conservative	David Day	449	19.8	
UKIP	Terry Palmer	432	19.1	
Conservative	Elizabeth Jane Law	379	16.7	
UKIP	George Konstantinidis	347	15.3	
Conservative	Paul Richard McGregor	306	13.5	
Majority		271	12.0	
Turnout		2,273	31	
Liberal Democrats win (new seat)				
Liberal Democrats win (new seat)				
Liberal Democrats win (new seat)				

=== Ravensthorpe ===
Ravensthorpe (3 Seats)
Party	Candidate	Votes	%	±%
Conservative	Gul Nawaz	1,392	47.3	
Conservative	Samantha Jane Smith	1,218	41.4	
Labour	Edward Murphy	1,158	39.3	
Conservative	Mohammed Rangzeb	1,132	38.5	
Labour	Sue Johnson	1,057	35.9	
Labour	Matthew Mahabadi	898	30.5	
UKIP	Roger Hughes	598	20.3	
Majority		26	0.8	
Turnout		2,955	40	
Conservative hold				
Conservative win (new seat)				
Labour hold				

=== Stanground South ===
Stanground South (3 Seats)
Party	Candidate	Votes	%	±%
Conservative	Chris Harper	822	49.1	
Conservative	Brian Rish	777	46.4	
Conservative	Ray Bisby	762	45.5	
UKIP	Christopher Edward Mercieca	439	26.2	
Labour	Tony Otley	433	25.9	
Labour	Carole Anne Griffiths	408	24.4	
UKIP	Lisa Jane Mercieca	400	23.9	
Labour	Peter Michael Ward	355	21.2	
Majority		323	19.3	
Turnout		1,680	28	
Conservative win (new seat)				
Conservative win (new seat)				
Conservative win (new seat)				

=== Werrington ===
Werrington (3 Seats)
Party	Candidate	Votes	%	±%
Werrington First	John Raymond Fox	1,747	59.0	
Werrington First	Judy Fox	1,710	57.8	
Werrington First	Steve Lane	1,274	43.1	
UKIP	Steve Fox	565	19.1	
Conservative	Paula Vivien Thacker	452	15.3	
Conservative	Sue Day	441	14.9	
Conservative	Darren Morley	382	12.9	
Green	Roger Proudfoot	302	10.2	
Labour	Vince Moon	285	9.6	
Labour	Chris Jones	283	9.6	
Labour	Aaron Speechley	243	8.2	
Green	Cherry Beeby	238	8.0	
Green	Joseph Wells	134	4.5	
Majority		709	24.0	
Turnout		2,971	38	
Werrington First win (new seat)				
Werrington First win (new seat)				
Werrington First win (new seat)				

=== West ===
West (2 Seats)
Party	Candidate	Votes	%	±%
Conservative	Lynne Ayres	908	53.8	
Conservative	Wayne Fitzgerald	855	50.7	
Labour	Alan Gasparutti	339	20.1	
Labour	Drury Helen Thompson	304	18.0	
UKIP	John Whitson Myles	298	17.7	
UKIP	Roger Spicer	241	14.3	
Green	Debbie Goldsmith	153	9.1	
Majority		516	30.6	
Turnout		1,695	40	
Conservative hold		Swing		
Conservative hold		Swing		

=== Wittering ===
Wittering (1 Seat)
Party	Candidate	Votes	%	±%
Conservative	Diane Lamb	453	81.92	
Labour	Mahebub Juma Ladha	100	18.08	
Majority		353	63.83	
Turnout		553	25	
Conservative win (new seat)				

== By-elections ==
=== East ===
A by-election was called due to the death of Cllr Marcus Sims.

East: 8 June 2017
Party	Candidate	Votes	%	±%
Labour	Matthew Mahabadi	1,900	51.3	
Conservative	Ja Beecher	1,111	30.0	
UKIP	Graham Whitehead	358	9.7	
Liberal Democrats	Jelana Stevic	332	9.0	
Majority		789	21.3	
Turnout		3,601		
Labour gain from Conservative		Swing		

=== Park ===
A by-election was called due to the resignation of Cllr John Shearman.

Park: 17 August 2017
Party	Candidate	Votes	%	±%
Labour	Shaz Nawaz	1,713	49.6	
Conservative	Arfan Khan	1,375	39.8	
UKIP	Graham Whitehead	176	5.1	
Liberal Democrats	Ian Hardman	109	3.2	
Green	Carolyn English	83	2.4	
Majority		338	9.8	
Turnout		3,456		
Labour hold		Swing		

=== Eye, Thorney and Newborough ===
A by-election was called due to the resignation of Cllr David Sanders.

Eye, Thorney and Newborough
Party	Candidate	Votes	%	±%
Conservative	Nigel Simons	1,018	52.3	
Labour	Christian DeFeo	555	28.5	
UKIP	Mar Herdman	279	14.3	
Green	Michael Alexander	61	3.1	
Liberal Democrats	Callum Robertson	35	1.8	
Majority		463	23.8	
Turnout		1,948		
Conservative hold		Swing		
