= 1992 Peterborough City Council election =

Peterborough City Council election

← 1991	7 May 1992	1994 →

17 out of 49 seats to Peterborough City Council 25 seats needed for a majority
- Turnout: 35.6% (▼5.1%)

	First party	Second party	Third party
Party	Conservative	Labour	Liberal
Last election	19 seats, 42.5%	24 seats, 37.3%	3 seats, 8.0%
Seats won	10	5	2
Seats after	22	20	5
Seat change	▲3	▼4	▲2
Popular vote	19,102	12,628	2,317
Percentage	52.4%	34.6%	6.4%
Swing	▲9.9%	▼3.7%	▼1.6%
	Fourth party	Fifth party
Party	Liberal Democrats	Independent
Last election	2 seats, 8.0%	1 seat, 3.2%
Seats won	0	0
Seats after	1	1
Seat change	▼1	Steady
Popular vote	2,299	99
Percentage	6.3%	0.3%
Swing	▼1.7%	▼2.9%
- Winner of each seat at the 1992 Peterborough City Council election
Council control before election
No overall control
Council control after election
No overall control

The 1992 Peterborough City Council election took place on 7 May 1992 to elect members of Peterborough City Council in England. This was on the same day as other local elections.

== Summary ==
=== Election result ===
1992 Peterborough City Council election
Party	This election			Full council			This election		
Party	Seats	Net	Seats %	Other	Total	Total %	Votes	Votes %	+/−
Conservative	10	▲3	58.8	12	22	44.9	19,102	52.4	+9.9
Labour	5	▼4	29.4	15	20	40.8	12,628	34.6	-3.7
Liberal	2	▲2	11.8	3	5	10.2	2,317	6.4	-1.6
Liberal Democrats	0	▼1	0.0	1	1	2.0	2,299	6.3	-1.7
Independent	0	Steady	0.0	1	1	2.0	99	0.3	-2.9

== Ward results ==
=== Barnack ===
Barnack
Party	Candidate	Votes	%	±%
Conservative	J. West	844	85.4	+3.9
Labour	B. Keegan	144	14.6	–3.9
Majority		700	70.8	+7.7
Turnout		988	49.6	–1.9
Registered electors		1,993		
Conservative hold		Swing	▲3.9	

=== Bretton ===
Bretton
Party	Candidate	Votes	%	±%
Conservative	B. Dunham	938	52.5	+14.2
Labour	H. Lakhanpaul	759	42.5	–12.1
Liberal Democrats	D. Parekh	90	5.0	–2.1
Majority		179	10.0	N/A
Turnout		1,787	32.1	–5.3
Registered electors		5,567		
Conservative gain from Labour		Swing	▲13.2	

=== Central ===
Central (2 seats due to by-election)
Party	Candidate	Votes	%
Conservative	J. Suri*	1,004	47.0
Labour	M. Ayoub	971	45.4
Conservative	M. Tahir	933	43.6
Labour	M. Ghazanfar	921	43.1
Liberal Democrats	D. Robson	164	7.7
Turnout		2,138	42.3
Registered electors		5,055	
Conservative hold			
Labour hold			

=== Dogsthorpe ===
Dogsthorpe
Party	Candidate	Votes	%	±%
Liberal	A. Miners*	1,302	62.1	+9.8
Labour	J. Goude	410	19.5	N/A
Conservative	A. Stead	386	18.4	+0.8
Majority		892	42.6	+20.3
Turnout		2,098	33.1	–4.0
Registered electors		6,337		
Liberal gain from Liberal Democrats				

=== East ===
East
Party	Candidate	Votes	%	±%
Labour	J. Farrell*	890	50.0	–9.3
Conservative	M. Moorhouse	889	50.0	+9.3
Majority		1	0.0	–18.6
Turnout		1,779	28.0	–3.8
Registered electors		6,363		
Labour hold		Swing	▼9.3	

=== Fletton ===
Fletton
Party	Candidate	Votes	%	±%
Labour	C. Grey*	1,021	50.0	–19.2
Conservative	J. Cooke	910	44.5	+13.7
Liberal Democrats	J. Gee	113	5.5	N/A
Majority		111	5.5	–32.9
Turnout		2,044	31.6	–2.6
Registered electors		6,475		
Labour hold		Swing	▼16.5	

=== Glinton ===
Glinton
Party	Candidate	Votes	%	±%
Conservative	J. Holdich*	927	82.0	–4.7
Liberal Democrats	C. Bacon	103	9.1	N/A
Labour	M. Dale	101	8.9	–4.4
Majority		824	72.9	–0.5
Turnout		1,131	46.4	+0.9
Registered electors		2,435		
Conservative hold				

=== North ===
North
Party	Candidate	Votes	%	±%
Labour	C. Swift*	1,185	64.8	–2.7
Conservative	P. Gale	644	35.2	+2.7
Majority		541	29.6	–5.4
Turnout		1,829	37.5	–2.8
Registered electors		4,880		
Labour hold		Swing	▼2.7	

=== Orton Longueville ===
Orton Longueville
Party	Candidate	Votes	%	±%
Conservative	T. Nevett	1,514	55.0	+10.8
Labour	C. Hubback*	1,066	38.7	–6.2
Liberal Democrats	A. Yates	172	6.3	–4.7
Majority		448	16.3	N/A
Turnout		2,752	36.2	–6.6
Registered electors		7,598		
Conservative gain from Labour		Swing	▲8.5	

=== Park ===
Park
Party	Candidate	Votes	%	±%
Conservative	M. Kreling	1,715	63.8	+9.6
Labour	M. Beaver	544	20.2	–4.9
Liberal Democrats	A. Woodford	252	9.4	N/A
Liberal	R. Keyes	177	6.6	–14.1
Majority		1,171	43.6	+14.1
Turnout		2,688	41.6	–9.8
Registered electors		6,459		
Conservative hold		Swing	▲7.3	

=== Paston ===
Paston
Party	Candidate	Votes	%	±%
Labour	S. Dalgarno*	768	49.8	–7.6
Conservative	M. Butler	580	37.6	+19.9
Liberal	S. Wiggin	99	6.4	–15.5
Liberal Democrats	T. Smith	96	6.2	N/A
Majority		188	12.2	–23.3
Turnout		1,543	32.8	–10.9
Registered electors		4,705		
Labour hold		Swing	▼13.8	

=== Ravensthorpe ===
Ravensthorpe
Party	Candidate	Votes	%	±%
Liberal	P. Wiggin	689	41.7	–9.2
Labour	J. Hall	686	41.5	+2.7
Conservative	B. Dirikis-Kew	279	16.9	+6.7
Majority		3	0.2	–11.9
Turnout		1,654	28.1	–6.1
Registered electors		5,877		
Liberal gain from Labour		Swing	▼6.0	

=== Stanground ===
Stanground
Party	Candidate	Votes	%	±%
Conservative	G. Simons*	1,581	56.7	+5.5
Labour	M. Todd	1,089	39.0	–1.7
Liberal Democrats	S. Crowe	119	4.3	–3.7
Majority		492	17.7	+7.2
Turnout		2,789	42.2	–4.8
Registered electors		6,607		
Conservative hold		Swing	▲3.6	

=== Walton ===
Walton
Party	Candidate	Votes	%	±%
Conservative	D. Porteious	893	43.2	–1.3
Labour	C. Caborn*	551	26.7	+3.2
Liberal Democrats	A. Taylor	524	25.4	–6.6
Independent	A. Hornsby	99	4.8	N/A
Majority		342	16.5	+4.0
Turnout		2,067	37.6	–9.9
Registered electors		5,496		
Conservative gain from Labour		Swing	▼2.3	

=== Werrington ===
Werrington
Party	Candidate	Votes	%	±%
Conservative	R. Burke*	2,367	67.4	+5.5
Labour	P. Clements	743	21.2	–2.5
Liberal Democrats	N. Phillips	401	11.4	–3.1
Majority		1,624	46.3	+8.1
Turnout		3,511	31.2	+3.1
Registered electors		11,241		
Conservative hold		Swing	▲4.0	

=== West ===
West
Party	Candidate	Votes	%	±%
Conservative	G. Ridgway*	2,698	71.1	+12.8
Labour	P. Ward	779	20.5	–8.3
Liberal Democrats	J. Sandford	265	7.0	–5.9
Liberal	N. Hughes	50	1.3	N/A
Majority		1,919	50.6	+21.1
Turnout		3,792	37.2	–3.6
Registered electors		10,190		
Conservative hold		Swing	▲10.6	
