= 1996 Peterborough City Council election =

Local election in Peterborough, England

← 1995	2 May 1996	1997 →

16 out of 49 seats to Peterborough City Council 25 seats needed for a majority

	First party	Second party	Third party
Party	Labour	Conservative	Liberal
Last election	24 seats, 52.3%	19 seats, 31.6%	4 seats, 6.1%
Seats won	10	4	1
Seats after	29	13	3
Seat change	▲5	▼6	▼1
Popular vote	16,191	10,952	1,809
Percentage	49.4%	33.4%	5.5%
Swing	▼2.9%	▲1.8%	▼0.6%
	Fourth party	Fifth party
Party	Liberal Democrats	Independent
Last election	1 seat, 7.7%	1 seat, 1.2%
Seats won	1	1
Seats after	2	2
Seat change	▲1	▲1
Popular vote	2,832	1,013
Percentage	8.6%	3.1%
Swing	▲0.9%	▲1.9%
- Winner of each seat at the 1996 Peterborough City Council election
Council control before election
No overall control
Council control after election
Labour

The 1996 Peterborough City Council election took place on 2 May 1996 to elect members of Peterborough City Council in England. This was on the same day as other local elections.

== Election result ==
1996 Peterborough City Council election
Party	This election			Full council			This election		
Party	Seats	Net	Seats %	Other	Total	Total %	Votes	Votes %	+/−
Labour	10	▲5	58.8	19	29	59.2	16,191	49.4	-2.9
Conservative	4	▼6	23.5	9	13	26.5	10,952	33.4	+1.8
Liberal	1	▼1	5.9	2	3	6.1	1,809	5.5	-0.6
Liberal Democrats	1	▲1	5.9	1	2	4.1	2,832	8.6	+0.9
Independent	1	▲1	5.9	1	2	4.1	1,013	3.1	+1.9

== Ward results ==
=== Barnack ===
Barnack
Party	Candidate	Votes	%	±%
Conservative	D. Over	554	58.6	–26.8
Labour	M. Beaver	239	25.3	+10.7
Liberal Democrats	E. Bishop	153	16.2	N/A
Majority		315	33.3	–37.6
Turnout		946	48.0	–1.6
Conservative hold		Swing	▼18.8	

=== Bretton ===
Bretton
Party	Candidate	Votes	%	±%
Labour	D. Weston	1,077	71.8	+6.2
Conservative	B. Dunham*	317	21.1	–4.3
Liberal Democrats	K. Scott	106	7.1	–1.9
Majority		760	50.7	+10.6
Turnout		1,500	29.9	–0.2
Labour gain from Conservative		Swing	▲5.3	

=== Central ===
Central
Party	Candidate	Votes	%	±%
Labour	N. Khan	1,353	58.9	+5.8
Conservative	M. Hussain	945	41.1	–5.8
Majority		408	17.8	+11.6
Turnout		2,298	50.8	–3.4
Labour gain from Conservative		Swing	▲5.8	

=== Dogsthorpe ===
Dogsthorpe
Party	Candidate	Votes	%	±%
Liberal	A. Miners*	1,188	63.8	+12.6
Labour	W. Haughton	506	27.2	–11.0
Conservative	J. Hunter	169	9.1	–1.5
Majority		682	36.6	+23.6
Turnout		1,863	33.0	+1.9
Liberal hold		Swing	▲11.8	

=== East ===
East
Party	Candidate	Votes	%	±%
Labour	J. Farrell*	1,157	65.6	+10.6
Conservative	P. Grimwood	498	28.2	–11.1
Liberal Democrats	S. Watkin	109	6.2	N/A
Majority		659	37.4	+21.7
Turnout		1,764	28.0	–8.8
Labour hold		Swing	▲10.9	

=== Fletton ===
Fletton
Party	Candidate	Votes	%	±%
Labour	C. Gray*	1,258	77.1	–1.6
Conservative	D. Hillson	373	22.9	+1.6
Majority		885	54.3	–3.2
Turnout		1,631	25.5	–1.6
Labour hold		Swing	▼1.6	

=== Glinton ===
Glinton
Party	Candidate	Votes	%	±%
Conservative	J. Holdich*	726	63.8	–18.2
Labour	M. Dale	208	18.3	+9.4
Liberal Democrats	A. Ewing	204	17.9	+8.8
Majority		518	45.5	–27.4
Turnout		1,138	45.5	–0.9
Conservative hold		Swing	▼13.8	

=== North ===
North
Party	Candidate	Votes	%	±%
Independent	C. Swift*	1,013	52.4	N/A
Labour	W. Easton	618	32.0	–41.9
Conservative	D. Raines	218	11.3	–0.7
Liberal Democrats	L. Martin	50	2.6	–4.5
Liberal	D. Robson	35	1.8	–5.2
Majority		395	20.4	N/A
Turnout		1,934	41.6	+7.6
Independent gain from Labour				

=== Orton Longueville ===
Orton Longueville
Party	Candidate	Votes	%	±%
Labour	J. Owens	1,268	54.6	–8.0
Conservative	T. Nevett*	695	29.9	+3.0
Liberal Democrats	A. Ewing	360	15.5	+6.4
Majority		573	24.7	–11.0
Turnout		2,323	31.1	–1.9
Labour gain from Conservative		Swing	▼5.5	

=== Park ===
Park
Party	Candidate	Votes	%	±%
Conservative	P. Kreling*	1,144	52.4	+19.8
Labour	C. Hubback	1,041	47.6	+5.8
Majority		103	4.7	N/A
Turnout		2,185	33.0	–4.2
Conservative hold		Swing	▲7.0	

=== Paston ===
Paston (2 seats due to by-election)
Party	Candidate	Votes	%
Labour	S. Bradley	644	64.3
Labour	P. Ward	510	50.9
Conservative	C. Porteious	180	18.0
Conservative	M. Sims	153	15.3
Liberal	R. Keyes	135	13.5
Liberal	P. Shaw	102	10.2
Turnout		1,001	22.1
Labour hold			
Labour hold			

=== Ravensthorpe ===
Ravensthorpe
Party	Candidate	Votes	%	±%
Labour	J. Ledgister	1,098	69.4	+6.4
Liberal	S. McGee	349	22.1	–14.9
Conservative	A. Semper	134	8.5	N/A
Majority		749	47.4	+21.3
Turnout		1,581	31.6	–4.3
Labour gain from Liberal		Swing	▲10.7	

=== Stanground ===
Stanground
Party	Candidate	Votes	%	±%
Labour	P. Bonner	1,346	52.6	–6.6
Conservative	G. Simons*	1,028	40.2	+5.2
Liberal Democrats	S. Crowe	184	7.2	+1.5
Majority		318	12.4	–11.8
Turnout		2,558	39.1	–1.6
Labour gain from Conservative		Swing	▼5.9	

=== Walton ===
Walton
Party	Candidate	Votes	%	±%
Liberal Democrats	J. Sandford	846	38.9	+7.5
Labour	K. Bleakney	800	36.8	+2.7
Conservative	D. Porteious*	528	24.3	–10.2
Majority		46	2.1	N/A
Turnout		2,174	42.9	±0.0
Liberal Democrats gain from Conservative		Swing	▲2.4	

=== Werrington ===
Werrington
Party	Candidate	Votes	%	±%
Labour	P. Clements	1,522	46.8	+14.8
Conservative	R. Burke*	1,306	40.1	–1.8
Liberal Democrats	G. Bishop	426	13.1	–13.1
Majority		216	6.6	N/A
Turnout		3,254	29.3	–3.4
Labour gain from Conservative		Swing	▲8.3	

=== West ===
West
Party	Candidate	Votes	%	±%
Conservative	G. Ridgway*	1,984	50.6	+6.4
Labour	A. Ellis	1,546	39.4	–4.8
Liberal Democrats	P. King	394	10.0	–1.6
Majority		438	11.2	N/A
Turnout		3,924	39.1	+2.3
Conservative hold		Swing	▲5.6	
