= 2014 Peterborough City Council election =

Local election in Peterborough, England

- 22 May 2014

All 60 seats to Peterborough City Council 31 seats needed for a majority
	First party	Second party	Third party
Party	Conservative	Labour	Liberal Democrats
	Fourth party	Fifth party	Sixth party
Party	Werrington First	Liberal	UKIP
- Results of the 2014 Peterborough City Council election
Council control after election
TBD

The 2014 Peterborough City Council election took place on 22 May 2014 to elect members of Peterborough City Council in England. This was on the same day as other local elections.

The Conservatives lost four seats to give them a total of 28 seats, Labour gained one seat to give them a total of 12 seats, UK Independence Party won three seats, the Independents maintained seven seats, the Liberal Democrats maintained four seats and the Liberal Party maintained three seats.

== Election result ==
2014 Peterborough City Council election
Party	This election			Full council			This election		
Party	Seats	Net	Seats %	Other	Total	Total %	Votes	Votes %	+/−
Conservative	10	▼4	47.6	21	31	54.4	15,392	33.2	-7.6
Labour	2	▲1	9.5	9	11	19.3	13,466	29.0	-3.7
Independent	3	Steady	14.3	1	4	7.0	3,476	7.5	+3.2
UKIP	3	▲3	14.3	0	3	5.3	7,502	16.2	+10.5
Liberal Democrats	2	Steady	9.5	1	3	5.3	2,686	5.8	+0.1
Liberal	1	Steady	4.8	2	3	5.3	1,404	3.0	+0.2
Werrington Ind.	0	Steady	0.0	2	2	3.5	N/A	N/A	N/A
Green	0	Steady	0.0	0	0	0.0	1,553	3.3	+1.1
English Democrat	0	Steady	0.0	0	0	0.0	610	1.3	+0.6
TUSC	0	Steady	0.0	0	0	0.0	342	0.7	+0.4

== Ward results ==
=== Bretton North ===
Bretton North
Party	Candidate	Votes	%	±%
UKIP	Michael Herdman	782	35.6	+20.5
Labour	Evelina Sid	700	31.9	−0.8
Conservative	Jason Merrill	520	23.7	+0.3
Liberal Democrats	Malcolm Pollack	195	8.9	+4.3
Majority		82	3.7	
Turnout		2,197		
UKIP gain from Conservative		Swing	▲10.7	

=== Central ===
Central
Party	Candidate	Votes	%	±%
Labour	Mohammed Jamil	2,044	64.9	+14.1
Conservative	Mohammed Younis	785	24.9	−19.4
Green	Karen Lawrence	320	10.2	+5.3
Majority		1,259	40.0	
Turnout		3,149		
Labour hold		Swing	▲16.8	

=== Dogsthorpe ===
Dogsthorpe
Party	Candidate	Votes	%	±%
Liberal	Chris Ash	1,194	58.8	−1.3
Labour	Kevin Bell	610	30.0	+5.1
Conservative	Samantha Dalton	228	11.2	+4.1
Majority		584	28.8	
Turnout		2,032		
Liberal hold		Swing	▼3.2	

=== East ===
East
Party	Candidate	Votes	%	±%
Conservative	Azher Iqbal	991	36.0	+2.5
Labour	Sue Johnson	805	29.2	−18.7
UKIP	Simon Ewing	614	22.3	N/A
Liberal	Sandra Ringler	210	7.6	N/A
Green	Ben Middleton	133	4.8	−6.5
Majority		186	6.8	
Turnout		2,753		
Conservative hold		Swing	▲10.6	

=== Eye and Thorney ===
Eye and Thorney (2 seats due to by-election)
Party	Candidate	Votes	%	±%
Conservative	David Sanders	1,008	60.3	
Conservative	Richard Brown	773	46.2	
UKIP	Mary Herdman	763	45.6	
Labour	Marc Boylan	327	19.5	
Labour	Haggai Odep	213	12.7	
Green	Fiona Radic	180	10.8	
TUSC	Carl Harper	81	4.8	
Turnout		1,673		
Conservative hold				
Conservative hold				

=== Fletton and Woodston ===
Fletton and Woodston
Party	Candidate	Votes	%	±%
Conservative	Lucia Serluca	739	30.9	+1.4
Labour	Margaret Thulbourn	699	29.2	−13.0
UKIP	Kevin Morris	591	24.7	N/A
Green	Ian Tennant	165	6.9	−3.4
Independent	Angela Brennan	157	6.6	N/A
TUSC	Jon Lloyd	39	1.6	N/A
Majority		40	1.7	
Turnout		2,390		
Conservative hold		Swing	▲7.2	

=== Glinton and Wittering ===
Glinton and Wittering
Party	Candidate	Votes	%	±%
Conservative	Diane Lamb	829	44.2	−37.1
UKIP	Robin Talbot	464	24.7	N/A
Independent	Alex Terry	379	20.2	N/A
Labour	Peter O'Connor	205	10.9	−7.8
Majority		365	19.5	
Turnout		1,877		
Conservative hold		Swing	N/A	

=== Newborough ===
Newborough
Party	Candidate	Votes	%	±%
Independent	David Harrington	570	61.5	+14.7
Conservative	Ray Dobbs	263	28.4	−14.7
Labour	Bonita Yonga	94	10.1	±0.0
Majority		307	33.1	
Turnout		927		
Independent hold		Swing	▲14.7	

=== North ===
North
Party	Candidate	Votes	%	±%
Independent	Keith Sharp	857	63.2	−9.7
Labour	Jonas Yonga	372	27.4	+10.4
Conservative	Harry Gartside	128	9.4	−0.7
Majority		485	35.8	
Turnout		1,357		
Independent hold		Swing	▼10.1	

=== Orton Longueville ===
Orton Longueville
Party	Candidate	Votes	%	±%
UKIP	John Okonowski	755	31.7	+16.6
Conservative	Janet Goodwin	715	30.0	−2.0
Labour	Angus Ellis	672	28.2	−19.2
Green	Michelle Cooper	144	6.0	N/A
TUSC	Mary Cooke	99	4.2	−1.3
Majority		40	1.7	
Turnout		2,385		
UKIP gain from Conservative		Swing	▲9.3	

=== Orton Waterville ===
Orton Waterville
Party	Candidate	Votes	%	±%
Conservative	June Stokes	1,169	45.5	−10.0
UKIP	Iain McLaughlan	780	30.3	+10.5
Labour	Peter Heinrich	373	14.5	−10.2
Green	Sarah Wilkinson	206	8.0	N/A
TUSC	Steve Cawley	44	1.7	N/A
Majority		389	15.2	
Turnout		2,572		
Conservative hold		Swing	▼10.3	

=== Orton with Hampton ===
Orton with Hampton
Party	Candidate	Votes	%	±%
Conservative	Sheila Scott	937	37.6	−9.3
Labour	Alan Dowson	636	25.5	−0.7
Independent	Teri Starr	368	14.8	N/A
Green	Darren Bisby-Boyd	284	11.4	N/A
Liberal Democrats	Christopher Wiggin	267	10.7	+2.3
Majority		301	12.1	
Turnout		2,492		
Conservative hold		Swing	▼4.3	

=== Park ===
Park
Party	Candidate	Votes	%	±%
Labour	Richard Ferris	1,410	45.6	+2.2
Conservative	Steve Allan	1,191	38.5	−13.2
UKIP	Rupert Dexter	283	9.2	N/A
Green	Rich Hill	121	3.9	−1.1
Liberal Democrats	Beki Sellick	74	2.4	N/A
TUSC	Geoffrey Eagle	12	0.4	N/A
Majority		219	7.1	
Turnout		3,091		
Labour gain from Conservative		Swing	▲7.7	

=== Paston ===
Paston
Party	Candidate	Votes	%	±%
UKIP	Frances Fox	752	41.0	N/A
Labour	Nicola Day	641	34.9	−15.4
Conservative	June Bull	443	24.1	−25.6
Majority		111	6.1	
Turnout		1,836		
UKIP gain from Conservative		Swing	N/A	

=== Stanground Central ===
Stanground Central
Party	Candidate	Votes	%	±%
Conservative	Brian Rush	957	40.2	+1.2
Labour	Chris York	811	34.1	−4.0
English Democrat	Nick Capp	610	25.7	+11.1
Majority		146	6.1	
Turnout		2,378		
Conservative hold		Swing	▲2.6	

=== Walton ===
Walton
Party	Candidate	Votes	%	±%
Liberal Democrats	Asif Shaheed	617	40.2	−17.6
UKIP	Mick Kennedy	495	32.2	N/A
Conservative	Paul McGregor	228	14.9	−8.1
Labour	Nyasha Banhire	195	12.7	−6.5
Majority		122	8.0	
Turnout		1,535		
Liberal Democrats hold		Swing	N/A	

=== Werrington North ===
Werrington North
Party	Candidate	Votes	%	±%
Independent	Stephen Lane	1,145	60.7	N/A
Conservative	Howard Fuller	362	19.2	+9.8
Labour	Roz Jones	242	12.8	+6.5
Liberal Democrats	Andrew Bond	69	3.7	N/A
TUSC	Mark Cooke	67	3.6	N/A
Majority		783	41.5	
Turnout		1,885		
Independent hold		Swing	N/A	

=== Werrington South ===
Werrington South
Party	Candidate	Votes	%	±%
Liberal Democrats	Darren Fower	1,174	48.6	+6.3
UKIP	June Kennedy	521	21.6	N/A
Conservative	Darren Morley	491	20.3	−19.4
Labour	Vince Moon	230	9.5	−8.6
Majority		653	27.0	
Turnout		2,416		
Liberal Democrats hold		Swing	N/A	

=== West ===
West (2 seats due to by-election)
Party	Candidate	Votes	%	±%
Conservative	Nick Arculus	1,482	51.0	
Conservative	Wayne Fitzgerald	1,153	39.7	
Labour	Mohammed Sabir	1,137	39.1	
Labour	Darrell Goodliffe	1,050	36.1	
UKIP	John Myles	702	24.1	
Liberal Democrats	Peter Chivall	290	10.0	
Turnout		2,907		
Conservative hold				
Conservative hold				
