= 2000 Peterborough City Council election =

Local election in Peterborough, England

The 2000 Peterborough City Council election took place on 4 May 2000 to elect members of Peterborough City Council in England. This was on the same day as other local elections.

== Election results ==
2000 Peterborough City Council election
Party	This election			Full council			This election		
Party	Seats	Net	Seats %	Other	Total	Total %	Votes	Votes %	+/−
Conservative	9	▲3	45.0	19	28	49.1	15,822	52.7	+0.1
Labour	7	▼4	35.0	15	22	38.6	10,044	33.5	-7.8
Liberal	1	Steady	5.0	2	3	5.3	1,230	4.1	-0.2
Liberal Democrats	2	Steady	10.0	0	2	3.5	1,963	6.5	+5.5
Independent Labour	1	▲1	5.0	1	2	3.5	877	2.9	N/A
Legalise Cannabis	0	Steady	0.0	0	0	0.0	85	0.3	N/A

== Ward results ==
=== Barnack ===
Barnack
Party	Candidate	Votes	%	±%
Conservative	D. Over*	671	84.5	
Labour	G. Jackson	123	15.5	
Majority		548	69.0	
Turnout		794	41.9	
Conservative hold		Swing		

=== Central ===
Central
Party	Candidate	Votes	%	±%
Labour	R. Akhtar*	1,478	54.7	
Conservative	M. Hussain	1,224	45.3	
Majority		254	9.4	
Turnout		2,702	48.4	
Labour hold		Swing		

=== Dogsthorpe ===
Dogsthorpe
Party	Candidate	Votes	%	±%
Liberal	C. Ash	902	63.8	
Labour	C. Hubback	256	18.1	
Conservative	P. Gale	256	18.1	
Majority		646	45.7	
Turnout		1,414	26.2	
Liberal hold		Swing		

=== East ===
East
Party	Candidate	Votes	%	±%
Conservative	M. Collins	893	59.8	
Labour	C. Edwards*	516	34.5	
Legalise Cannabis	M. Davies	85	5.7	
Majority		377	25.2	
Turnout		1,494	28.2	
Conservative gain from Labour		Swing		

=== Fletton ===
Fletton
Party	Candidate	Votes	%	±%
Labour	M. Farrell*	605	50.9	
Conservative	A. Vigar	584	49.1	
Majority		21	1.8	
Turnout		1,189	21.8	
Labour hold		Swing		

=== North ===
North
Party	Candidate	Votes	%	±%
Independent Labour	K. Sharp	877	69.4	
Conservative	A. Stead	227	18.0	
Labour	J. Washington	159	12.6	
Majority		650	51.5	
Turnout		1,263	33.1	
Independent Labour gain from Labour		Swing		

=== North Bretton ===
North Bretton
Party	Candidate	Votes	%	±%
Labour	J. Johnson*	702	61.1	
Conservative	S. Scott	447	38.9	
Majority		255	22.2	
Turnout		1,149	20.7	
Labour hold		Swing		

=== Orton Longueville ===
Orton Longueville
Party	Candidate	Votes	%	±%
Labour	C. Weaver*	772	47.4	
Conservative	G. Murphy	707	43.5	
Liberal	A. Clarke	148	9.1	
Majority		65	4.0	
Turnout		1,627	28.3	
Labour hold		Swing		

=== Orton Waterville ===
Orton Waterville
Party	Candidate	Votes	%	±%
Conservative	A. Kempsell*	1,444	76.2	
Labour	K. Whitworth	452	23.8	
Majority		992	52.3	
Turnout		1,896	30.7	
Conservative hold		Swing		

=== Park ===
Park
Party	Candidate	Votes	%	±%
Conservative	J. Peach*	1,833	76.1	
Labour	M. Hussain	422	17.5	
Liberal Democrats	C. Spencer	154	6.4	
Majority		1,411	58.6	
Turnout		2,409	40.3	
Conservative hold		Swing		

=== Paston ===
Paston
Party	Candidate	Votes	%	±%
Labour	J. Bleakney*	507	47.8	
Conservative	K. Jarvie	366	34.5	
Liberal	C. Walker	187	17.6	
Majority		141	13.3	
Turnout		1,060	19.8	
Labour hold		Swing		

=== Ravensthorpe ===
Ravensthorpe
Party	Candidate	Votes	%	±%
Labour	L. O'Brien	638	54.2	
Conservative	H. Newton	398	33.8	
Liberal	D. Robson	141	12.0	
Majority		240	20.4	
Turnout		1,177	22.5	
Labour hold		Swing		

=== South ===
South
Party	Candidate	Votes	%	±%
Labour	M. Dale*	421	54.2	
Conservative	L. Serluca	356	45.8	
Majority		65	8.4	
Turnout		777	30.5	
Labour hold		Swing		

=== South Bretton ===
South Bretton
Party	Candidate	Votes	%	±%
Conservative	E. Law	823	61.2	
Labour	A. Ellis*	521	38.8	
Majority		302	22.5	
Turnout		1,344	32.9	
Conservative gain from Labour		Swing		

=== Stanground ===
Stanground
Party	Candidate	Votes	%	±%
Conservative	B. Rush	992	52.5	
Labour	R. Palmer*	899	47.5	
Majority		93	4.9	
Turnout		1,891	33.6	
Conservative gain from Labour		Swing		

=== Walton ===
Walton (2 seats due to by-election)
Party	Candidate	Votes	%	±%
Liberal Democrats	J. Sandford*	943	65.9	
Liberal Democrats	D. Fower	866	60.5	
Conservative	J. Roberts	402	28.1	
Conservative	R. Allen	305	21.3	
Labour	W. Burke	147	10.3	
Labour	Z. Bishrey	126	8.8	
Turnout		1,432	37.0	
Liberal Democrats hold				
Liberal Democrats hold				

=== Werrington North ===
Werrington North
Party	Candidate	Votes	%	±%
Conservative	T. Hitchborn	834	62.2	
Labour	M. Jamil	506	37.8	
Majority		328	24.5	
Turnout		1,340	25.4	
Conservative hold		Swing		

=== Werrington South ===
Werrington South
Party	Candidate	Votes	%	±%
Conservative	D. Raines*	1,287	77.2	
Labour	C. Fisher	380	22.8	
Majority		907	54.4	
Turnout		1,667	30.7	
Conservative hold		Swing		

=== West ===
West
Party	Candidate	Votes	%	±%
Conservative	G. Ridgway*	1,773	81.1	
Labour	A. Pears	414	18.9	
Majority		1,359	62.1	
Turnout		2,187	39.1	
Conservative hold		Swing		
