= 2023 Peterborough City Council election =

Local election in Peterborough, England

- 4 May 2023

21 out of 60 seats to Peterborough City Council 31 seats needed for a majority
	First party	Second party	Third party
Leader	Wayne Fitzgerald	Dennis Jones	Christian Hogg
Party	Conservative	Labour	Liberal Democrats
Leader's seat	West	Dogsthorpe	Fletton & Stanground
Last election	28 seats, 35.8%	17 seats, 34.8%	8 seats, 13.4%
Seats before	28	14	8
Seats won	8	6	4
Seats after	30	14	8
Seat change	▲2	Steady	Steady
Popular vote	15,792	14,278	5,139
Percentage	35.5%	32.1%	11.6%
Swing	▼0.3%	▼2.7%	▼1.8%
	Fourth party	Fifth party	Sixth party
Leader	Chris Harper	Nicola Day	Julie Stevenson
Party	Peterborough First	Green	Independent
Leader's seat	Stanground South	Orton Waterville	Orton Waterville
Last election	3 seats, 3.5% (Note: Result for Werrington First.)	3 seats, 9.3%	1 seat, 0.6%
Seats before	4	4	2
Seats won	1	2	0
Seats after	4	3	1
Seat change	Steady	▼1	▼1
Popular vote	1,672	6,282	1,101
Percentage	3.8%	14.1%	2.5%
Swing	▲0.3%	▲4.8%	▲1.9%
- Winner of each seat at the 2023 Peterborough City Council election.
Leader before election
Wayne Fitzgerald
Conservative
No overall control
Leader after election
Wayne Fitzgerald
Conservative
No overall control

The 2023 Peterborough City Council election took place on 4 May 2023 to elect members of Peterborough City Council in Cambridgeshire, England. There were 21 of the 60 seats on the council contested. The election took place alongside other local elections across England.

The council remained under no overall control, being led by a Conservative minority administration.

== Overview ==
Going into the election, the position of the parties and the number of seats they were defending was:

- Conservative: 6 defences (22 other seats)
- Labour (and Co-operative): 6 defences (6 other seats)
- Liberal Democrat: 4 defences (4 other seats)
- Green: 3 defences (1 other seat)
- Werrington / Peterborough First: 1 defence (3 other seats)
- Independent: 1 defence (1 other seat)

Immediately after the election the position was that the Conservatives had 30 seats, Labour 14, the Liberal Democrats 5, Green 3 and there were 5 independents / Peterborough First.

Two weeks after the elections took place, four councillors, Brian Rush (Stanground South), Peter Hiller (Glinton & Castor), Ray Bisby (Stanground South) and Gavin Elsey (Wittering), left the Conservative Party to join Peterborough First.

In June 2023, after an initial suspension, Councillor Mohammed Farooq (Hargate & Hempsted) quit the Conservative Party, citing a "bullying, toxic culture. He was followed soon after by his son, Councillor Saqib Farooq (Glinton & Castor) and ward-colleague Councillor John Howard.

== Election result ==
2023 Peterborough City Council election
Party	This election				Full council			This election		
Party	Candidates	Seats	Net	Seats %	Other	Total	Total %	Votes	Votes %	+/−
Conservative	21	8	▲2	38.1	22	30	50.0	15,792	35.5	–0.3
Labour	21	6	Steady	28.6	8	14	23.3	14,278	32.1	–2.7
Liberal Democrats	17	4	Steady	19.0	4	8	13.3	5,139	11.6	–1.8
Peterborough First	1	1	Steady	4.8	3	4	6.7	1,672	3.8	+0.3
Green	19	2	▼1	9.5	1	3	5.0	6,282	14.1	+4.8
Independent	4	0	▼1	0.0	1	1	1.7	1,101	2.5	+1.9
Reform	1	0	Steady	0.0	0	0	0.0	80	0.2	–0.5
TUSC	1	0	Steady	0.0	0	0	0.0	73	0.2	+0.1
CPA	1	0	Steady	0.0	0	0	0.0	54	0.1	N/A

== Ward results ==
Asterisks denote incumbent councillors seeking re-election. Unless otherwise noted, the councillors seeking re-election were elected in 2019; changes in vote share are therefore compared to the 2019 election.

=== Bretton ===
UKIP (16.7%) did not contest this election.

Bretton ward
Party	Candidate	Votes	%	±%
Labour	Richard James Strangward	863	44.5	▲9.9
Conservative	Chris Burbage*	785	40.4	▲4.8
Liberal Democrats	Rohan Cameron Stuart Wilson	133	6.9	▼0.5
Green	Barry Warne	81	4.2	▼1.5
Independent	John O'Connor	79	4.1	NEW
Majority		78	4.0	
Turnout		1,941	29.1	▼0.8
Labour gain from Conservative		Swing	Steady	

=== Central ===
UKIP (5.1%) did not contest this election.

Central ward
Party	Candidate	Votes	%	±%
Labour Co-op	Mohammed Jamil*	1,579	62.1	▲6.7
Conservative	Umar Khan	509	20.0	▼6.9
Green	Raymond Knight	203	8.0	▲1.3
Liberal Democrats	Paul Michael Whittaker	179	7.0	▲1.1
TUSC	Steve Cawley	73	2.9	NEW
Majority		1,070	42.1	▲13.6
Turnout		2,543	29.8	▼10.9
Labour Co-op hold		Swing	Steady	

=== Dogsthorpe ===
Independent Colin Hargreaves (10.7%) and the Veterans and People's Party (5.1%) did not contest this election.

The incumbent, Katia Yurgutene (Labour Co-op) did not seek re-election.

Dogsthorpe ward
Party	Candidate	Votes	%	±%
Labour Co-op	Katy Jane Cole	902	47.4	▲9.9
Conservative	Muhammad Ikram	654	34.3	▲26.2
Liberal Democrats	Sandra Ringler	152	8.0	▼26.4
Green	Kelsey Jack Brace	99	5.2	
Independent	Robert Bede Petch	97	5.1	NEW
Majority		248	13.0	▲9.9
Turnout		1,904	28.2	▼0.8
Labour Co-op hold		Swing	Steady	

=== East ===
The Liberal Democrats (9.7%) did not contest this election.

East ward
Party	Candidate	Votes	%	±%
Labour Co-op	Shabina Asad Qayyum*	1,618	65.6	▲17.3
Conservative	Ekta Patel	665	27.0	▼6.9
Green	Luke Chapman	120	4.9	▼3.2
Independent	Jo Johnson	62	2.5	NEW
Majority		953	38.7	▲24.3
Turnout		2,465	33.9	▲1.5
Labour Co-op hold		Swing	Steady	

=== Eye, Thorney and Newborough ===
UKIP (14.8%) and SDP (7.9%) did not contest this election.

Eye, Thorney & Newborough ward
Party	Candidate	Votes	%	±%
Conservative	Steve Allen*	1,122	54.3	▲1.5
Labour	John Shearman	587	28.4	▲14.7
Green	Michael Alexander	244	11.8	▲4.6
Liberal Democrats	Annie Rose Francis Mary Geraghty	115	5.6	▲2.1
Majority		535	25.9	▼12.1
Turnout		2,068	28.1	▼5.1
Conservative hold		Swing	Steady	

=== Fletton and Stanground ===
UKIP (16%) did not contest this election.

The incumbent, Jade Seager, was elected in 2022.

Fletton & Stanground ward
Party	Candidate	Votes	%	±%
Liberal Democrats	Jade Seager*	874	48.5	▼3.2
Conservative	Davide Broccoli	434	24.1	▲11.8
Labour	Angus Ellis	348	19.3	▲6.3
Green	Danette Lisa O'Hara	145	8.1	▲1.1
Majority		440	24.4	▼11.3
Turnout		1,801	24.9	▼3.5
Liberal Democrats hold		Swing	Steady	

=== Fletton and Woodston ===
UKIP (16%) and Our Nation (1.7%) did not contest this election.

The incumbent was Imtiaz Ali who had defected to the Green Party from Labour.

Fletton & Woodston ward
Party	Candidate	Votes	%	±%
Labour Co-op	Nick Thulbourn	732	37.4	▲7.1
Conservative	Andrew Stephen Willey	720	36.8	▲2.9
Green	Imtiaz Ali*	406	20.8	▲10.0
Liberal Democrats	Neil Christopher Walton	98	5.0	▼2.9
Majority		12	0.6	
Turnout		1,956	26.2	▼0.6
Labour Co-op hold		Swing	Steady	

=== Glinton and Castor ===
Hiller defected from the Conservatives to Peterborough First less than two weeks after being re-elected.

Glinton & Castor ward
Party	Candidate	Votes	%	±%
Conservative	Peter John Hiller*	1,088	59.8	▼6.9
Labour	Sue Farr	278	15.3	▲6.0
Liberal Democrats	Claire Biggam Bysshe	270	14.8	▲2.1
Green	Greg Guthrie	183	10.1	▼1.1
Majority		810	44.5	▼9.5
Turnout		1,819	35.9	▼2.6
Conservative hold		Swing	Steady	

=== Gunthorpe ===
UKIP (9.3%) and the Green Party (3.6%) did not contest this election.

Gunthorpe ward
Party	Candidate	Votes	%	±%
Liberal Democrats	Sandra Christine Bond*	1,166	49.8	▲5.9
Conservative	John Philip Peach	853	36.4	▲2.5
Labour	Madison Challis	269	11.5	▲2.3
CPA	Tom Rogers	54	2.3	NEW
Majority		313	13.4	▲3.4
Turnout		2,342	35.5	▼1.8
Liberal Democrats hold		Swing	Steady	

=== Hampton Vale ===
The Green Party (5.4%) did not contest this time.

Hampton Vale ward
Party	Candidate	Votes	%	±%
Liberal Democrats	Chris Wiggin*	549	47.2	▼3.2
Conservative	Rhys Evans	402	34.5	▲13.1
Labour	Abdul Mannan	213	18.3	▼4.6
Majority		147	12.6	▼14.9
Turnout		1,164	23.0	▼2.9
Liberal Democrats hold		Swing	Steady	

=== Hargate and Hempsted ===
Councillor Howard left the Conservative group less than five weeks after being re-elected.

Hargate & Hempsted ward
Party	Candidate	Votes	%	±%
Conservative	John Ian Howard*	637	47.7	▲8.4
Labour	Timothy Kujiyat	511	38.2	▲20.5
Liberal Democrats	Rachel Ann Speed	113	8.5	▼26.7
Green	Michael Robert Whitaker	75	5.6	▼2.2
Majority		126	9.4	▲5.3
Turnout		1,336	21.0	▼3.1
Conservative hold		Swing	Steady	

=== North ===
UKIP (9.9%) and the Liberal Democrats (5.3%) did not contest this election.

The incumbent was Ansar Ali who had resigned from the Labour Party.

North ward
Party	Candidate	Votes	%	±%
Labour Co-op	Asim Mahmood	1,078	42.9	▼10.2
Independent	Ansar Ali*	863	34.4	NEW
Conservative	Akim Akim	393	15.6	▼12.7
Green	Tracey Foreman	178	7.1	▲3.8
Majority		215	8,6	▼16.2
Turnout		2,512	35.5	▼4.2
Labour Co-op gain from Independent		Swing	Steady	

=== Orton Longueville ===
UKIP (16.7%) and the Liberal Democrats (5.7%) did not contest this election.

The incumbent, Heather Skibsted, defected to the Green Party from Labour.

Orton Longueville ward
Party	Candidate	Votes	%	±%
Green	Heather Skibsted*	868	44.0	▲27.5
Conservative	Aqib Mohammed Farooq	561	28.4	▼1.5
Labour Co-op	Wendy Mary Smith	545	27.6	▼3.7
Majority		307	15.6	
Turnout		1,974	26.5	▼3.6
Green gain from Labour		Swing		

=== Orton Waterville ===
The incumbent, Nicola Day, is Green Party group leader.

Orton Waterville ward
Party	Candidate	Votes	%	±%
Green	Nicola Day*	1,786	69.8	▲5.8
Conservative	Matthew Jon Bliszczak	496	19.4	▼8.3
Labour	Oluwaseun Akinyele	205	8.0	▲1.9
Liberal Democrats	Vince Carroll	73	2.9	▲0.8
Majority		1,290	50.4	▲14.1
Turnout		2,560	36.0	▼3.9
Green hold		Swing	Steady	

=== Park ===
There were two vacant seats in this ward following the resignation of Shaz Nawaz (elected 2021, Labour).

The incumbent, Ikra Yasin (Labour), did not seek re-election.

Park ward (2 seats)
Party	Candidate	Votes	%	±%
Conservative	Khan Arfan	1,660	47.6	▲5.0
Conservative	Muhammad Asif	1,148	32.9	▼11.7
Labour Co-op	Junayd Hussain	1,024	29.3	▼17.4
Labour	Sabra Yasin	1,003	28.7	▼20.9
Green	Fiona Radic	529	15.2	▲9.4
Green	Steve Wilson	341	9.8	NEW
Liberal Democrats	Ian Hardman	197	5.6	▲0.8
Reform	Sue Morris	80	2.3	NEW
Majority		636	18.2	
Turnout		3,490	44.6	▼1.7
Conservative gain from Labour Co-op		Swing	Steady	
Conservative gain from Labour		Swing	Steady	

=== Paston and Walton ===
UKIP (15.5%) did not contest this time.

Paston & Walton ward
Party	Candidate	Votes	%	±%
Liberal Democrats	Simon Frederick Barkham*	836	44.9	▼3.1
Conservative	Alex Rafiq	597	32.0	▲21.5
Labour	David Powell	352	18.9	▼2.6
Green	Simon Mayhew	78	4.2	▼0.3
Majority		239	12.8	▼13.7
Turnout		1,863	25.9	▼3.9
Liberal Democrats hold		Swing	Steady	

=== Ravensthorpe ===
UKIP (12.7%) did not contest this election.

The incumbent, Lucinda Robinson (Labour Co-op), is not seeking re-election.

Ravensthorpe ward
Party	Candidate	Votes	%	±%
Conservative	Raja Sabeel Ahmed	1,239	48.3	▲11.7
Labour Co-op	Jason McNally	872	34.0	▼6.7
Green	Edward Murphy	363	14.2	▲9.8
Liberal Democrats	Richard Cham	91	3.5	▼2.1
Majority		367	14.3	Steady
Turnout		2,565	34.4	▼0.4
Conservative gain from Labour		Swing	Steady	

=== Stanground South ===
UKIP (17.8%) did not contest this election.

Rush defected from the Conservatives to Peterborough First less than two weeks after being re-elected.

Stanground South ward
Party	Candidate	Votes	%	±%
Conservative	Brian Rush*	798	49.4	▲2.4
Labour	Harry Lewis	553	34.2	▲11.6
Green	Stuart Middleton	165	10.2	▲2.8
Liberal Democrats	Simon John Garner	101	6.2	▲1.0
Majority		245	15.2	▼9.2
Turnout		1,617	21.6	▼2.4
Conservative hold		Swing	Steady	

=== Werrington ===
This is the first time Werrington First have contested an election under the "Peterborough First – Werrington Independent" description.

Werrington ward
Party	Candidate	Votes	%	±%
Peterborough First	Judy Fox*	1,672	66.3	▼8.4
Labour	Rosalind Jones	332	13.2	▲7.3
Conservative	Hayley Jayne Shelton	280	11.1	▼0.4
Green	Georgia Wade	158	6.3	▲1.0
Liberal Democrats	Simon James Kail	78	3.1	▲0.5
Majority		1,340	53.2	▼11.0
Turnout		2,520	32.8	▼2.1
Peterborough First hold		Swing	Steady	

=== West ===
UKIP (10.5%) did not contest this election.

The incumbent, Wayne Fitzgerald, is Leader of the Council.

West ward
Party	Candidate	Votes	%	±%
Conservative	Wayne Fitzgerald*	842	51.7	▼2.2
Labour	Lorraine Andison	414	25.4	▲7.7
Green	Collette Francis	260	16.0	▲7.8
Liberal Democrats	Polly Geraghty	114	7.0	▼2.7
Majority		428	26.3	▼9.9
Turnout		1,630	39.6	▼0.2
Conservative hold		Swing	Steady	

== Changes 2023–2024 ==
- Councillors Bisby, Hiller and Rush defected from the Conservatives to Peterborough First just two weeks after the local election in May 2023. Councillor Elsey defected the following day.
- Councillor Mohammed Farooq was suspended by the Conservative Party in May 2023. Despite being re-admitted in June, Cllr (M) Farooq quit the party due to a "bullying, toxic culture - followed by his son, Cllr Saqib Farooq and ward-colleague Cllr John Howard.
