= 2027 Peterborough City Council election =

2027 English local government election

- 6 May 2027

20 out of 60 seats to Peterborough City Council 31 seats needed for a majority
Leader	Wayne Fitzgerald	Shabina Qayyum
Party	Conservative	Labour	Independent
Leader's seat	West	East
Last election	13 seats, 23.3%	11 seats, 15.1%	9 seats, 3.3%
Current seats	14	10	9
Leader	Christian Hogg	Chris Harper	Heather Skibsted
Party	Liberal Democrats	Peterborough First	Green
Leader's seat	Fletton & Stanground	Stanground South	Orton Longueville
Last election	8 seats, 9.7%	8 seats, 4.0%	6 seats, 17.0%
Current seats	8	8	7
Leader	Andrew O'Neil
Party	Reform
Leader's seat	Fletton & Woodston
Last election	5 seats, 27.2%
Current seats	4
Incumbent Leader
Shabina Qayyum
Labour Co-op
No overall control (Note: Labour–Liberal Democrats–Peterborough First coalition.)

The 2027 Peterborough City Council election will be held on 6 May 2027 to elect members of Peterborough City Council in Cambridgeshire, England. This will be on the same day as other local elections held across the United Kingdom.

== Background ==
=== Local government reorganisation ===
Due to proposed structural changes to local government in England, the 2026 election was intended to be the final election to the council before it was abolished and replaced by a new unitary authority. However, on 7 September 2026, the government announced it was withdrawing plans for the planned restructuring pending review. Following this announcement, local elections due to be held in 2027 under the existing local electoral calendar would proceed.

== Summary ==
=== Election result ===
2027 Peterborough City Council election
Party	This election				Full council			This election		
Party	Candidates	Seats	Net	Seats %	Other	Total	Total %	Votes	Votes %	+/−
Conservative					8					
Labour					6					
Independent					8					
Liberal Democrats					5					
Peterborough First					5					
Green					5					
Reform					3					

=== Incumbents ===
Ward	Incumbent councillor	Affiliation	Re-standing
Bretton	Richard Stangward	Labour	
Central	Mohammed Jamil	Labour	
Dogsthorpe	Katy Cole	Labour	
East	Shabina Qayyum	Labour Co-op	
Eye, Thorney & Newborough	Steve Allen	Conservative	
Fletton & Stanground	Jade Seager	Liberal Democrats	
Fletton & Woodston	Andrew O'Neil	Reform	
Glinton & Castor	Peter Hiller	Peterborough First	
Gunthorpe	Sandra Bond	Liberal Democrats	
Hampton Vale	Chris Wiggin	Liberal Democrats	
Hargate & Hempsted	John Howard	Conservative	
North	Asim Mahmood	Conservative	
Orton Longueville	Heath Skibsted	Green	
Orton Waterville	Nicola Day	Green	
Park	Arfan Khan	Conservative	
Paston & Walton	Simon Barkham	Independent	
Ravensthorpe	Raja Ahmed	Conservative	
Stanground South	Brian Rush	Peterborough First	
Werrington	Judy Fox	Peterborough First	
West	Wayne Fitzgerald	Conservative	
