= 2024 Peterborough City Council election =

Local election in Peterborough, England

- 2 May 2024

23 out of 60 seats to Peterborough City Council 31 seats needed for a majority

	First party	Second party	Third party
Leader	Dennis Jones	Chris Harper	Wayne Fitzgerald
Party	Labour	Peterborough First	Conservative
Last election	14 seats, 32.1%	4 seats, 3.8%	30 seats, 35.5%
Seats before	14	10	22
Seats won	7	8	3
Seats after	19	14	11
Seat change	▲5	▲3	▼11
Popular vote	12,153	7,279	13,782
Percentage	26.0%	15.6%	29.5%
Swing	▼6.1%	▲11.8%	▼6.0%
	Fourth party	Fifth party	Sixth party
Leader	Christian Hogg	Nicola Day
Party	Liberal Democrats	Green	Independent
Last election	8 seats, 11.6%	3 seats, 14.1%	1 seat, 2.5%
Seats before	8	2	3
Seats won	2	2	1
Seats after	9	4	3
Seat change	▲1	▲2	Steady
Popular vote	4,393	6,297	2,318
Percentage	9.4%	13.5%	5.0%
Swing	▼2.2%	▼0.6%	▲2.5%
- Winner of each seat at the 2024 Peterborough City Council election
Leader before election
Mohammed Farooq
Peterborough First
No overall control
Leader after election
Dennis Jones
Labour
No overall control

The 2024 Peterborough City Council election took place on 2 May 2024 to elect members of Peterborough City Council in Cambridgeshire, England. 23 of the 60 seats on the council were contested, including an early election in Werrington. The election took place alongside other local elections across England.

== Overview ==
Prior to the election, the council was under no overall control, being led by a minority administration of local party Peterborough First.

All but two seats up for election in 2024 were last defended in 2021. Park ward was last defended in 2023, whilst one vacated seat in Werrington was last defended in 2022.

Going into the election, the position of the parties and the number of seats they were defending was:

- Conservative: 17 defences* (8 other seats)
- Labour (and co-operative) Party: 2 defences (12 other seats)
- Peterborough First: 2 defences** (6 other seats)
- Liberal Democrats: 1 defence (7 other seats)
- Green Party: 1 defence (2 other seats)
- Independents: 0 defences*** (2 other seats)

*Two of the Conservative defences were in Stanground South and Wittering, where the incumbents had defected to Peterborough First.

**Peterborough First's two defences were in Werrington, where the incumbents were elected for the group's predecessor, Werrington First.

***The Green Party's defence was in Orton Waterville, where the incumbent councillor - Kirsty Knight - resigned from the party shortly before the election.

Following the election, the council remained under no overall control. Labour became the largest party. Labour subsequently formed a minority administration, with their group leader Dennis Jones being formally appointed leader of the council at the subsequent annual council meeting on 20 May 2024.

== Overall results ==
2024 Peterborough City Council election
Party	This election				Full council			This election		
Party	Candidates	Seats	Net	Seats %	Other	Total	Total %	Votes	Votes %	+/−
Labour	{{{candidates}}}	7	▲5	30.4	12	19	31.7	12,153	26.0	–6.1
Peterborough First	{{{candidates}}}	8	▲3	34.8	6	14	23.3	7,279	15.6	+11.8
Conservative	{{{candidates}}}	3	▼11	13.0	8	11	18.3	13,782	29.5	–6.0
Liberal Democrats	{{{candidates}}}	2	▲1	8.7	7	9	15.0	4,393	9.4	–2.2
Green	{{{candidates}}}	2	▲2	8.7	2	4	6.7	6,297	13.5	–0.6
Independent	{{{candidates}}}	1	Steady	4.3	2	3	5.0	2,318	5.0	+2.5
Reform	{{{candidates}}}	0	Steady	0.0	0	0	0.0	111	0.2	±0.0
TUSC	{{{candidates}}}	0	Steady	0.0	0	0	0.0	232	0.5	+0.3
Workers Party	{{{candidates}}}	0	Steady	0.0	0	0	0.0	89	0.2	N/A

== Ward results ==
Asterisks denote incumbent councillors seeking re-election. Unless otherwise noted, the councillors seeking re-election were elected in 2021; changes in vote share are therefore compared to the 2021 election.

=== Barnack ===
The incumbent, David Over (Conservative) did not contest this election.

Barnack ward
Party	Candidate	Votes	%	±%
Conservative	Irene Walsh	437	39.9	▼23.2
Independent	Kevin Tighe	396	36.2	NEW
Labour	Stephanie Gillian Matthews	132	12.1	▲1.8
Liberal Democrats	Beki Sellick	70	6.4	▼9.3
Green	June Bull	60	5.5	▼5.5
Majority		41	3.7	▼43.8
Turnout		1,095	39.9	▼2.77
Conservative hold		Swing	Steady	

=== Bretton ===
UKIP (3.35% in 2021) and For Britain (1.08% in 2021) did not contest this election.

Bretton ward
Party	Candidate	Votes	%	±%
Labour Co-op	Nicola Jenkins	835	44.2	▲3.3
Conservative	Chaz Fenner*	757	40.1	▼8.4
Green	Mark Williams	175	9.3	NEW
Liberal Democrats	Rohan Wilson	121	6.4	▲0.3
Majority		78	4.1	
Turnout		1,888	27.9	▼3.8
Labour Co-op gain from Conservative		Swing	Steady	

=== Central ===
Freedom Alliance (2.42% in 2021) did not contest this election.

Central ward
Party	Candidate	Votes	%	±%
Labour Co-op	Amjad Iqbal*	1,377	48.1	▼11.7
Green	Mohammed Aziz Munir	820	28.6	▲23.1
Conservative	Jenae Hannah Toni Gloria Holton	412	14.4	▼11.5
Liberal Democrats	Jason Kerridge	161	5.6	▼0.7
TUSC	Steve Cawley	94	3.3	NEW
Majority		557	19.4	▼14.5
Turnout		2,864	31.6	▼9.5
Labour Co-op hold		Swing	Steady	

=== Dogsthorpe ===
Colin Hargreaves (Independent – 11.35% in 2021) and UKIP (3.95% in 2021) did not contest this election.

Dogsthorpe ward
Party	Candidate	Votes	%	±%
Labour Co-op	Jason McNally	766	39.5	▲4.1
Conservative	Ishfaq Hussain*	760	39.2	▲0.3
Green	Matthew Gray	178	9.2	▲5.7
Liberal Democrats	Sandra Ringler	145	7.5	▲0.5
Workers Party	Rob Petch	89	4.6	NEW
Majority		6	0.3	
Turnout		1,938	28.0	▼4.4
Labour Co-op gain from Conservative		Swing	Steady	

=== East ===
Incumbent Jackie Allen (Conservative) did not contest this seat in 2024. She, instead, contested the Orton Waterville ward.

East ward
Party	Candidate	Votes	%	±%
Labour	Numan Ali Iqbal	1,080	44.7	▲0.4
Conservative	Aleem Miran	870	36.0	▼9.4
Green	Bismah Noor	192	7.9	▲3.0
Independent	Jo Johnson	152	6.3	NEW
Liberal Democrats	Adam Bruzda	123	5.1	▼0.3
Majority		210	8.7	
Turnout		2,417	31.5	▼1.3
Labour gain from Conservative		Swing	Steady	

=== Eye, Thorney and Newborough ===
Incumbent Nigel Simons (Conservative) and the Liberal Democrats (3.6% in 2021) did not contest this election.

Eye, Thorney and Newborough ward
Party	Candidate	Votes	%	±%
Peterborough First	Mark David Michael Ormston	862	36.0	NEW
Conservative	John Philip Peach	853	35.6	▼34.4
Labour	John Francis Shearman	540	22.5	▲4.4
Green	Carol Sarah Johnson	141	5.9	▼2.4
Majority		9	0.4	
Turnout		2,396	32.0	▼0.5
Peterborough First gain from Conservative		Swing	Steady	

=== Fletton and Stanground ===
Incumbent Oliver Sainsbury (Conservative) and John Whitby (Independent – 10.6% in 2021) did not contest this election.

Fletton and Stanground ward
Party	Candidate	Votes	%	±%
Liberal Democrats	Polly Geraghty	884	52.3	▲25.6
Labour	Muhammad Mujtaba Hashimi	338	20.0	Steady
Conservative	Chibuzo Okpala	299	17.7	▼17.7
Green	Sam Creedon-Gray	168	9.9	▲2.7
Majority		546	32.3	
Turnout		1,689	22.8	▼4.12
Liberal Democrats gain from Conservative		Swing	Steady	

=== Fletton and Woodston ===
Freedom Alliance (2.7% in 2021) did not contest this election.

Blakemore-Creedon's win made her one of the youngest councillors in the country - and the youngest ever elected in Peterborough.

Fletton and Woodston ward
Party	Candidate	Votes	%	±%
Labour	Daisy Blakemore-Creedon	940	48.1	▲9.6
Conservative	Andy Coles*	658	33.6	▼7.5
Green	Adam Warr	222	11.3	▲0.1
Liberal Democrats	Simon John Garner	99	5.1	▼1.4
TUSC	Jon Lloyd	37	1.9	NEW
Majority		282	14.4	
Turnout		1,956	25.3	▼7.1
Labour gain from Conservative		Swing	Steady	

=== Glinton and Castor ===
The incumbent, Saqib Farooq (Peterborough First), defected from the Conservative Party in July 2023. He will not fight this seat in 2024, instead, contesting Hargate and Hempsted.

Glinton and Castor ward
Party	Candidate	Votes	%	±%
Peterborough First	Neil David Boyce	714	39.3	NEW
Conservative	Andrew Stephen Willey	539	29.6	▼38.0
Labour	Sue Farr	270	14.8	▲4.5
Liberal Democrats	Claire Bysshe	174	9.6	▼3.2
Green	Greg Guthrie	122	6.7	▼2.6
Majority		175	9.6	
Turnout		1,819	35.2	▼7.0
Peterborough First hold		Swing	Steady	

=== Gunthorpe ===
Christian Peoples Alliance (1.3% in 2021) did not contest this election.

Gunthorpe ward
Party	Candidate	Votes	%	±%
Liberal Democrats	Ann Louise Shaheed	899	41.8	▲9.1
Conservative	Bryan Tyler*	865	40.3	▼13.2
Labour	Joanna Susan Weedon	303	14.1	▲1.6
Green	Shazad Ali	82	3.8	NEW
Majority		34	1.6	
Turnout		2,149	31.7	▼4.6
Liberal Democrats gain from Conservative		Swing	Steady	

=== Hampton Vale ===
Hampton Vale ward
Party	Candidate	Votes	%	±%
Peterborough First	Roger Antunes	400	29.8	NEW
Conservative	Lindsay John Sharp*	327	24.4	▼19.4
Liberal Democrats	Neil Christopher Walton	292	21.8	▼7.3
Labour	Christopher Martin McCarthy	256	19.1	▼3.2
Green	Charles Rhys Coster	66	4.9	NEW
Majority		73	5.4	
Turnout		1,341	24.8	▲2.7
Peterborough First gain from Conservative		Swing	Steady	

=== Hargate and Hempsted ===
Incumbent Nicolle Trust (Conservative) did not contest this election.

Saqib Farooq (Peterborough First) was an incumbent councillor in Glinton and Castor prior to this election.

Hargate and Hempsted ward
Party	Candidate	Votes	%	±%
Peterborough First	Saqib Mohammed Farooq	826	45.4	NEW
Conservative	Vishal Vichare	421	23.1	▼24.2
Labour	Kelly Jesus	364	20.0	▼2.2
Green	Amanda Horne	124	6.8	▼1.2
Liberal Democrats	Rachel Ann Speed	86	4.7	▼17.8
Majority		405	22.2	
Turnout		1,821	26.1	▲1.64
Peterborough First gain from Conservative		Swing	Steady	

=== North ===
Incumbent Mohammed Haseeb (Labour) did not contest this election.

North ward
Party	Candidate	Votes	%	±%
Labour	Zameer Ali	1,078	46.2	▼11.6
Conservative	Mohammed Tokir	640	27.4	▼3.7
Green	Misbah Shafiq	419	18.0	▲12.4
TUSC	John Anthony McGarry	101	4.3	NEW
Liberal Democrats	Deeshen Ruttun	95	4.1	▼1.5
Majority		438	18.8	▼7.9
Turnout		2,333	32.0	▼9.0
Labour hold		Swing	Steady	

=== Orton Longueville ===
Incumbent Graham Casey (Conservative) did not contest this election.

Orton Longueville ward
Party	Candidate	Votes	%	±%
Green	Imtiaz Ali	669	30.8	▲16.3
Conservative	Ekta Patel	647	29.8	▼17.0
Labour	David Frederick John Baker	521	24.0	▼5.3
Independent	Nick Penniall	251	11.6	NEW
Liberal Democrats	Nicola Mills	84	3.9	▼5.5
Majority		22	1.0	
Turnout		2,172		Steady
Green gain from Conservative		Swing	Steady	

=== Orton Waterville ===
The incumbent, Kirsty Knight (Independent), quit the Green Party in March 2024.

Conservative Party candidate Jackie Allen was an incumbent councillor in East Ward prior to the election.

Orton Waterville ward
Party	Candidate	Votes	%	±%
Independent	Kirsty Knight*	1,254	48.2	NEW
Green	Ed Murphy	701	26.9	▼25.7
Conservative	Jackie Allen	440	16.9	▼17.1
Labour	Oluwaseun Akinyele	207	8.0	Steady
Majority		553	21.3	
Turnout		2,602	36.2	▼3.8
Independent hold		Swing	Steady	

=== Park ===
This seat was last contested in 2023, changes in vote share are therefore compared to the 2023 election.

Incumbent Muhammad Asif (Conservative) did not contest this election.

Park ward
Party	Candidate	Votes	%	±%
Labour Co-op	Angus Alexander Ellis	827	33.6	▲4.3
Conservative	Murtaza Ahmed Munir	825	33.5	▼14.1
Green	Iqra Ali	509	20.7	▲5.5
Reform	Sue Morris	111	4.5	▲2.2
Liberal Democrats	Ian Hardman	95	3.9	▼1.7
Independent	Fiona Radic	94	3.8	NEW
Majority		2	0.1	
Turnout		2,461	34.0	▼10.6
Labour Co-op gain from Conservative		Swing	Steady	

=== Paston and Walton ===
Paston and Walton ward
Party	Candidate	Votes	%	±%
Conservative	Alex Rafiq	824	39.8	▲10.3
Liberal Democrats	Nick Sandford*	819	39.6	▼6.7
Labour	Callum Patrick Alexander	339	16.4	▼7.8
Green	Ali Shokat	86	4.2	NEW
Majority		5	0.2	
Turnout		2,068	28.5	▼0.4
Conservative gain from Liberal Democrats		Swing	Steady	

=== Ravensthorpe ===
Ravensthorpe ward
Party	Candidate	Votes	%	±%
Green	Qaiser Farid	1,045	39.3	▲33.9
Conservative	Gul Nawaz*	944	35.5	▼21.7
Labour	Abdul Mannan	598	22.5	▼10.1
Liberal Democrats	Raja Ejaz Ahmed Khan	74	2.8	▼2.0
Majority		101	3.8	
Turnout		2,661	34.9	▼2.6
Green gain from Conservative		Swing	Steady	

=== Stanground South ===
The incumbent, Chris Harper (Leader of Peterborough First), defected from the Conservative Party in December 2021.

Stanground South ward
Party	Candidate	Votes	%	±%
Peterborough First	Chris Harper*	1,111	56.2	NEW
Labour	Margaret Thulbourn	404	20.4	▼4.2
Conservative	Neil Frank Seekings	373	18.9	▼45.6
Green	Joe Horne	88	4.5	▼2.2
Majority		707	35.8	
Turnout		1,976	25.5	▼1.5
Peterborough First hold		Swing	Steady	

=== Werrington ===
One vacant seat was up for election, alongside the incumbent.

The two seats were previously represented by Werrington First - the predecessor group to Peterborough First.

Werrington ward (2 Seats)
Party	Candidate	Votes	%	±%
Peterborough First	John Raymond Fox*	1,664	55.8	▼5.4
Peterborough First	Sarah Areatha Hillier	1,307	43.8	▼9.3
Conservative	Sara Louise Bristow	626	21.0	▲2.1
Labour	Roz Jones	421	14.1	▲2.1
Conservative	Ruta Dalton	392	13.1	▼6.1
Green	Katherine Ann Sharp	178	6.0	▲0.4
Green	Barry Warne	103	3.5	▼2.9
Liberal Democrats	Simon James Kail	92	3.1	▲0.7
Majority		1,038	34.8	▼7.5
Turnout		2,981	33.8	▼2.3
Peterborough First hold		Swing	-	
Peterborough First hold		Swing	-	

=== West ===
Freedom Alliance (1.9% in 2021) and UKIP (1.7% in 2021) did not contest this election.

West ward
Party	Candidate	Votes	%	±%
Conservative	Lynne Ayres*	663	43.2	▼14.4
Labour Co-op	Christopher Ian Cole	472	30.7	▲5.4
Independent	Collette Francis	171	11.1	NEW
Green	Chelsea Windsor	149	9.7	▲2.6
Liberal Democrats	Annie Geraghty	80	5.2	▼1.2
Majority		191	12.4	−19.9
Turnout		1,535	36.8	▼4.3
Conservative hold		Swing	Steady	

=== Wittering ===
The incumbent Gavin Elsey (Peterborough First) defected from the Conservative Party in May 2023.

John Stannage (Independent – 14.3% in 2021), the Green Party (25.35%) and the Liberal Democrats (3.14%) will not be contesting this election.

Wittering ward
Party	Candidate	Votes	%	±%
Peterborough First	Gavin Elsey*	395	57.2	NEW
Conservative	Chantel Saunders	210	30.4	▼19.1
Labour	Julie Hall	85	12.3	▲4.7
Majority		185	26.8	
Turnout		690	28.2	▼4.5
Peterborough First hold		Swing	Steady	

== Changes 2024–2026 ==
- Simon Barkham, elected for the Liberal Democrats, left the party to sit as an independent shortly after the May 2024 elections.
- Irene Walsh, elected as a Conservative in Barnack, resigned. The by-election on 1 May 2025 was won by Kevin Tighe (Independent).
- Councillor Nick Thulbourn, elected to Fletton & Woodston most recently in May 2023 died in December 2025. The by-election was held on 12 February 2026.
- Councillor Alan Dowson another member representing Fletton & Woodston, died in January 2026. A by-election was held in July.

=== By-elections ===
==== Barnack ====
Barnack by-election: 1 May 2025
Party	Candidate	Votes	%	±%
Independent	Kevin Tighe	524	41.8	+5.6
Reform	Yvonne Scarrott	289	23.0	N/A
Conservative	Andy Coles	277	22.1	–17.8
Labour	Catherine Reid	106	8.5	–3.6
Green	David Pardoe	58	4.6	–0.9
Majority		235	18.8	N/A
Turnout		1,257	45.0	+5.1
Registered electors		2,791		
Independent gain from Conservative				

==== Fletton and Woodston ====
Fletton and Woodston by-election: 12 February 2026
Party	Candidate	Votes	%	±%
Reform	Andrew O'Neil	565	29.43	NEW
Green	Ed Murphy	529	27.55	▲6.78
Conservative	Andrew Willey	419	21.82	▼14.92
Labour	Harvey Woodhouse	323	16.82	▼20.52
Liberal Democrats	Neil Walton	84	4.38	▼0.63
Majority		36	1.88	
Turnout		1,926	25.2	−0.22
Registered electors				
Reform gain from Labour				
