= 2018 Peterborough City Council election =

Local election in Peterborough, England

← 2016	3 May 2018	2019 →

18 seats (out of 60 seats) to Peterborough City Council 31 seats needed for a majority

	First party	Second party	Third party
Party	Conservative	Labour	Liberal Democrats
Last election		13	7
Seats before	30	14	5
Seats won	7	6	3
Seats after	31	13	6
Seat change	▲1	▼1	Steady
Popular vote	14,630	14,059	4,399
Percentage	35.5%	34.1%	10.7%
Swing	▼3.3%	▲2.1%	▲4.1%
	Fourth party	Fifth party	Sixth party
Party	Werrington First	Independent	Liberal
Last election	3	0	3
Seats before	3	2	3
Seats won	1	0	0
Seats after	3	2	2
Seat change	Steady	Steady	▼1
Popular vote	1,420	914	560
Percentage	3.4%	2.2%	1.4%
Swing	▼0.6%	▲0.7%	▼1.4%
	Seventh party	Eighth party
Party	Green	UKIP
Last election	0	2
Seats before	0	2
Seats won	1	0
Seats after	1	1
Seat change	▲1	▼1
Popular vote	3,164	2,068
Percentage	4.1%	5.0%
Swing	▲3.6%	▼5.3%
- Map showing the results of the 2018 Peterborough City Council election

Elections to Peterborough City Council took place on 3 May 2018. This was on the same day as other local elections across the United Kingdom.

== Results summary ==
Following the 2016 election, two councillors from Gunthorpe ward left the Liberal Democrat group to sit as Independents.

Peterborough City Council election, 2018
Party	Seats	Gains	Losses	Net gain/loss	Seats %	Votes %	Votes	+/−
Conservative	31	3	2	▲1	51.7	35.5	14,630	▼3.3
Labour	14	2	3	▼1	23.3	34.1	14,059	▲2.1
Liberal Democrats	6	0	0	Steady	10.0	10.7	4,399	▲4.1
Werrington First	3	0	0	Steady	5.0	3.4	1,420	▼0.6
Independent	2	0	0	Steady	3.3	2.2	914	▲0.7
Liberal	2	0	1	▼1	3.3	1.4	560	▼1.4
Green	1	1	0	▲1	1.7	4.1	3,164	▲3.6
UKIP	1	0	1	▼1	1.7	10.3	2,068	▼5.3
Total	60						41,214	
Conservative gain from No overall control								

== Ward results ==
=== Bretton ===
Bretton ward, 3 May 2018
Party	Candidate	Votes	%	±%
Conservative	Scott Warren	851	41.8	▲11.3
Labour	Jo Johnson	824	40.5	▲5.8
UKIP	Graham Whitehead	188	9.2	▼21.1
Liberal Democrats	Simon Kail	92	4.5	▼3.7
Green	Barry Warne	80	3.9	▼7.8
Majority		27	1.3	−
Turnout		2,035	30.8	
Conservative gain from Labour		Swing	▲5.3	

=== Central ===
Central ward, 3 May 2018
Party	Candidate	Votes	%	±%
Labour	Mahboob Hussain	1,794	52.8	▲7.5
Independent	Mohammad Choudhary	659	19.4	New
Conservative	Louise Coles	601	17.7	▼12.3
Liberal Democrats	Alan Summerside	132	3.9	New
Green	Steve Wilson	125	3.7	▼8.2
UKIP	Jeff Lipscomb	86	2.5	▼8.5
Majority		1,135	33.4	—
Turnout		3,397	45.0	
Labour hold		Swing	—	

=== Dogsthorpe ===
Dogsthorpe ward, 3 May 2018
Party	Candidate	Votes	%	±%
Labour	Dennis Jones	954	49.8	▲20.9
Liberal	Sandra Ringler	560	29.2	▼12.6
Conservative	Christopher Moon	255	13.3	▲4.4
UKIP	Romana Cammarata	88	4.6	▼11.3
Green	Carolyn English	58	3.0	▼2.8
Majority		394	20.6	—
Turnout		1,915		
Labour gain from Liberal		Swing		

=== East ===
East ward, 3 May 2018
Party	Candidate	Votes	%	±%
Labour	Samantha Hemraj	1,131	48.3	▲13.6
Conservative	Muhammad Ikram	892	38.1	▲3.8
UKIP	Graham McMillan	88	4.5	▼16.9
Green	Stefen Clements	58	3.0	New
Majority		239	10.2	—
Turnout		2,342		
Labour hold		Swing	▲7.8	

No Liberal candidate as previous (-6.6).

=== Eye, Thorney & Newborough ===
Eye, Thorney & Newborough ward, 3 May 2018
Party	Candidate	Votes	%	±%
Conservative	Richard Brown	1,252	54.5	▲21.8
Labour	Christian Defeo	656	28.6	▲9.9
UKIP	Layton Mills	214	9.3	▼15.8
Green	Michael Alexander	105	4.6	▼8.8
Liberal Democrats	Callum.A.Robertson	70	3.0	New
Majority		596	25.9	
Turnout		2,297		
Conservative hold		Swing		

No Independent candidate as previous (-20.5).

=== Fletton & Stanground ===
Fletton & Stanground
Party	Candidate	Votes	%	±%
Liberal Democrats	Christian Hogg	920	42.5	▲8.2
Conservative	Bryan Tyler	453	20.9	▲0.3
Labour	Chris Skidmore	448	20.7	▼9.1
UKIP	Peter Reeve	221	10.2	▼19.4
Green	Karen Alexander	70	3.2	▼8.1
Independent	Peter Slinger	53	2.4	▼10.0
Majority		467	21.6	
Turnout		2,165		▲
Liberal Democrats gain from Labour		Swing	▲5.9	

=== Fletton & Woodston ===
Fletton & Woodston ward, 3 May 2018
Party	Candidate	Votes	%	±%
Labour	Alan Dowson	876	43.6	▲9.3
Conservative	Nigel North	864	43.0	▲11.8
Green	David Stevenson	268	13.3	▼2.6
Majority		12	0.6	
Turnout		2,008		
Labour hold		Swing	▲1.4	

No Independent (-16.7) or TUSC (-4.9) candidates as previous.

=== Gunthorpe ===
Gunthorpe ward, 3 May 2018
Party	Candidate	Votes	%	±%
Liberal Democrats	Andrew Bond	1,097	48.7	▲16.0
Conservative	Emily Fisher	688	30.6	▲5.0
Labour	Haggai Odep	205	9.1	▼6.4
Independent	Antony Lockheart	120	5.3	New
UKIP	Mark Boylan-Taylor	92	4.1	▼15.6
Green	Cherry Beeby	50	2.2	New
Majority		409	18.1	
Turnout		2,252		
Liberal Democrats hold		Swing	▲2.0	

=== Hampton Vale ===
Hampton Vale ward, 3 May 2018
Party	Candidate	Votes	%	±%
Conservative	Marco Cereste	529	52.5	▲20.2
Labour	Mohammed Munir	292	29.0	▲0.9
Liberal Democrats	Nicola Mills	121	12.0	New
Green	Greg Guthrie	66	6.5	▼12.5
Majority		237	23.5	
Turnout		1,008		▲
Conservative hold		Swing		

=== Hargate & Hempsted ===
Hargate & Hempsted ward, 3 May 2018
Party	Candidate	Votes	%	±%
Conservative	Mohammed Farooq	616	49.1	▲18.1
Labour	Callie Louise Hargreaves	306	24.4	▼0.3
Liberal Democrats	Chris Wiggin	289	23.0	▼4.0
Green	Alex Bailey	44	3.5	New
Majority		310	24.7	
Turnout		1,255		▲
Conservative hold		Swing		

=== North ===
North ward, 3 May 2018
Party	Candidate	Votes	%	±%
Conservative	Shazia Bashir	1,233	44.5	▲5.4
Labour	Naz Bibi	1,156	41.7	▲1.3
UKIP	John Myles	134	4.8	▼9.6
Green	Nicola Day	131	4.7	▼4.8
Liberal Democrats	Phillip Whitley	115	4.2	▼3.8
Majority		77	2.8	—
Turnout		2,769	—	▲
Conservative gain from Labour		Swing		

=== Orton Longueville ===
Orton Longueville ward, 3 May 2018
Party	Candidate	Votes	%	±%
Conservative	Irene Walsh	850	37.9	▲12.6
Labour	Heather Skibsted	730	32.6	▲3.9
UKIP	John Okonkowski	322	14.4	▼22.4
Green	Alex Airey	170	7.6	▼10.7
Liberal Democrats	Daniel Gibbs	170	7.6	▼4.1
Majority		120	5.3	—
Turnout		2,242	—	—
Conservative gain from UKIP		Swing		

=== Orton Waterville ===
Orton Waterville ward, 3 May 2018
Party	Candidate	Votes	%	±%
Green	Julie Howell	1,413	50.8	▲27.8
Conservative	Gavin Elsey	1,058	38.0	▼9.6
Labour	Alan Gasperutti	249	8.9	▼9.2
Liberal Democrats	Rachel Speed	64	2.3	▼10.9
Majority		355	12.8	—
Turnout		2,784		
Green gain from Conservative		Swing		

No UKIP candidate as previous (-18.5).

=== Park ===
Park ward, 3 May 2018
Party	Candidate	Votes	%	±%
Labour	Aasiyah Joseph	1,714	53.8	▲16.6
Conservative	John Peach	1,260	39.6	▼3.2
Green	Fiona Radic	105	3.3	▼6.5
Liberal Democrats	Ian Hardman	104	3.3	▼1.2
Majority		454	14.2	—
Turnout		3,183	—	—
Labour hold		Swing		

No UKIP candidate as previous (-8.7).

=== Paston & Walton ===
Paston & Walton ward, 3 May 2018
Party	Candidate	Votes	%	±%
Liberal Democrats	Asif Shaheed	873	38.2	▲2.5
Labour	Jonas Hopogap Yonga	687	30.1	▲7.9
Conservative	Haq Nawaz	424	18.6	▼1.2
UKIP	Massimo Pinto	186	8.1	▼11.0
Green	Joseph Wells	114	5.0	New
Majority		186	8.1	
Turnout		2,284		▲
Liberal Democrats hold		Swing		

=== Ravensthorpe ===
Ravensthorpe ward, 3 May 2018
Party	Candidate	Votes	%	±%
Labour	Edward Murphy	1,285	45.8	▲6.5
Conservative	Paul Bristow	1,257	44.8	▲6.3
UKIP	Mark Perry	181	6.5	▼13.8
Green	Goran Radic	83	3.0	New
Majority		28	1.0	—
Turnout		2,806	—	—
Labour hold		Swing		

=== Stanground South ===
Stanground South ward, 3 May 2018
Party	Candidate	Votes	%	±%
Conservative	Ray Bisby	1,080	59.1	▲13.6
Labour	Tony Otley	481	26.3	▲0.4
UKIP	Lisa Ann Duffy	92	5.0	▼21.2
Independent	Julian Bray	82	4.5	New
Green	Jon Phillipson Brown	51	2.8	New
Liberal Democrats	Terri Haynes	42	2.3	New
Majority		559	32.8	
Turnout		1,828		▲
Conservative hold		Swing		

=== Werrington ===
Werrington ward, 3 May 2018
Party	Candidate	Votes	%	±%
Werrington First	Steve Lane	1,420	53.2	▲10.2
Conservative	Ruth Dalton	467	17.5	▲2.2
Liberal Democrats	Sandra Bond	310	11.6	New
Labour	Suzanne Marie White	291	10.9	▲1.3
Green	Roger Proudfoot	102	3.8	▼6.4
UKIP	June Kennedy	76	2.9	▼16.2
Majority		953	35.7	—
Turnout		2,666		
Werrington First hold		Swing		

== By-elections ==
=== Orton Longueville ===
Orton Longueville: 2 August 2018
Party	Candidate	Votes	%	±%
Conservative	Gavin Elsey	713	36.5	
Labour	Heather Skibsted	657	33.7	
Liberal Democrats	Daniel Gibbs	237	12.1	
Green	Alex Airey	201	10.3	
UKIP	Graham Whitehead	143	7.3	
Majority		56	2.8	
Turnout		1,951		
Conservative hold		Swing		
