= 2026 Peterborough City Council election =

2026 English local government election

- 7 May 2026

18 out of 60 seats to Peterborough City Council 31 seats needed for a majority
- Registered: 133,890
- Turnout: 47,181; 35.2%
	First party	Second party	Third party
Leader	Wayne Fitzgerald	Shabina Qayyum
Party	Conservative	Labour	Independent
Last election	11 seats, 29.5%	19 seats, 31.7%	3 seats, 5.0%
Seats before	10	13	12
Seats won	6	2	0
Seats after	13	11	9
Seat change	▲3	▼2	▼3
Popular vote	10,963	7,123	1,550
Percentage	23.3%	15.1%	3.3%
Swing	▼6.2%	▼10.9%	▼1.7%
	Fourth party	Fifth party	Sixth party
Leader	Christian Hogg	Chris Harper	Heather Skibsted
Party	Liberal Democrats	Peterborough First	Green
Last election	9 seats, 9.4%	14 seats, 15.6%	4 seats, 13.5%
Seats before	8	10	5
Seats won	3	1	2
Seats after	8	8	6
Seat change	Steady	▼2	▲1
Popular vote	4,544	1,898	7,989
Percentage	9.7%	4.0%	17.0%
Swing	▲0.3%	▼11.6%	▲3.5%
	Seventh party
Party	Reform
Last election	0 seats, 0.2%
Seats before	1
Seats won	4
Seats after	5
Seat change	▲4
Popular vote	12,790
Percentage	27.2%
Swing	▲27.0%
- Winner of each seat at the 2026 Peterborough City Council election.
Leader before election
Shabina Qayyum
Labour
No overall control (Note: Labour-Liberal Democrats-Peterborough First coalition.)
Leader after election
Shabina Qayyum
Labour
No overall control (Note: Labour-Liberal Democrats-Peterborough First coalition.)

The 2026 Peterborough City Council election took place on 7 May 2026 to elect members of Peterborough City Council in Cambridgeshire, England. This was on the same day as other local elections.

Prior to the election the council was under no overall control, being run by a coalition of Labour, the Liberal Democrats and local party Peterborough First, led by Labour councillor Shabina Qayyum. The council remained under no overall control following the election. The Conservatives overtook Labour to become the largest party, but the coalition of Labour, Liberal Democrats and Peterborough First continued to run the council, and Shabina Qayyum retained her position as leader of the council.

== Summary ==
=== Election result ===
2026 Peterborough City Council election
Party	This election				Full council			This election		
Party	Candidates	Seats	Net	Seats %	Other	Total	Total %	Votes	Votes %	+/−
Conservative	{{{candidates}}}	6	▲3	33.3	7	13	22.0	10,963	23.3	–6.2
Labour	{{{candidates}}}	2	▼3	11.1	8	10	16.9	7,123	15.1	–10.9
Independent	{{{candidates}}}	0	▼3	0.0	9	9	15.3	1,550	3.3	–1.7
Liberal Democrats	{{{candidates}}}	3	Steady	16.7	5	8	13.6	4,544	9.7	+0.3
Peterborough First	{{{candidates}}}	1	▼2	5.6	7	8	13.6	1,898	4.0	–11.6
Green	{{{candidates}}}	2	▲1	11.1	4	6	10.2	7,989	17.0	+3.5
Reform	{{{candidates}}}	4	▲4	22.2	1	5	8.5	12,790	27.2	+27.0
TUSC	{{{candidates}}}	0	Steady	0.0	0	0	0.0	86	0.2	–0.3
Your Party	{{{candidates}}}	0	Steady	0.0	0	0	0.0	78	0.2	N/A

== Incumbents ==
Ward	Incumbent councillor	Party	Re-standing
Bretton	Scott Warren	Conservative	Yes
Central	Alison Jones	Labour Co-op	No
Dogsthorpe	Dennis Jones (Note: Originally elected as Labour, but was suspended from the party.)	Independent	No
East	Samantha Hemraj	Labour Co-op	Yes
Eye, Thorney & Newborough	Rylan Ray (Note: Originally elected as a Conservative, but was suspended from the party.)	Independent	No
Fletton & Stanground	Christian Hogg	Liberal Democrats	Yes
Fletton & Woodston	Vacant	Labour Co-op (Note: Vacant seat last held by Labour Co-op.)	N/A
Gunthorpe	Andrew Bond	Liberal Democrats	Yes
Hampton Vale	Marco Cereste	Conservative	Yes
Hargate & Hempsted	Mohammed Farooq (Note: Originally elected as a Conservative, but left the party and defected to the Peterborough First group.)	Peterborough First	No
North	Noreen Bi	Labour Co-op	Yes
Orton Longueville	Michael Perkins	Conservative	No
Orton Waterville	Julie Stevenson (Note: Originally elected as a Green, but left the party to sit as an independent.)	Independent	No
Park	Mohammed Sabir	Labour Co-op	No
Paston & Walton	Asif Shaheed	Liberal Democrats	Yes
Ravensthorpe	Mohammed Rangzeb (Note: Originally elected as a Conservative, but left the party and defected to the Green Party.)	Green	No
Stanground South	Ray Bisby (Note: Originally elected as a Conservative, but left the party and defected to the Peterborough First group.)	Peterborough First	No
Werrington	Sarah Hillier	Peterborough First	Yes

== Candidates ==
=== Bretton ===
Bretton
Party	Candidate	Votes	%	±%
Reform	John Bolton	687	33.0	N/A
Conservative	Scott Warren*	627	30.1	–10.0
Labour	Susan Glasgow	407	19.5	–24.7
Green	David Narrainen	239	11.5	+2.2
Liberal Democrats	Rohan Wilson	124	6.0	–0.4
Majority		60	2.9	N/A
Turnout		2,084	30.8	+2.9
Registered electors		~6,766		
Reform gain from Conservative				

=== Central ===
Central
Party	Candidate	Votes	%	±%
Labour	Khurram Iqbal	1,106	34.6	–13.5
Green	Shaz Choudhary	1,069	33.5	+4.9
Conservative	Shahzadi Khan	403	12.6	–1.8
Reform	Jeff Pitt	399	12.5	N/A
Liberal Democrats	Jason Kerridge	173	5.4	–0.2
TUSC	Steve Cawley	45	1.4	–1.9
Majority		37	1.2	–18.2
Turnout		3,195	34.2	+2.6
Registered electors		~9,342		
Labour hold				

=== Dogsthorpe ===
Dogsthorpe
Party	Candidate	Votes	%	±%
Conservative	Ishfaq Hussain	692	31.0	–8.2
Reform	Bryan Tyler	579	26.0	N/A
Labour	Mohammad Haseeb	431	19.3	–20.2
Green	Pip Gardner	390	17.5	+8.3
Liberal Democrats	Sandra Ringler	103	4.6	–2.9
Independent	Petr Torak	36	1.6	N/A
Majority		113	5.1	N/A
Turnout		2,231	32.0	+4.0
Registered electors		~6,972		
Conservative gain from Independent				

=== East ===
East
Party	Candidate	Votes	%	±%
Labour Co-op	Sam Hemraj*	939	35.3	–9.4
Conservative	Aleem Miran	753	28.3	–7.7
Reform	Dave West	562	21.1	N/A
Green	Nassim Rhaiem	297	11.2	+3.3
Liberal Democrats	Ian Hardman	111	4.2	–0.9
Majority		186	7.0	–1.7
Turnout		2,662	34.6	+3.1
Registered electors		~7,694		
Labour Co-op hold		Swing	▼0.9	

=== Eye, Thorney & Newborough ===
Eye, Thorney & Newborough
Party	Candidate	Votes	%	±%
Reform	Layton Mills	1,355	43.5	N/A
Conservative	John Peach	1,064	34.2	–1.4
Green	Adam Warr	331	10.6	+4.7
Labour Co-op	Sue Farr	230	7.4	–15.1
Liberal Democrats	Anthony Church	133	4.3	N/A
Majority		291	9.3	N/A
Turnout		3,113	41.6	+9.6
Registered electors		~7,483		
Reform gain from Independent				

=== Fletton & Stanground ===
Fletton & Stanground
Party	Candidate	Votes	%	±%
Liberal Democrats	Christian Hogg*	919	38.9	–13.4
Reform	Maria Pinotes	874	37.0	N/A
Labour	Andrew Johnson	275	11.6	–8.4
Conservative	Neil Seekings	255	10.8	–6.9
TUSC	Jon Lloyd	41	1.7	N/A
Majority		45	1.9	–30.4
Turnout		2,364	32.2	+9.4
Registered electors		~7,342		
Liberal Democrats hold				

=== Fletton & Woodston ===
Fletton & Woodston
Party	Candidate	Votes	%	±%
Green	Ed Murphy	1,007	37.8	▲26.5
Reform	Yvonne Scarrott	714	26.8	N/A
Conservative	Andy Coles	428	16.1	▼17.5
Independent	Steve Harknett	258	9.7	N/A
Labour	Harvey Woodhouse	254	9.5	▼38.6
Majority		293	11.0	N/A
Turnout		2,661	34.5	▲9.2
Registered electors		~7,713		
Green gain from Labour Co-op				

=== Gunthorpe ===
Gunthorpe
Party	Candidate	Votes	%	±%
Liberal Democrats	Andrew Bond*	1,230	45.5	+3.7
Reform	Tom Rogers	912	33.7	N/A
Conservative	Andrew MacFarlane	401	14.8	–25.5
Labour	Muhammad Ahmed	162	6.0	–8.1
Majority		318	11.8	+10.2
Turnout		2,705	39.7	+8.0
Registered electors		~6,814		
Liberal Democrats hold				

=== Hampton Vale ===
Hampton Vale
Party	Candidate	Votes	%	±%
Liberal Democrats	Paul Wiggin	558	33.2	+9.7
Reform	Steve Newson	463	26.1	N/A
Green	Toqeer Sethi	299	16.9	+12.0
Conservative	Marco Cereste*	281	15.9	–8.5
Labour	Simon Turp	170	9.6	–9.5
Majority		95	5.4	N/A
Turnout		1,771	29.3	+4.5
Registered electors		~6,044		
Liberal Democrats gain from Conservative				

=== Hargate & Hempsted ===
Hargate & Hempsted
Party	Candidate	Votes	%	±%
Conservative	Vishal Vichare	674	29.5	+6.4
Reform	Simon Jones	652	28.5	N/A
Green	Katherine Sharp	478	20.9	+14.1
Labour	Hamza Jarral	318	13.9	–6.1
Liberal Democrats	Neil Walton	164	7.2	+2.5
Majority		22	1.0	N/A
Turnout		2,286	29.3	+3.2
Registered electors		~7,802		
Conservative gain from Peterborough First				

=== North ===
North
Party	Candidate	Votes	%	±%
Conservative	Javed Akhtar	812	34.8	+7.4
Labour Co-op	Noreen Bi*	738	31.6	–14.6
Reform	Keith Sharp	421	18.0	N/A
Green	Mohammed Munir	363	15.6	–2.4
Majority		74	3.2	N/A
Turnout		2,334	32.6	+0.6
Registered electors		~7,160		
Conservative gain from Labour Co-op		Swing	▲11.0	

=== Orton Longueville ===
Orton Longueville
Party	Candidate	Votes	%	±%
Reform	Philip Whitworth	775	30.5	N/A
Green	Jonathan Orchard	691	27.2	–3.6
Independent	Nick Penniall	502	19.7	+8.1
Conservative	Ruwen Madugalla	322	12.7	–17.1
Labour	Olu Akinyele	255	10.0	–14.0
Majority		84	3.3	N/A
Turnout		2,545	33.9	
Registered electors		~7,507		
Reform gain from Conservative				

=== Orton Waterville ===
Orton Waterville
Party	Candidate	Votes	%	±%
Green	Alex Bowerbanks	1,187	38.0	▲11.1
Reform	Stephen Arnott	897	28.7	N/A
Independent	Ray Knight	559	17.9	▼30.3
Conservative	Sanjaya Dodamgoda	310	9.9	▼7.0
Labour	Steve Bailey	174	5.6	▼2.4
Majority		290	9.3	N/A
Turnout		3,127	42.7	▲6.5
Registered electors		~7,323		
Green gain from Independent				

=== Park ===
Park
Party	Candidate	Votes	%	±%
Conservative	Murtaza Ahmed-Munir	1,009	35.2	+1.7
Labour	Saif Ali Yasin	655	22.9	–10.7
Green	Tassadaq Hussain	648	22.6	+1.9
Reform	Reza Behravan	315	11.0	+6.5
Liberal Democrats	Beki Sellick	124	4.3	+0.4
Independent	Fiona Radic	115	4.0	+0.2
Majority		354	12.4	N/A
Turnout		2,866	39.4	+5.4
Registered electors		~7,274		
Conservative gain from Labour Co-op				

=== Paston & Walton ===
Paston & Walton
Party	Candidate	Votes	%	±%
Conservative	Iva Banyalieva	1,000	37.8	–2.0
Liberal Democrats	Asif Shaheed*	714	27.0	–12.6
Reform	Ryan Gallagher	666	25.2	N/A
Labour	Mohammed Yasin	186	7.0	–9.4
Your Party	Rob Petch	78	3.0	N/A
Majority		286	10.8	+10.6
Turnout		2,644	35.8	+7.3
Registered electors		~7,385		
Conservative gain from Liberal Democrats		Swing	▲5.3	

=== Raventhorpe ===
Raventhorpe
Party	Candidate	Votes	%	±%
Conservative	Gul Nawaz	1,214	40.5	+5.0
Green	Shokat Ali	699	23.3	–16.0
Reform	Ashli Philip	638	21.3	N/A
Labour	Matthew Clements	329	11.0	–11.5
Liberal Democrats	Nick Sandford	114	3.8	+1.0
Majority		515	17.2	N/A
Turnout		2,994	39.6	+4.7
Registered electors		~7,561		
Conservative gain from Green		Swing	▲10.5	

=== Stanground South ===
Stanground South
Party	Candidate	Votes	%	±%
Reform	Peter Reeve	902	38.3	N/A
Peterborough First	June Bull	450	19.1	–37.1
Conservative	Janet Brown	325	13.8	–5.1
Green	Charles Coster	291	12.4	+7.9
Labour	Andrew Deacon	229	9.7	–10.7
Independent	Julian Bray	80	3.4	N/A
Liberal Democrats	Miriam Sellick	77	3.3	N/A
Majority		452	19.2	N/A
Turnout		2,354	30.5	+5.0
Registered electors		~7,718		
Reform gain from Peterborough First				

In August '26 Cllr Reeve was suspended from Reform after being charged with drink driving.

=== Werrington ===
Werrington
Party	Candidate	Votes	%	±%
Peterborough First	Sarah Hillier*	1,448	46.9	–8.9
Reform	Chris Watson	979	31.7	N/A
Conservative	Ruta Dalton	393	12.7	–8.3
Labour	Bradley Dilloway	265	8.6	–5.5
Majority		469	15.2	N/A
Turnout		3,085	40.7	+6.9
Registered electors		~7,580		
Peterborough First hold				

== Post-election changes ==
=== By-elections ===
==== Fletton & Woodston ====
Fletton & Woodston by-election: 16 July 2026 Resignation of Daisy Blakemore-Creedon (Independent)
Party	Candidate	Votes	%	±%
Green	Katherine Sharp	664	41.2	+3.4
Reform	Ryan Gallagher	479	29.7	+2.9
Labour	Adam Marshall	213	13.2	+3.7
Conservative	Janet Brown	208	12.9	−3.2
Liberal Democrats	Lewis Page	37	2.3	N/A
Your Party	Jonathan Wilde	11	0.7	N/A
Majority		293	11.0	N/A
Turnout		1,612	20.9	–13.6
Registered electors		~7,713		
Green gain from Independent		Swing	▲0.3	
