= 2022 Peterborough City Council election =

Local election in Peterborough, England

- 5 May 2022

19 out of 60 seats to Peterborough City Council 31 seats needed for a majority
	First party	Second party	Third party
Leader	Wayne Fitzgerald	Shaz Nawaz	Nick Sandford
Party	Conservative	Labour	Liberal Democrats
Last election	29 seats, 44.6%	15 seats, 30.6%	8 seats, 10.8%
Seats won	7	6	4
Seats after	28	17	8
Seat change	▼1	▲2	Steady
Popular vote	14,101	13,686	5,270
Percentage	35.8%	34.8%	13.4%
Swing	▼8.8%	▲4.2%	▲2.6%
	Fourth party	Fifth party	Sixth party
Leader	Nicola Day	John Fox	Chris Harper
Party	Green	Werrington First	Independent
Last election	3 seats, 8.4%	3 seats, 3.4%	2 seats, 1.2%
Seats won	1	1	0
Seats after	3	3	1
Seat change	Steady	Steady	▼1
Popular vote	3,671	1,373	864
Percentage	9.3%	3.5%	2.2%
Swing	▲0.9%	0.0%	▲1.0%
- Winner of each seat at the 2022 Peterborough City Council election.
Council control before election
No overall control
Council control after election
No overall control

The 2022 Peterborough City Council election took place on 5 May 2022 to elect members to Peterborough City Council in Cambridgeshire, England. 19 of the 60 seats were contested, including one by-election in Fletton & Stanground ward. The election took place alongside other local elections across the United Kingdom.

== Current political makeup ==
- Conservative: 7 defences (21 other seats)
- Labour and Co-operative: 5 defences (11 other seats)
- Liberal Democrat: 4 defences (4 other seats)
- Werrington First: 1 defence (2 other seats)
- Green: 1 defence (2 other seats)
- Independent Labour: 1 defence (0 other seats)
- Independent: 0 defences (1 other seat)

=== Summary of result ===
2022 Peterborough City Council election
Party	This election				Full council			This election		
Party	Candidates	Seats	Net	Seats %	Other	Total	Total %	Votes	Votes %	+/−
Conservative	19	7	▼1	36.8	21	28	46.7	14,101	35.8	–8.8
Labour	18	6	▲2	31.6	11	17	28.3	13,686	34.8	+4.2
Liberal Democrats	17	4	Steady	21.1	4	8	13.3	5,270	13.4	+2.6
Green	13	1	Steady	5.3	2	3	5.0	3,671	9.3	+0.9
Werrington First	1	1	Steady	5.3	2	3	5.0	1,373	3.5	±0.0
Independent	2	0	▼1	0.0	1	1	1.7	864	2.2	+1.0
Reform	2	0	Steady	0.0	0	0	0.0	258	0.7	N/A
Freedom Alliance	2	0	Steady	0.0	0	0	0.0	99	0.3	–0.1
TUSC	1	0	Steady	0.0	0	0	0.0	52	0.1	N/A

== Ward results ==
=== Bretton ===
Bretton
Party	Candidate	Votes	%	±%
Conservative	Scott Warren	850	44.2	−4.3
Labour	Nick Thulbourn	695	36.1	−4.8
Independent	Dave Craig	248	12.9	N/A
Liberal Democrats	Rohan Wilson	131	6.8	+0.7
Majority		155	8.1	+0.5
Turnout		1,931	27.7	−4.0
Registered electors		6,952		
Conservative hold		Swing	▲0.3	

No For Britain (3.9%) and UKIP (3.4%) candidates as previous.

=== Central ===
Central
Party	Candidate	Votes	%	±%
Labour Co-op	Alison Jones	1,720	57.7	−2.1
Conservative	Aleem Miran	937	31.4	+5.5
Green	Raymond Knight	147	4.9	−0.7
Liberal Democrats	Paul Whittaker	127	4.3	−2.1
TUSC	Steve Cawley	52	1.7	N/A
Majority		783	26.3	−7.6
Turnout		2,983	35.0	−6.1
Registered electors		8,598		
Labour hold		Swing	▼3.8	

No Freedom Alliance (2.4%) candidate as previous.

=== Dogsthorpe ===
Dogsthorpe
Party	Candidate	Votes	%	±%
Labour Co-op	Dennis Jones	1,107	57.4	+22.2
Conservative	Marius Vainauskas	568	29.5	−9.4
Liberal Democrats	Sandra Ringler	140	7.2	+0.2
Green	Kelsey Brace	68	3.5	±0.0
Freedom Alliance	Robert Petch	45	2.3	N/A
Majority		539	27.9	N/A
Turnout		1,936	27.6	−4.8
Registered electors		7,018		
Labour hold		Swing	▲15.8	

No Independent (11.4%) and UKIP (4.0%) candidates as previous.

=== East ===
East
Party	Candidate	Votes	%	±%
Labour Co-op	Sam Hemraj*	990	46.8	+2.5
Conservative	Dominic Pereira	862	40.8	−4.6
Liberal Democrats	Stuart Clark	144	6.8	+1.4
Green	Luke Chapman	118	5.6	+0.7
Majority		128	6.0	N/A
Turnout		2,124	28.7	−4.1
Registered electors		7,404		
Labour Co-op hold		Swing	▲3.6	

=== Eye, Thorney & Newborough ===
Eye, Thorney & Newborough
Party	Candidate	Votes	%	±%
Conservative	Rylan Ray	1,269	56.3	−13.7
Labour	Kim Lewis	549	24.3	+6.2
Green	Michael Alexander	285	12.6	+4.3
Liberal Democrats	Annie Geraghty	152	6.7	+3.1
Majority		720	32.0	−20.0
Turnout		2,255	29.8	−2.7
Registered electors		7,597		
Conservative hold		Swing	▼10.0	

=== Fletton & Stanground ===
Fletton & Stanground (2 seats due to by-election)
Party	Candidate	Votes	%	±%
Liberal Democrats	Christian Hogg*	1,030	49.6	+22.9
Liberal Democrats	Jade Seager	928	44.7	+18.0
Conservative	Irene Walsh	605	29.1	−6.3
Conservative	Vishal Vichare	566	27.3	−8.1
Labour	Asim Mahmood	442	21.3	+1.3
Turnout		2,077	26.5	−0.4
Registered electors		7,463		
Liberal Democrats hold				
Liberal Democrats hold				

No Independent (10.6%) and Green (7.2%) candidates as previous.

=== Fletton & Woodston ===
Fletton & Woodston
Party	Candidate	Votes	%	±%
Labour Co-op	Alan Dowson*	880	43.3	+4.8
Conservative	Andrew Willey	812	39.9	−1.2
Green	David Stevenson	202	9.9	−1.4
Liberal Democrats	Neil Walton	139	6.8	+0.3
Majority		68	3.4	+2.5
Turnout		2,033	26.1	−6.2
Registered electors		7,832		
Labour hold		Swing	▲3.0	

No Freedom Alliance (2.7%) candidate as previous.

=== Gunthorpe ===
Gunthorpe
Party	Candidate	Votes	%	±%
Liberal Democrats	Andrew Bond*	1,259	50.3	+17.6
Conservative	John Peach	996	39.8	−13.7
Labour	Jack Gower	250	10.0	−2.5
Majority		263	10.5	N/A
Turnout		2,511	37.1	−0.7
Registered electors		6,776		
Liberal Democrats hold		Swing	▲15.7	

No Christian Peoples Alliance (1.3%) candidate as previous.

=== Hampton Vale ===
Hampton Vale
Party	Candidate	Votes	%	±%
Conservative	Marco Cereste*	398	37.1	−6.7
Liberal Democrats	Polly Geraghty	291	27.2	−1.9
Labour	Bill Thompson	264	24.6	+2.3
Green	Barry Warne	65	6.1	N/A
Freedom Alliance	Arthurs Fedorovs	54	5.0	N/A
Majority		107	9.9	−4.7
Turnout		1,072	20.7	−1.5
Registered electors		5,225		
Conservative hold		Swing	▼2.4	

No Independent (4.8%) candidate as previous.

=== Hargate & Hempsted ===
Hargate & Hempsted
Party	Candidate	Votes	%	±%
Conservative	Mohammed Farooq*	672	50.0	+2.7
Labour	Timothy Kujiyat	427	31.8	+9.6
Liberal Democrats	Rachel Speed	155	11.5	−10.5
Green	Michael Whitaker	90	6.7	−1.3
Majority		245	18.2	−6.4
Turnout		1,344	21.7	−3.1
Registered electors		6,209		
Conservative hold		Swing	▼3.5	

=== North ===
North
Party	Candidate	Votes	%	±%
Labour	Noreen Bi	1,708	72.4	+14.6
Conservative	Akim Akim	652	27.6	−3.5
Majority		1,056	44.8	+18.1
Turnout		2,360	32.9	−8.0
Registered electors		7,259		
Labour gain from Conservative		Swing	▲9.1	

No Green (5.6%) and Liberal Democrat (5.6%) candidates as previous.

=== Orton Longueville ===
Orton Longueville
Party	Candidate	Votes	%	±%
Conservative	Michael Perkins	823	39.4	−7.4
Labour	Wendy Smith	804	38.5	+9.2
Liberal Democrats	Nick Penniall	241	11.5	+2.1
Green	June Bull	221	10.6	−3.9
Majority		19	0.9	−16.6
Turnout		2,089	27.0	−2.8
Registered electors		7,768		
Conservative hold		Swing	▼8.3	

=== Orton Waterville ===
Orton Waterville ward
Party	Candidate	Votes	%	±%
Green	Julie Howell*	1,907	68.4	+15.8
Conservative	Michael Samways	593	21.3	−12.7
Labour	Henry McKearney	217	7.8	−0.2
Liberal Democrats	Vince Carroll	72	2.6	−0.3
Majority		1,314	47.1	+28.5
Turnout		2,789	38.0	−2.0
Registered electors		7,369		
Green hold		Swing	▲14.3	

A month after contesting the seat, Stevenson (née Howell) resigned from the Green Party to sit as an independent.

=== Park ===
This seat was last contested in 2018. The incumbent (Aasiyah Joseph, Labour) is not seeking re-election.

Park
Party	Candidate	Votes	%	±%
Labour Co-op	Mohammed Sabir	1,504	52.9	+3.3
Conservative	Shazia Bashir	895	31.5	−13.1
Liberal Democrats	Ian Hardman	201	7.1	+1.3
Green	Fiona Radic	128	4.5	N/A
Reform	Sue Morris	116	4.1	N/A
Majority		609	21.4	N/A
Turnout		2,844	39.9	−6.5
Registered electors		7,159		
Labour hold		Swing	▲8.2	

=== Paston & Walton ===
Paston & Walton
Party	Candidate	Votes	%	±%
Liberal Democrats	Asif Shaheed*	895	44.6	−1.7
Conservative	Angie Fenner	505	25.2	−4.4
Labour	Gregory Mickiewicz	374	18.6	−5.6
Reform	Tony Allen	142	7.1	N/A
Green	Amanda Horne	92	4.6	N/A
Majority		390	19.4	+2.7
Turnout		2,008	26.7	−4.4
Registered electors		7,539		
Liberal Democrats hold		Swing	▲9.1	

No UKIP (8.1%) candidate as previous.

=== Ravensthorpe ===
Ravensthorpe
Party	Candidate	Votes	%	±%
Conservative	Mohammed Rangzeb	1,202	43.7	−13.5
Labour Co-op	Mohammed Tokir	775	28.2	−4.4
Independent	Ed Murphy*	615	22.4	N/A
Liberal Democrats	Richard Cham	156	5.7	+0.9
Majority		427	15.5	N/A
Turnout		2,748	35.6	−1.8
Registered electors		7,676		
Conservative gain from Independent		Swing	▲4.6	

The incumbent, Ed Murphy, was suspended by the Labour Party in 2021. He contested this election as an independent candidate.

No Green (5.4%) candidate as previous.

=== Stanground South ===
This seat was last contested in 2018. The incumbent is Ray Bisby (Conservative).

UKIP (5%), Julian Bray (Independent) (4.5%), and The Liberal Democrats (4.3%) did not contest this time.

Stanground South ward
Party	Candidate	Votes	%	±%
Conservative	Ray Bisby	967	56.4	▼2.7
Labour	Timothy William Fish	566	33.0	▲6.7
Green	Stuart Middleton	182	10.6	▲7.8
Majority		401	23.4	▼8.6
Turnout		1,715	22.48	▼5.32
Conservative hold		Swing	▼4.7	

=== Werrington ===
This seat was last contested in 2018. The incumbent is Steve Lane (Werrington First).

UKIP (2.9%) did not contest this time.

Werrington ward
Party	Candidate	Votes	%	±%
Werrington First	Steve Lane	1,373	53.1	▼0.1
Conservative	Hayley Jayne Shelton	495	19.2	▲1.7
Labour	Jason McNally	414	16.0	▲5.1
Green	Georgia Wade	166	6.4	▲2.6
Liberal Democrats	Simon Kail	137	5.3	▼6.3
Majority		878	33.9	▼1.8
Turnout		2,585	32.4	▼1.4
Werrington First hold		Swing	▼0.9	

== Changes 2022–2023 ==
- Julie Stevenson (Orton Waterville) resigned from the Green Party to sit as an independent in June 2022.
