= 2019 Peterborough City Council election =

Local election in Peterborough, England

← 2018	2 May 2019	2021 →

20 seats (out of 60 seats) to Peterborough City Council 31 seats needed for a majority

	First party	Second party	Third party
Party	Conservative	Labour	Liberal Democrats
Last election	31	13	6
Seats before	31	14	5
Seats won	7	7	3
Seats after	28	17	9
Seat change	▼3	▲3	▲3
Popular vote	14,193	12,402	6,747
Percentage	32.3%	27.9%	15.3%
Swing	▼3.4%	▼6.4%	▲4.6%
	Fourth party	Fifth party
Party	Werrington First	Green
Last election	3	1
Seats before	3	1
Seats won	1	1
Seats after	3	2
Seat change	Steady	▲1
Popular vote	2,045	4,642
Percentage	4.7%	10.6%
Swing	▲1.2%	▲3.0%

Elections to Peterborough City Council took place on 2 May 2019. 20 of the 60 seats were contested. This was on the same day as other local elections across the United Kingdom.

== Election result ==
Map showing the winner in each ward for the 2019 Peterborough City Council election

=== Summary ===
Peterborough City Council election, 2019
Party	This election			Full council			This election		
Party	Seats	Net	Seats %	Other	Total	Total %	Votes	Votes %	+/−
Conservative	7	▼4	35.0	21	28	46.6	14,193	32.3	▼3.4
Labour	7	▲3	35.0	10	17	28.3	12,402	27.9	▼6.4
Liberal Democrats	4	▲2	20.0	5	9	15.0	6,747	15.3	▲4.6
Werrington First	1	Steady	5.0	2	3	5.0	2,045	4.7	▲1.2
Green	1	▲1	5.0	1	2	3.3	4,642	10.6	▲3.0
Liberal	0	▼1	0.0	1	1	1.6	—	—	▼1.4
UKIP	0	▼1	0.0	0	0	0.0	3,450	8.1	▼2.1
Independent	0	Steady	0.0	0	0	0.0	331	0.8	▼1.4
SDP	0	Steady	0.0	0	0	0.0	187	0.4	New

Following the election the Conservatives were able to continue to govern, although now in a minority administration with the support of the Werrington First group.

== Ward results ==
=== Bretton ===
Bretton ward, 2 May 2019
Party	Candidate	Votes	%	±%
Conservative	Chris Burbage	705	35.66	+10.8
Labour Co-op	Stuart Martin	683	34.55	+0.4
UKIP	Adam Peart	330	16.69	−8.0
Liberal Democrats	Rohan Wilson	146	7.38	+0.7
Green	Roger Stimson	113	5.72	−3.8
Majority		22	1.11	
Turnout		1,977	29.9	
Conservative gain from Labour Co-op		Swing		

=== Central ===
Central ward, 2 May 2019
Party	Candidate	Votes	%	±%
Labour Co-op	Jamil Mohammed	1,727	55.4	+2.6
Conservative	Khazar Suleman	840	26.9	+9.2
Green	Stephanie Wilson	208	6.7	+3.0
Liberal Democrats	Nick Penniall	184	5.9	+2.0
UKIP	Jeffery Lipscomb	159	5.1	+2.6
Majority		887	28.5	
Turnout		3,118	40.7	
Labour Co-op hold		Swing		

=== Dogsthorpe ===
Dogsthorpe ward, 2 May 2019
Party	Candidate	Votes	%	±%
Labour Co-op	Katia Yurgutene	710	37.5	−12.3
Liberal Democrats	Bella Saltmarsh	652	34.4	New
Independent	Colin Hargreaves	202	10.7	New
Conservative	Hani Mustafa	153	8.1	−5.2
VPP	Alex Savage	96	5.1	New
Green	Carolyn English	80	4.2	+1.2
Majority		58	3.1	N/A
Turnout		1,893	29.0	
Labour Co-op gain from Liberal		Swing		

=== East ===
East ward, 2 May 2019
Party	Candidate	Votes	%	±%
Labour	Shabina Qayyum	1,086	48.3	±0.0
Conservative	Muhammad Ikram	763	33.9	−4.2
Liberal Democrats	Stuart Clark	218	9.7	New
Green	Alex Airey	183	8.1	+5.1
Majority		323	14.4	
Turnout		2,250	32.4	
Labour gain from Conservative		Swing		

=== Eye, Thorney & Newborough ===
Eye, Thorney & Newborough ward, 2 May 2019
Party	Candidate	Votes	%	±%
Conservative	Stephen Allen	1,254	52.8	−1.7
UKIP	Nigel Walls	351	14.8	+5.5
Labour	Wendy Smith	325	13.7	−14.9
SDP	Mary Herdman	187	7.9	New
Green	Michael Alexander	172	7.2	+2.6
Liberal Democrats	Christopher Stow	84	3.5	+0.5
Majority		903	38.0	
Turnout		2,373	33.2	
Conservative hold		Swing		

=== Fletton & Stanground ===
Fletton & Stanground ward, 2 May 2019
Party	Candidate	Votes	%	±%
Liberal Democrats	Terri Haynes	1,030	51.7	+9.2
UKIP	John Whitby	320	16.0	+5.8
Labour	Richard Strangward	259	13.0	−7.7
Conservative	Bryan Tyler	246	12.3	−8.6
Green	Peter Slinger	139	7.0	+3.8
Majority		710	35.7	
Turnout		1,994	28.4	
Liberal Democrats gain from UKIP		Swing		

=== Fletton & Woodston ===
Fletton & Woodston ward, 2 May 2019
Party	Candidate	Votes	%	±%
Conservative	Louise Coles	661	33.9	−9.1
Labour Co-op	Joanne Johnson	590	30.3	−13.3
UKIP	Christopher Chamberlain	299	16.0	New
Green	Paula Martin	210	10.8	−2.5
Liberal Democrats	Nicola Mills	154	7.9	New
Our Nation	Jack Penny	33	1.7	New
Majority		71	1.6	
Turnout		1,947	26.8	
Conservative hold		Swing		

=== Glinton & Castor ===
Glinton & Castor ward, 2 May 2019
Party	Candidate	Votes	%	±%
Conservative	Peter Hiller	1,332	66.7	
Liberal Democrats	Claire Bysshee	254	12.7	
Green	John Guthrie	224	11.2	
Labour	Lorna Richardson	186	9.3	
Majority		1078	54.0	
Turnout		1996	38.5	
Conservative hold		Swing		

=== Gunthorpe ===
Gunthorpe ward, 2 May 2019
Party	Candidate	Votes	%	±%
Liberal Democrats	Sandra Bond	1,051	43.9	−4.8
Conservative	Ruta Dalton	812	33.9	+3.3
UKIP	Peter O'Dell	223	9.3	+5.2
Labour	Julia Davidson	221	9.2	+0.1
Green	Joseph Wells	87	3.6	+1.4
Majority		239	10.0	
Turnout		2,394	37.3	
Liberal Democrats hold		Swing		

=== Hampton Vale ===
Hampton Vale ward, 2 May 2019
Party	Candidate	Votes	%	±%
Liberal Democrats	Chris Wiggin	593	50.4	+38.4
Labour	Waheed Fazal	269	22.9	−6.1
Conservative	Nigel North	252	21.4	−31.1
Green	Daniel Laycock	63	5.4	−1.1
Majority		324	27.5	
Turnout		1,177	25.9	
Liberal Democrats gain from Conservative		Swing		

=== Hargate & Hempsted ===
Hargate & Hempsted ward, 2 May 2019
Party	Candidate	Votes	%	±%
Conservative	John Howard	450	39.3	−9.8
Liberal Democrats	Kevin Tighe	403	35.2	+12.2
Labour	Alexander Hall	203	17.7	−6.7
Green	David Stevenson	89	7.8	+4.3
Majority		47	4.1	
Turnout		1,145	24.1	
Conservative hold		Swing		

=== North ===
North ward, 2 May 2019
Party	Candidate	Votes	%	±%
Labour Co-op	Ansar Ali	1,473	53.1	+11.4
Conservative	Haq Nawaz	786	28.3	−16.2
UKIP	John Myles	276	9.9	+5.1
Liberal Democrats	Sandra Ringler	147	5.3	+1.1
Green	Alison Ambarchian	92	3.3	−1.4
Majority		687	24.8	
Turnout		2774	39.7	
Labour Co-op hold		Swing		

=== Orton Longueville ===
In July 2022, Councillor Skibsted resigned from the Labour Party to join the Green Party.

Orton Longueville ward, 2 May 2019
Party	Candidate	Votes	%	±%
Labour Co-op	Heather Caroline Joy Skibsted	697	31.3	−1.3
Conservative	Gavin Anthony Elsey	666	29.9	−8.0
UKIP	Graham John Whitehead	372	16.7	+2.3
Green	Sharon Bellamy	368	16.5	+8.9
Liberal Democrats	Vincent Carroll	127	5.7	−1.9
Majority		31	1.4	
Turnout		2230	30.1	
Labour Co-op gain from Conservative		Swing		

=== Orton Waterville ===
Orton Waterville ward, 2 May 2019
Party	Candidate	Votes	%	±%
Green	Nicola Day	1,819	64.0	+13.2
Conservative	June Stokes	788	27.7	−10.3
Labour	Janet Armstrong	172	6.1	−2.8
Liberal Democrats	Rory Roberson	61	2.1	−0.2
Majority		1,031	36.3	
Turnout		2,840	39.9	
Green gain from Conservative		Swing		

=== Park ===
Park ward, 2 May 2019
Party	Candidate	Votes	%	±%
Labour	Ikra Yasin	1,473	46.7	−7.1
Conservative	John Peach	1,343	42.6	+3.0
Green	Fiona Radic	184	5.8	+2.5
Liberal Democrats	Ian Hardman	151	4.8	+1.5
Majority		130	4.1	
Turnout		3,151	46.2	
Labour hold		Swing		

=== Paston & Walton ===
Paston & Walton ward, 2 May 2019
Party	Candidate	Votes	%	±%
Liberal Democrats	Simon Barkham	1,032	48.0	+9.8
Labour	Jonas Hopogap Yonga	462	21.5	−8.6
UKIP	Michael Kennedy	333	15.5	+7.4
Conservative	Junaid Bhatti	225	10.5	−8.1
Green	Cherry Beeby	96	4.5	−0.5
Majority		570	26.5	
Turnout		2,148	29.8	
Liberal Democrats hold		Swing		

=== Ravensthorpe ===
Ravensthorpe ward, 2 May 2019
Party	Candidate	Votes	%	±%
Labour Co-op	Lucinda Robinson	1,044	40.7	−5.1
Conservative	Angela Fenner	940	36.6	−8.2
UKIP	Mark Perry	325	12.7	+6.2
Liberal Democrats	Peter Chivall	143	5.6	New
Green	Goran Radic	114	4.4	+1.4
Majority		104	4.1	
Turnout		2,566	34.8	
Labour Co-op gain from Conservative		Swing		

=== Stanground South ===
Stanground South ward, 2 May 2019
Party	Candidate	Votes	%	±%
Conservative	Brian Rush	758	47.0	−12.1
Labour	Susan Johnson	364	22.6	−3.7
UKIP	Samantha Wall	287	17.8	+12.8
Green	Jonathan Phillipson Brown	119	7.4	+4.6
Liberal Democrats	Jade Seager	84	5.2	+2.9
Majority		394	24.4	
Turnout		1,612	24.0	
Conservative hold		Swing		

=== Werrington ===
Werrington
Party	Candidate	Votes	%	±%
Werrington First	Judith Fox	2,045	74.7	+21.4
Conservative	Oliver Allan	316	11.5	−6.0
Labour Co-op	Carole Griffiths	162	5.9	−5.0
Green	Georgia Wade	144	5.3	+1.5
Liberal Democrats	Simon Kail	71	2.6	−9.0
Majority		1729	64.2	
Turnout		2,738	34.8	
Werrington First hold		Swing		

=== West ===
West ward, 2 May 2019
Party	Candidate	Votes	%	±%
Conservative	Wayne Fitzgerald	903	53.9	
Labour	Alan Gasparutti	296	17.7	
UKIP	Darrell Goodliffe	175	10.5	
Liberal Democrats	Emanuelina Coviello	162	9.7	
Green	Barry Warne	138	8.2	
Majority		607	36.2	
Turnout		1674	39.8	
Conservative hold		Swing		
