= Jason Ablewhite =

British politician

Cambridgeshire Police and Crime Commissioner
- In office 12 May 2016 – 11 Nov 2019
- Deputy: Andy Coles (2016–2017); Ray Bisby (2018–2019)
- Preceded by: Graham Bright
- Succeeded by: Ray Bisby (acting)

Personal details
- Born: May 1972 (age 54)
- Party: Conservative

Jason Ablewhite is a British Conservative politician who served as Cambridgeshire Police and Crime Commissioner from 2016 until his resignation in 2019. He was elected to the position in the 2016, succeeding the previous commissioner, Graham Bright. Ablewhite had previously served as Huntingdonshire District Councillor for the ward of St Ives East in 2004, later being selected as leader of the council in 2011.

On 11 November 2019, Ablewhite resigned as commissioner following his referral to the Independent Office for Police Conduct after a complaint from a member of the public alleged that Ablewhite had sent her unsolicited indecent photographs of himself via social media. His deputy, Peterborough councillor Ray Bisby, succeeded him as acting commissioner until the next election in May 2021.

During a police search in 2019, a "small box containing various size spent and live ammunition" was discovered in Ablewhite's house. Ablewhite was already shotgun certificated, however the seized cartridges legally required a separate certificate. Ablewhite claimed to not have had prior knowledge of the ammunition upon questioning, and implied that it could have been placed in his shooting vest before leaving a firing range. No charges were filed against Ablewhite for the ammunition.

Since 2023, Ablewhite has served as a councillor on the Benwick Parish Council, where he sits on the Conduct Committee.
