= Darryl Preston =

British politician

Cambridgeshire Police and Crime Commissioner
- Incumbent
- Assumed office 13 May 2021
- Preceded by: Ray Bisby (acting)

Personal details
- Party: Conservative
- Website: Official website

Darryl Preston is a British Conservative Party politician and former police officer, who currently serves as the Cambridgeshire Police and Crime Commissioner.

== Career ==
=== Police Career ===
Darryl Preston joined the Metropolitan Police (Met) in 1983, serving for approximately a decade in London. He then moved to Cambridgeshire Constabulary - either in 1993 or 1998, according to varying sources - and spent around 20 years policing in the county. During his time there, he served in a wide range of roles, including as a frontline and neighbourhood officer, as well as a detective. His work spanned areas such as homicide, covert units, public order, Diplomatic Protection (notably guarding Margaret Thatcher), public protection, and burglary and homicide squads.

=== Post-Policing Career & PCC Role ===
Darryl Preston retired from active police duty in 2017 and subsequently took on a senior role at the Association of Police and Crime Commissioners (APCC) in Westminster. There, he contributed to shaping national policing policy, leading on key issues such as serious violence, economic crime, sexual offences, forensics and biometrics. His responsibilities included lobbying and chairing All‑Party Parliamentary Groups. In May 2021, he was elected as Police and Crime Commissioner (PCC) for Cambridgeshire, succeeding the interim PCC. His campaign, marked by the hashtag #GetCrimeCut, focused on priorities including increasing officer numbers, reducing crime, improving rural and road safety, and supporting victims. He officially took office on 13 May 2021. In July of that year, he was appointed by the APCC as the national lead for forensics and biometrics - portfolios central to enhancing national policing capabilities.

Preston was re-elected in May 2024 for a second term, formally reaffirming his commitment to integrity, public safety, and community policing by signing the oath and the Code of Ethics. In December 2024, he launched the 2025-28 Police and Crime Plan, which emphasises early intervention, tackling crime and antisocial behaviour (ASB), supporting victims and witnesses, and building public trust, with strategies shaped by local consultation. Under his leadership, Cambridgeshire saw police officer numbers rise to a record 1,732 by March 2024. Significant reductions in crime followed: neighbourhood crime fell by 24%, burglary by 37%, ASB by 30%, knife crime by 25%, and rural crime by 21%, among other achievements.

Political offices
Preceded by Ray Bisby (acting)	Cambridgeshire Police and Crime Commissioner; 2021–present	Incumbent
