= Cambridgeshire Police and Crime Commissioner =

Cambridgeshire and Peterborough Police and Crime Commissioner
- Incumbent; Darryl Preston since 13 May 2021
- Police and crime commissioner of Cambridgeshire Police
- Reports to: Cambridgeshire Police and Crime Panel
- Appointer: Electorate of Cambridgeshire
- Term length: Four years
- Constituting instrument: Police Reform and Social Responsibility Act 2011
- Precursor: Cambridgeshire Police Authority
- Inaugural holder: Graham Bright
- Formation: 22 November 2012
- Deputy: Vacancy
- Salary: £73,300
- Website: www.cambridgeshire-pcc.gov.uk

The Cambridgeshire and Peterborough Police and Crime Commissioner is the police and crime commissioner, an elected official tasked with setting out the way crime is tackled by the Cambridgeshire Constabulary in the English County of Cambridgeshire. The post was created in November 2012, following an election held on 15 November 2012, and replaced the Cambridgeshire Police Authority.

The post was filled by Sir Graham Bright from 2012 to 2016, then by Jason Ablewhite, both of whom represented the Conservative Party. On 11 November 2019, Ablewhite resigned as commissioner following his referral to the Independent Office for Police Conduct after a complaint from a member of the public alleged that Ablewhite had sent her unsolicited indecent photographs of himself via social media. His deputy, Peterborough councillor Ray Bisby, succeeded him as acting commissioner until the next election in May 2021 (postponed from May 2020 due to the COVID-19 pandemic). The 2021 election was won by another Conservative, Darryl Preston. Elections were held under a supplementary vote system until 2024, when the election was held under first-past-the-post rules. Preston secured his re-election by a narrow margin of 2.1% over the Labour candidate, Anna Smith.

== List of Cambridgeshire Police and Crime Commissioners ==
Name	Political party	Dates in office
Sir Graham Bright	Conservative Party	22 November 2012 to 11 May 2016
Jason Ablewhite	Conservative Party	12 May 2016 to 11 November 2019
Ray Bisby (acting)	Conservative Party	27 November 2019 to 12 May 2021
Darryl Preston	Conservative Party	13 May 2021 to present

== Elections ==
Cambridgeshire Commissioner election, 2012
Party	Candidate	1st round		2nd round			1st round votesTransfer votes, 2nd round
Party	Candidate	Total	Of round	Transfers	Total	Of round	1st round votesTransfer votes, 2nd round
Conservative	Sir Graham Bright	23,731	26.8%	7,909	31,640		
Labour	Ed Murphy	17,576	19.8%	7,538	25,114		
UKIP	Paul Bullen	14,504	16.4%				
Independent	Ansar Ali	12,706	14.3%				
Liberal Democrats	Rupert Moss-Eccardt	7,530	8.5%				
English Democrat	Stephen Goldspink	7,219	8.1%				
Independent	Farooq Mohammed	5,337	6%				
Turnout		91,501	15.9%				
Conservative win							

Cambridgeshire Commissioner election, 2016
Party	Candidate	1st round		2nd round			1st round votesTransfer votes, 2nd round
Party	Candidate	Total	Of round	Transfers	Total	Of round	1st round votesTransfer votes, 2nd round
Conservative	Jason David Ablewhite	63,614	36.2%	18,237	81,851		
Labour	Dave Baigent	54,426	31.0%	18,054	72,480		
UKIP	Nick Clarke	29,698	16.9%				
Liberal Democrats	Rupert Moss-Eccardt	27,884	15.8%				
Turnout		175,622	30.56%				
Conservative win							

Cambridgeshire Commissioner election, 2021
Party	Candidate	1st round		2nd round			1st round votesTransfer votes, 2nd round
Party	Candidate	Total	Of round	Transfers	Total	Of round	1st round votesTransfer votes, 2nd round
Conservative	Darryl Preston	99,034	42.9%	15,019	114,053		
Labour	Nicky Massey	72,313	31.3%	29,882	102,195		
Reform	Sue Morris	8,031	3.5%				
Liberal Democrats	Rupert Moss-Eccardt	51,490	22.3%				
Turnout		230,868	37.01%				
Conservative win							

Cambridgeshire Police and Crime Commissioner election, 2024
Party	Candidate	Votes	%	±%
Conservative	Darryl Preston	61,688	38.1%	
Labour	Anna Smith	58,304	36%	
Liberal Democrats	Edna Murphy	41,984	25.9%	

== See also ==
- Andy Coles, former deputy commissioner
- Mayor of Cambridgeshire and Peterborough
