= 2021 Peterborough City Council election =

2021 English local government election

- 6 May 2021

23 out of 60 seats to Peterborough City Council 31 seats needed for a majority
- Registered: 142,843
- Turnout: 48,502 (34.0%)
	First party	Second party	Third party
Leader	John Holdich	Shaz Nawaz	Nick Sandford
Party	Conservative	Labour	Liberal Democrats
Leader's seat	Glinton & Castor	Park	Paston & Walton
Last election	28 seats, 32.3%	17 seats, 27.9%	9 seats, 15.3%
Seats before	28	15	9
Seats won	16	4	1
Seats after	29	15	8
Seat change	▲1	Steady	▼1
Popular vote	22,323	15,299	5,400
Percentage	44.7%	30.6%	10.8%
Swing	▲12.4%	▲2.7%	▼4.5%
	Fourth party	Fifth party	Sixth party
Leader		John Fox
Party	Green	Werrington First	Independent
Leader's seat		Werrington
Last election	2 seats, 10.6%	3 seats, 4.7%	0 seats, 0.8%
Seats before	2	3	0
Seats won	1	1	0
Seats after	3	3	2
Seat change	▲1	Steady	Steady
Popular vote	4,182	1,736	741
Percentage	8.4%	3.5%	1.5%
Swing	▼2.2%	▼1.2%	▲0.7%
	Seventh party
Party	Liberal
Last election	1 seat, 0.0%
Seats before	1
Seats won	0
Seats after	0
Seat change	▼1
Popular vote	Did not stand
Percentage	Did not stand
Swing	N/A
- Winner of each seat at the 2021 Peterborough City Council election.

The 2021 Peterborough City Council election took place on 6 May 2021 to elect members to Peterborough City Council in Cambridgeshire, England. 23 of the 60 seats were contested. The election was held alongside the 2021 Cambridgeshire Police and Crime Commissioner election and the 2021 Cambridgeshire and Peterborough mayoral election.

== Election result ==
2021 Peterborough City Council election
Party	This election				Full council			This election		
Party	Candidates	Seats	Net	Seats %	Other	Total	Total %	Votes	Votes %	+/−
Conservative	23	16	▲1	69.6	13	29	48.3	22,323	44.6	+12.3
Labour	23	4	Steady	17.4	11	15	25.0	15,299	30.6	+2.7
Liberal Democrats	23	1	▼1	4.4	7	8	13.3	5,400	10.8	–4.5
Green	17	1	▲1	4.4	2	3	5.0	4,182	8.4	–2.2
Werrington First	1	1	Steady	4.4	2	3	5.0	1,736	3.5	–1.2
Independent	4	0	Steady	0.0	2	2	3.3	621	1.2	+0.4
UKIP	4	0	Steady	0.0	0	0	0.0	262	0.5	–7.6
Freedom Alliance	3	0	Steady	0.0	0	0	0.0	180	0.4	N/A
CPA	1	0	Steady	0.0	0	0	0.0	31	0.1	N/A
For Britain	1	0	Steady	0.0	0	0	0.0	23	<0.1	N/A
Liberal	0	0	▼1	0.0	0	0	0.0	N/A (Note: Did not stand candidates.)	N/A	N/A

== Ward results ==
(* indicates sitting councillor)

=== Barnack ===
This seat was last contested in 2016.

Barnack
Party	Candidate	Votes	%	±%
Conservative	David Over*	729	63.1	−18.2
Liberal Democrats	Prem Gyani	181	15.7	N/A
Green	Danette O'Hara	127	11.0	N/A
Labour	Noreen Bi	118	10.2	−8.5
Majority		548	47.5	−15.2
Turnout		1,168	42.7	+6.7
Registered electors		2,737		
Conservative hold				

=== Bretton ===
Bretton
Party	Candidate	Votes	%	±%
Conservative	Chaz Fenner	1,030	48.5	+12.8
Labour	Angus Ellis*	868	40.9	+6.3
Liberal Democrats	Rohan Wilson	130	6.1	−1.3
UKIP	Frances Fox	71	3.3	−13.4
For Britain	Chris Heap	23	1.1	N/A
Majority		162	7.6	+4.0
Turnout		2,122	31.7	−1.3
Registered electors		6,764		
Conservative gain from Labour		Swing	▲3.3	

No Green candidate (5.7%) as previous.

=== Central ===
Central
Party	Candidate	Votes	%	±%
Labour	Amjad Iqbal*	2,000	59.8	+4.4
Conservative	Khazar Suleman	866	25.9	−1.0
Liberal Democrats	Olivia Geraghty	213	6.4	+0.5
Green	Fiona Radic	186	5.6	−1.1
Freedom Alliance	Arturs Federovs	81	2.4	N/A
Majority		1,134	33.9	+8.3
Turnout		3,399	41.1	−4.9
Registered electors		8,279		
Labour hold		Swing	▲2.7	

No UKIP candidate (5.1%) as previous.

=== Dogsthorpe ===
Dogsthorpe
Party	Candidate	Votes	%	±%
Conservative	Ishfaq Hussain	856	38.9	+30.8
Labour	Alison Jones	779	35.4	−2.1
Independent	Colin Hargreaves	250	11.4	+0.7
Liberal Democrats	Sandra Ringler	153	6.9	−27.5
UKIP	Graham Whitehead	87	4.0	N/A
Green	Kelsey Brace	77	3.5	−0.7
Majority		77	3.5	N/A
Turnout		2,220	32.4	−3.7
Registered electors		6,863		
Conservative gain from Liberal		Swing	▲16.5	

No VPP candidate (5.1%) as previous.

=== East ===
East
Party	Candidate	Votes	%	±%
Conservative	Jackie Allen	1,055	45.4	+11.5
Labour	Nick Thulbourn	1,029	44.3	−4.0
Liberal Democrats	Stuart Clark	125	5.4	−4.3
Green	Stacey Collins	113	4.9	−3.2
Majority		26	1.1	−7.9
Turnout		2,375	32.8	−2.2
Registered electors		7,233		
Conservative hold		Swing	▲7.8	

=== Eye, Thorney & Newborough ===
Eye, Thorney & Newborough
Party	Candidate	Votes	%	±%
Conservative	Nigel Simons*	1,656	70.0	+17.2
Labour	Emma Goldberg	427	18.1	+4.4
Green	Michael Alexander	197	8.3	+1.1
Liberal Democrats	Annie Geraghty	84	3.6	+0.1
Majority		1,229	52.0	+33.6
Turnout		2,364	32.5	−6.5
Registered electors		7,351		
Conservative hold		Swing	▲6.4	

No UKIP (14.8%) or SDP (7.9%) candidates as previous.

=== Fletton & Stanground ===
Fletton & Stanground
Party	Candidate	Votes	%	±%
Conservative	Oliver Sainsbury	682	35.4	+23.1
Liberal Democrats	Jade Seager	515	26.7	−25.0
Labour	Phill Brentor	386	20.0	+6.5
Independent	John Whitby	205	10.6	+10.6
Green	Raymond Knight	139	7.2	+0.2
Majority		167	8.66	N/A
Turnout		1,960	26.9	−4.1
Registered electors		7,282		
Conservative gain from Liberal Democrats		Swing	▲24.1	

No UKIP (16.6%) candidate as previous.

=== Fletton & Woodston ===
Fletton & Woodston (2 seats due to by-election)
Party	Candidate	Votes	%	±%
Conservative	Andy Coles*	997	45.7	+11.8
Labour	Imtiaz Ali	933	42.8	+12.5
Labour	Lisa Forbes	911	41.8	+11.5
Conservative	Andrew Willey	900	41.3	+7.4
Green	David Stevenson	274	12.6	+1.8
Liberal Democrats	Callum Robertson	157	7.2	−0.7
Liberal Democrats	Neil Walton	122	5.6	−2.3
Freedom Alliance	Christopher Hopgood	65	3.0	N/A
Turnout		2,472	32.4	+4.4
Registered electors		7,641		
Conservative hold				
Labour gain from Conservative				

=== Glinton & Castor ===
Glinton & Castor
Party	Candidate	Votes	%	±%
Conservative	Saqib Farooq	1,471	67.6	+0.9
Liberal Democrats	Claire Bysshe	279	12.8	+0.1
Labour	Stuart Martin	225	10.3	−1.0
Green	Gregor Guthrie	202	9.3	−1.9
Majority		1,192	54.8	+8.3
Turnout		2,215	42.2	+1.2
Registered electors		5,251		
Conservative hold		Swing	▲0.4	

=== Gunthorpe ===
Gunthorpe
Party	Candidate	Votes	%	±%
Conservative	Bryan Tyler	1,277	53.5	+19.6
Liberal Democrats	Simon Kail	780	32.7	−11.2
Labour	Jonas Yonga	297	12.5	+3.3
CPA	Tom Rogers	31	1.3	N/A
Majority		497	20.8	N/A
Turnout		2,385	36.3	−1.7
Registered electors		6,658		
Conservative gain from Labour		Swing	▲15.4	

The incumbent, Darren Fower, was originally elected as a Liberal Democrat, but later defected to Labour. He did not seek re-election. No UKIP (9.3%) or Green (3.6%) candidates as previous.

=== Hampton Vale ===
Hampton Vale
Party	Candidate	Votes	%	±%
Conservative	Lindsay Sharp	473	43.8	+22.4
Liberal Democrats	James Brown	315	29.1	−21.3
Labour	Mohammed Tokir	241	22.3	−0.6
Independent	Dave King	52	4.8	N/A
Majority		158	14.6	N/A
Turnout		1,098	21.1	−4.8
Registered electors		4,963		
Conservative hold		Swing	▲21.9	

No Green (5.4%) candidate as previous.

=== Hargate & Hempsted ===
Hargate & Hempsted
Party	Candidate	Votes	%	±%
Conservative	Nicolle Moyo	664	47.3	+8.0
Liberal Democrats	Kevin Tighe	316	22.5	−12.7
Labour	Timothy Kujiyat	311	22.2	+4.5
Green	Samantha Godley	113	8.0	+0.2
Majority		348	24.8	+20.7
Turnout		1,404	24.5	+0.4
Registered electors		5,790		
Conservative hold		Swing	▲10.4	

=== North ===
North
Party	Candidate	Votes	%	±%
Labour	Mohammed Haseeb	1,667	57.8	+4.7
Conservative	Javed Akhtar	896	31.1	+2.8
Green	Alison Ambarchian	161	5.6	+2.3
Liberal Democrats	Peter Chivall	161	5.6	+0.3
Majority		771	26.7	+1.9
Turnout		2,923	40.9	+1.2
Registered electors		7,150		
Labour gain from Conservative		Swing	▲1.0	

No UKIP (9.9%) candidate as previous.

=== Orton Longueville ===
Orton Longueville
Party	Candidate	Votes	%	±%
Conservative	Graham Casey*	1,037	46.8	+16.9
Labour	Wendy Smith	649	29.3	−2.0
Green	June Bull	321	14.5	−2.0
Liberal Democrats	Nick Penniall	209	9.4	+3.7
Majority		388	17.5	N/A
Turnout		2,216	29.6	−0.5
Registered electors		7,582		
Conservative hold		Swing	▲9.5	

No UKIP (16.7%) candidate as previous.

=== Orton Waterville ===
Orton Waterville
Party	Candidate	Votes	%	±%
Green	Kirsty Knight	1,505	52.6	−11.4
Conservative	Michael Samways	973	34.0	+6.3
Labour	Haydn Robson	228	8.0	+1.9
Liberal Democrats	Vincent Carroll	82	2.9	+0.8
UKIP	Iain McLaughlan	74	2.6	N/A
Majority		532	18.6	−17.7
Turnout		2,896	40.0	+0.1
Registered electors		7,241		
Green gain from Conservative		Swing	▼8.9	

=== Park ===
Park
Party	Candidate	Votes	%	±%
Labour	Shaz Nawaz*	1,481	49.6	+2.9
Conservative	John Peach	1,332	44.6	+2.0
Liberal Democrats	Ian Hardman	173	5.8	+1.0
Majority		149	5.0	+0.9
Turnout		2,986	43.3	−2.9
Registered electors		7,017		
Labour hold		Swing	▲0.5	

No Green (5.8%) candidate as previous.

=== Paston & Walton ===
Paston & Walton
Party	Candidate	Votes	%	±%
Liberal Democrats	Nick Sandford*	981	46.3	−1.7
Conservative	Charles Day	626	29.5	+19.0
Labour	Arthur Webber	512	24.2	+2.7
Majority		355	16.8	−9.7
Turnout		2,119	28.9	−0.9
Registered electors		7,434		
Liberal Democrats hold		Swing	▼10.4	

No UKIP (15.5%) or Green (4.5%) candidates as previous.

=== Ravensthorpe ===
Ravensthorpe
Party	Candidate	Votes	%	±%
Conservative	Gul Nawaz*	1,596	57.2	+20.6
Labour	Natasha Snarey	911	32.6	−8.1
Green	Naz Bibi	150	5.4	+1.0
Liberal Democrats	Richard Cham	135	4.8	−0.8
Majority		685	24.5	N/A
Turnout		2,792	37.5	+2.7
Registered electors		7,532		
Conservative hold		Swing	▲14.4	

No UKIP (12.7%) candidate as previous.

=== Stanground South ===
Stanground South
Party	Candidate	Votes	%	±%
Conservative	Chris Harper*	1,267	64.4	+17.4
Labour	Richard Campbell-Smith	483	24.6	+2.0
Green	Stuart Middleton	131	6.7	−0.7
Liberal Democrats	Simon Garner	85	4.3	−0.9
Majority		784	39.9	+15.5
Turnout		1,966	27.0	+3.0
Registered electors		7,397		
Conservative hold		Swing	▲7.7	

No UKIP (17.8%) candidate as previous.

=== Werrington ===
Werrington
Party	Candidate	Votes	%	±%
Werrington First	John Fox*	1,736	61.2	−13.5
Conservative	Rylan Ray	536	18.9	+7.4
Labour	Matthew Dear	339	11.9	+6.0
Green	Georgia Wade	160	5.6	+0.3
Liberal Democrats	Richard Olive	67	2.4	−0.2
Majority		1,200	42.3	−21.9
Turnout		2,864	36.0	+1.2
Registered electors		7,947		
Werrington First hold		Swing	▼10.5	

=== West ===
West
Party	Candidate	Votes	%	±%
Conservative	Lynne Ayres*	1,009	57.6	+3.7
Labour	Richard Strangward	443	25.3	+7.6
Green	Barry Warne	124	7.1	−1.1
Liberal Democrats	Paul Whittaker	112	6.4	−3.3
Freedom Alliance	Rob Petch	34	1.9	N/A
UKIP	John Myles	30	1.7	−8.8
Majority		566	32.3	−3.9
Turnout		1,752	41.1	+1.3
Registered electors		4,263		
Conservative hold		Swing	▼2.0	

=== Wittering ===
Wittering
Party	Candidate	Votes	%	±%
Conservative	Gavin Elsey	395	49.6	−32.3
Green	Peter Slinger	202	25.3	N/A
Independent	John Stannage	114	14.3	N/A
Labour	Abi Ajoni	61	7.7	−10.4
Liberal Democrats	Darren Wogan	25	3.14	N/A
Majority		193	24.2	−39.6
Turnout		806	32.7	+7.7
Registered electors		2,468		
Conservative hold				

This seat was last contested in 2016.
