= Andy Coles =

English undercover police officer

Andrew Wallace Jardine Coles (born 1960) is an English former police officer and Conservative Party politician, known for his undercover police work in the 1990s and subsequent political career.

== Career ==
Andy Coles joined the Metropolitan Police in 1982, serving until 2012. Between 1991 and 1995, Coles served as an undercover Metropolitan Police officer infiltrating animal rights groups. He used the cover name Andy Davey. Coles wrote a tradecraft manual of the Special Demonstration Squad which advised subsequent undercover officers on managing sexual relationships with those they were targeting and the use of dead children's names as cover identities.

Coles was elected as a member of Peterborough City Council for the Conservative Party in 2015 and he was appointed to the Cabinet of Peterborough City Council to lead Children’s Services. In 2016 he was appointed the deputy to the Cambridgeshire Police and Crime Commissioner, the Conservative Jason Ablewhite.

Following reference to his undercover police work in an autobiography written by his brother Richard Coles, activists uncovered his true identity in 2017. His actions are seen as part of the wider undercover policing relationships scandal. He has been accused of engaging in a sexual relationship while undercover with a 19-year-old woman when he was 32. The woman did not know Coles' real identity. Coles denies this relationship occurred but the Metropolitan Police does not agree with this denial and has said if he was still a police officer he would face a disciplinary hearing. In the Undercover Policing Inquiry, Coles is a core participant; he gave verbal evidence in December 2024.

He resigned as deputy police and crime commissioner in 2017 over the allegations. He remained a councillor until he lost his seat in the 2024 Peterborough City Council election; he was not elected in a May 2025 council by-election.

He was married to Louise, a fellow councillor and former teacher; she died in 2020.
