= Ray Bisby =

British politician from Peterborough

Acting Cambridgeshire Police and Crime Commissioner
- In office 27 November 2019 – 12 May 2021
- Preceded by: Jason Ablewhite
- Succeeded by: Darryl Preston

Peterborough City Councillor for Stanground South
- In office 5 May 2016 – 7 May 2026
- Preceded by: Himself (as councillor for Stanground Central)
- Succeeded by: Peter Reeve

Peterborough City Councillor for Stanground Central
- In office 7 May 2015 – 5 May 2016
- Preceded by: Brian Rush
- Succeeded by: Himself (as councillor for Stanground South)

Personal details
- Party: Peterborough First (since 2023)
- Other political affiliations: Conservative (until 2023)
- Children: 2, Amanda and Muriel

Ray Bisby is a British politician who served as the acting Police and Crime Commissioner for Cambridgeshire until May 2021, being appointed in November 2019 following the resignation of Jason Ablewhite due to allegations of sexual misconduct. He did not run for a full term in the 2021 election, and was succeeded by Darryl Preston. Bisby served as a Councillor on the Peterborough City Council, representing the ward of Stanground South from 2016 until 2026. He had previously represented the ward of Stanground Central. He was a member of the Conservative Party until 2023, when he joined Peterborough First.
