= Peterborough First =

Political party in Peterborough, Cambridgeshire

- Leader: Chris Harper
- Treasurer: Peter Hiller
- Nominating Officer: Neil Boyce
- Founded: 4 March 2016
- Headquarters: 28 West End Road, Peterborough; Cambridgeshire; PE6 9EJ
- Peterborough City Council: 8 / 60

Peterborough First is a localist political party in Peterborough, England, which has been registered with the Electoral Commission since March 2016. The party operates without a formal voting whip, allowing its elected representatives to vote independently based on ward priorities. The group temporarily held the leadership of Peterborough City Council as a minority administration from late 2023 until late 2025. Following the 2026 Peterborough City Council election, the party holds eight seats and serves as a junior partner in a cross-party governing coalition alongside the Labour Party and the Liberal Democrats.

== History ==
The party originated as Werrington First, a group of three independent councillors in Werrington, John Fox, Judy Fox, and Steve Lane, who wanted to support each other.

In December 2021, Chris Harper, a councillor representing the Stanground South ward, defected to the group from the Conservatives, and formed Peterborough First. Harper was elected as the group's leader in May 2022. In May 2023, four Conservative councillors defected to the group, bringing the total number of councillors up to eight. In June 2023, three councillors, Mohammed Farooq and his son Saqib Farooq, and John Howard joined Peterborough First. At the 2024 Peterborough City Council election, the party gained four new seats, bringing them to 14 representatives on the city council. Labour subsequently formed a minority administration, with their group leader Dennis Jones being formally appointed leader of the council at the subsequent annual council meeting on 20 May 2024.

Mohammed Farooq, a former council leader, replaced Harper as group leader in October 2024. Howard defected back to the Conservatives in January 2025. In May 2025, Farooq stepped down as leader and was replaced by Harper. In the May 2026 local elections, the party fielded candidates in two seats of those up for election, winning 1 and maintaining a total presence of 8 councillors on the council.

== Election Results ==
Werrington First Election Results (2016–2023)
Election	Seats Contested	Seats Won	Total Votes
2016	3	3	4,731
2018	1	1	1,420
2019	1	1	2,045
2021	1	1	1,736
2022	1	1	1,373

Peterborough First Election Results
Year	Seats Contested	Seats Won	Total Votes
2023	1	1	1,672
2024	8	8	7,279
2026	2	1	1,898
