= Peterborough City Council =

Local authority in England

Type
- Type: Unitary authority

Leadership
- Mayor: Chris Harper, Peterborough First since 19 May 2026
- Leader: Shabina Qayyum, Labour since 12 September 2025
- Chief Executive: Matthew Gladstone since January 2022

Structure
- Seats: 60 councillors
- Political groups: Administration (26) Labour (10) Liberal Democrats (8) Peterborough First (8) Other parties (34) Conservative (14) Reform (5) Independent (8) Green (7)

Elections
- Voting system: First past the post (elected in thirds)
- Last election: May 2026

Meeting place
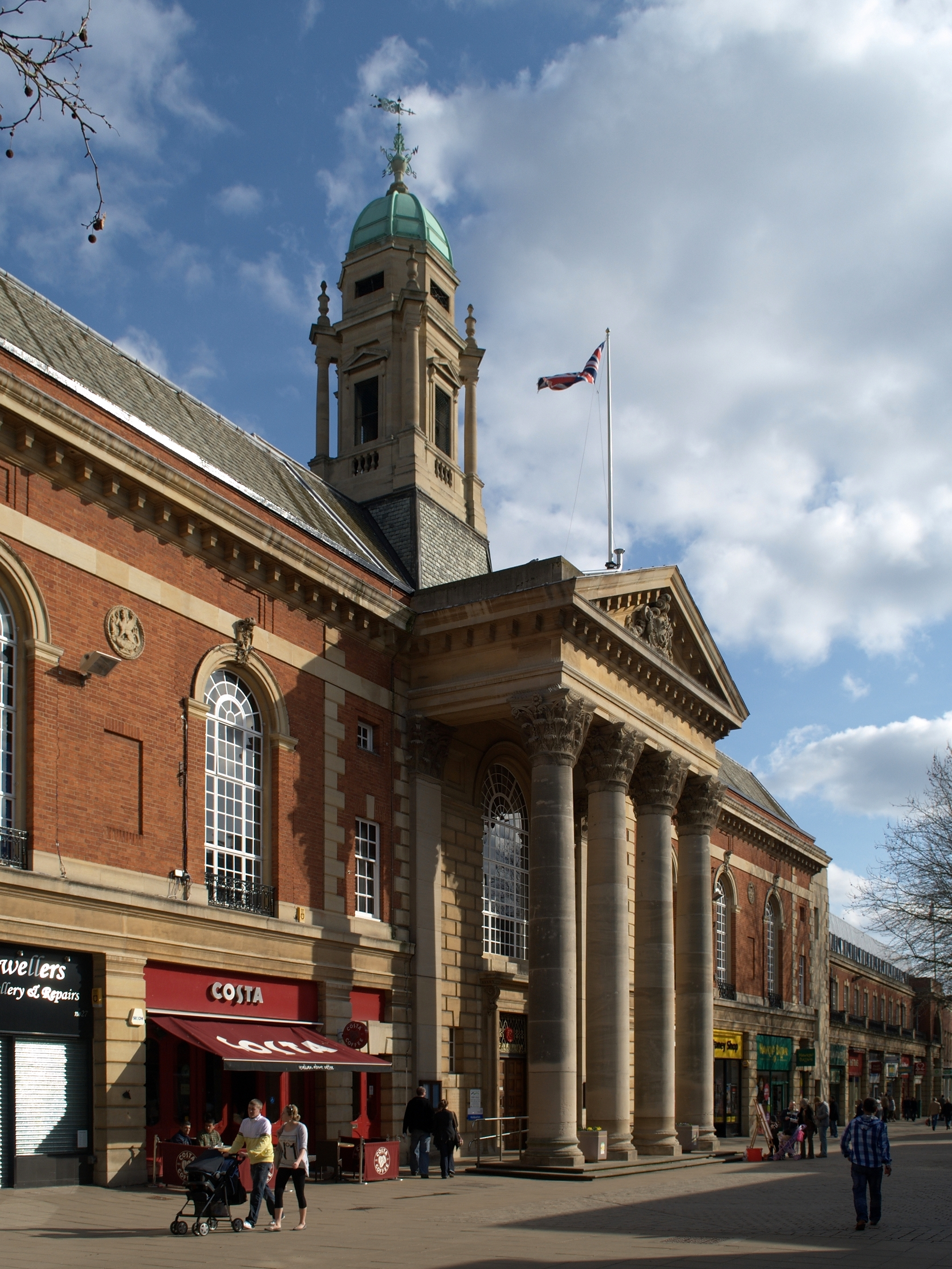
- Town Hall, Bridge Street, Peterborough, PE1 1HF

Website
- www.peterborough.gov.uk

Peterborough City Council is the local authority for Peterborough, a local government district with city status in the ceremonial county of Cambridgeshire, England. Peterborough has had a council since 1874, which has been reformed several times. Since 1998 the council has been a unitary authority, being a district council which also performs the functions of a county council. Since 2017 the council has been a member of the Cambridgeshire and Peterborough Combined Authority.

The council has been under no overall control since 2019. Following the 2026 election a Labour, Liberal Democrat and Peterborough First coaliation runs the council. The council meets at Peterborough Town Hall and has its main offices at Sand Martin House on Bittern Way.

== History ==
Although long-established as a settlement, Peterborough was not an ancient borough. It was made a city in 1541 following the elevation of the former St Peter's Abbey to become Peterborough Cathedral. In the same year it also became a parliamentary borough (constituency), but it had no borough corporation to administer the city itself. As originally constituted, both the city and the constituency covered the township of Peterborough and the extra-parochial area of the Minster Precincts around the cathedral, but did not include the hamlets of Dogsthorpe, Eastfield, Longthorpe, and Newark which made up the rest of the wider ancient parish of Peterborough.

In 1790 a body of improvement commissioners was established to provide public services in the city.

The constituency was enlarged in 1832 to include the whole parish of Peterborough. It was extended again in 1868 to include the more built-up parts of the parishes of Fletton and Woodston which lay on the south side of the River Nene in Huntingdonshire, unlike the rest of the constituency north of the river, which at that time was part of Northamptonshire.

=== Incorporation ===
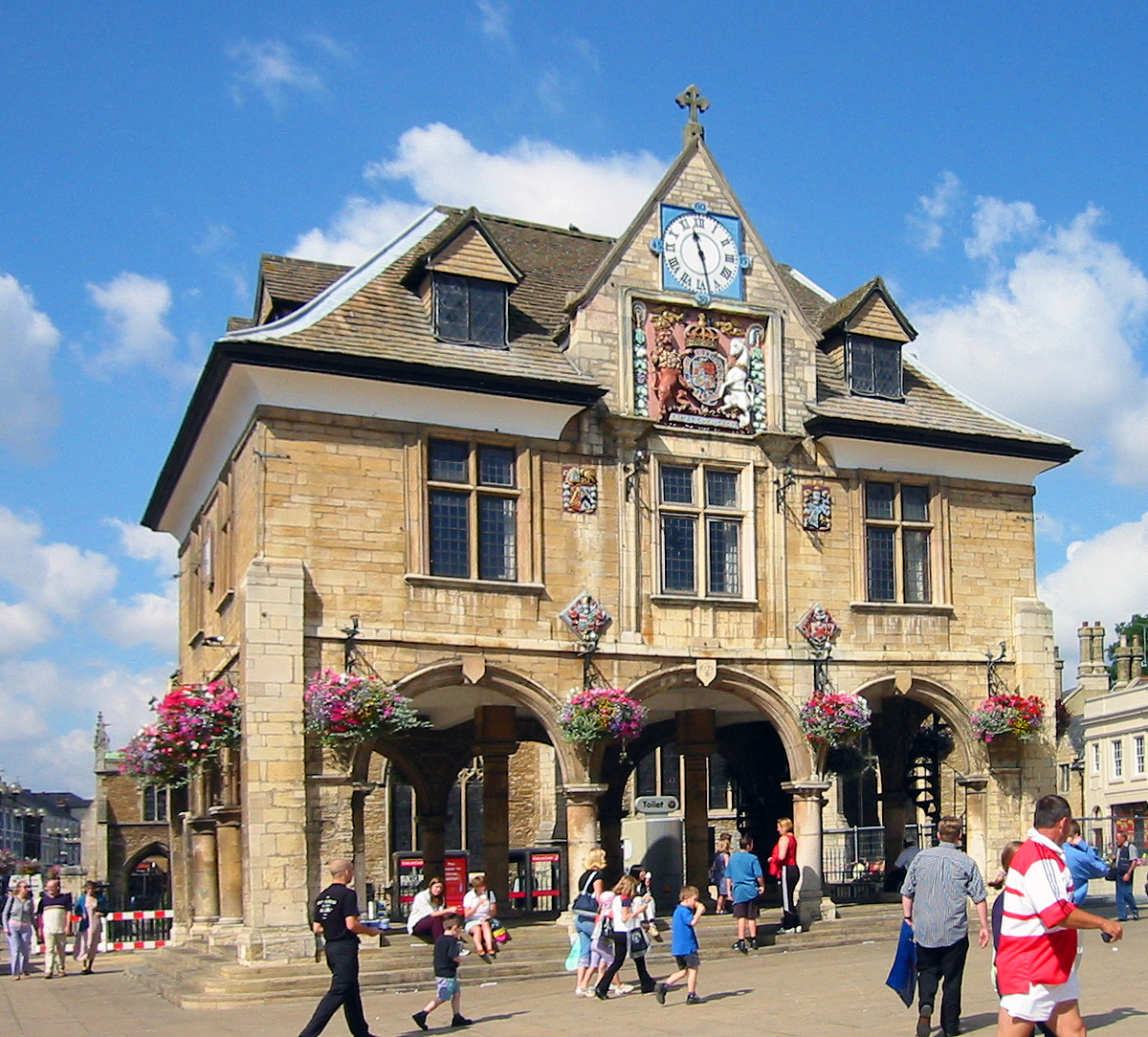
Guildhall: Council's meeting place 1874–1933

A public inquiry was held in 1873 into whether Peterborough should be formally incorporated to become a municipal borough, with a council to take over the functions of the commissioners and other local government functions. Supporters of incorporation argued that the whole constituency should be incorporated, but it was held that outlying parts of the parish of Peterborough remained too rural for including in a municipal borough.

On 17 March 1874 a charter of incorporation was issued, incorporating as a borough the central part of the parish of Peterborough, the Minster Precincts, and the parts of Fletton and Woodston that lay within the constituency. The borough was then administered by a body formally called the "mayor, aldermen, citizens, and burgesses of the city and borough of Peterborough", generally known as the corporation. It initially comprised a mayor, six aldermen and 18 councillors.

=== Watch committee ===
The new corporation was required to appoint a Watch Committee and a police force under the provisions of the County and Borough Police Act 1856. In 1947, the City of Peterborough Constabulary amalgamated with the Liberty of Peterborough Constabulary, which had shared its chief constable with Northamptonshire until 1931 and Peterborough thereafter, to form the Peterborough Combined Police force. This, in turn, merged into Mid-Anglia Constabulary in 1965 and was renamed Cambridgeshire Constabulary in 1974. The Fire Brigades Act 1938 (1 & 2 Geo. 6. c. 72) made it a requirement for the corporation to maintain a fire brigade; under the Fire Services Act 1947 this function passed to the councils of counties.

=== Relationship to county councils pre-1974 ===
Elected county councils were created in 1889 under the Local Government Act 1888, taking over administrative functions previously exercised by magistrates at the quarter sessions. The Soke of Peterborough had long held its quarter sessions separately from the rest of Northamptonshire, and so it was made an administrative county with its own county council, whilst remaining part of the geographical county of Northamptonshire for judicial and lieutenancy purposes. The 1888 Act also said that boroughs could no longer straddle county boundaries, and so the parts of the borough south of the River Nene were transferred from Huntingdonshire to the Soke of Peterborough and Northamptonshire.

The Soke of Peterborough was unusually small for an administrative county, and the borough of Peterborough contained the majority of its population; in 1911 the borough had over 75% of the population of the administrative county. The city and county councils developed a close working relationship, notably working together to build a shared headquarters at Peterborough Town Hall, completed in 1933.

In 1965 the Soke of Peterborough was merged with Huntingdonshire to form the new county of Huntingdon and Peterborough.

=== Expansion ===
In 1929 the borough boundaries were enlarged to include Gunthorpe, Longthorpe, Paston, Walton, Werrington and the area north-east of Fengate (the latter area and Longthorpe having been the parts of the old parish of Peterborough excluded from the borough on its creation in 1874). As part of the 1929 reforms the council's formal name was changed to the "mayor, aldermen and citizens of the city of Peterborough" and the corporation thereafter generally became known as the city council.

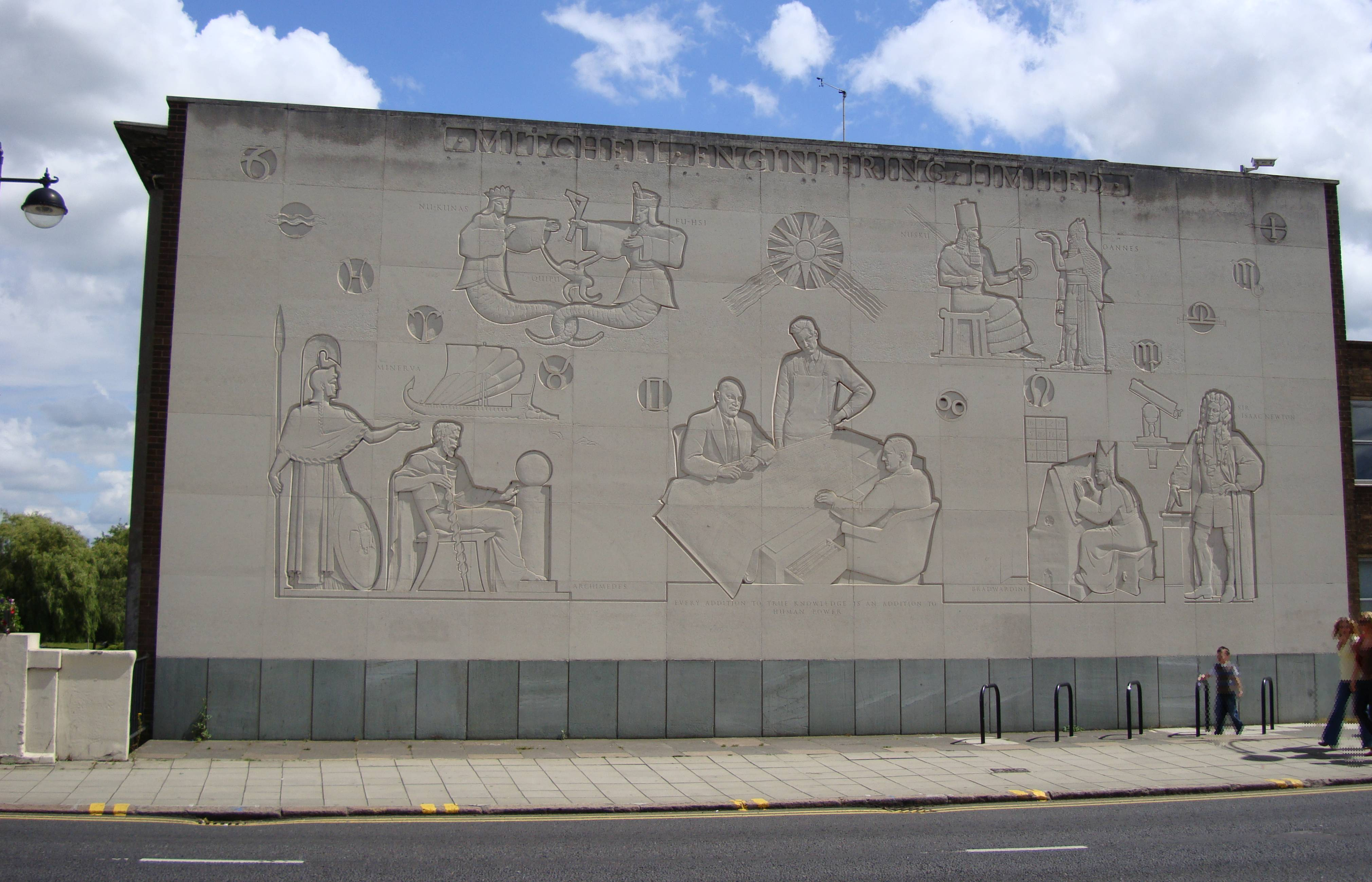
Sunken relief by sculptor Arthur Ayres for Mitchell Engineering Limited at Bridge House, later in use by the city council.

In 1967 Peterborough was designated a new town and plans were drawn up for the city's significant expansion. The designated area for the new town extended beyond the borough, including parts of all the surrounding districts. A development corporation was set up as a separate body from the council to oversee the delivery of the new town.

=== Post-1974 district ===
The modern non-metropolitan district of Peterborough was created in 1974 under the Local Government Act 1972, covering the whole area of five former districts and part of a sixth, all of which were abolished at the same time:

- Barnack Rural District
- Norman Cross Rural District (parts within designated area for Peterborough New Town only)
- Old Fletton Urban District
- Peterborough Municipal Borough
- Peterborough Rural District
- Thorney Rural District

The new district was larger than the pre-1965 Soke of Peterborough, which had just comprised the borough of Peterborough and the two rural districts of Barnack and Peterborough. Prior to 1965, the Norman Cross and Old Fletton districts had been in Huntingdonshire, and the Thorney district had been in the Isle of Ely. The new district was named 'Peterborough' after its main settlement.

The new Peterborough district was granted borough status from its creation, allowing the chair of the council to take the title of mayor, continuing Peterborough's series of mayors dating back to 1874. Peterborough's city status was also transferred to the new district, allowing the council to take the name Peterborough City Council.

As part of the same reforms, the county of Huntingdon and Peterborough was abolished, merging with Cambridgeshire and Isle of Ely (another short-lived administrative county created in 1965) to form the new non-metropolitan county of Cambridgeshire. Following the 1974 reforms, Peterborough City Council was therefore a lower-tier authority, with Cambridgeshire County Council providing county-level services.

=== Unitary authority ===
In 1998, Peterborough City Council gained responsibility for county-level services. The way this change was legally implemented was to create a new non-metropolitan county of Peterborough covering the same area as the existing district, but with no separate county council; instead the existing city council took on county functions, making it a unitary authority. Despite having been removed from the non-metropolitan county of Cambridgeshire, the city remains part of the wider ceremonial county of Cambridgeshire for the purposes of lieutenancy and shrievalty.

Policing in the city remains the responsibility of Cambridgeshire Constabulary. The police authority comprises 17 members, including nine councillors, of which seven are nominated by Cambridgeshire county council and two are nominated by Peterborough city council. Firefighting remains the responsibility of Cambridgeshire Fire and Rescue Service. The joint fire authority comprises 17 elected councillors, 13 from Cambridgeshire county council and four from Peterborough city council. Nowadays the Peterborough Volunteer Fire Brigade, one of few of its kind, effectively functions as a retained fire station, responding to calls as directed by Cambridgeshire Fire and Rescue Service.

A combined authority was established in 2017 covering Peterborough and the rest of Cambridgeshire, called the Cambridgeshire and Peterborough Combined Authority. It is led by the directly elected Mayor of Cambridgeshire and Peterborough.

== Governance ==
Peterborough City Council provides both district-level and county-level functions. Parts of the district (generally the rural areas and outer suburbs of Peterborough) are covered by civil parishes, which form a second tier of local government for their areas. Much of the Peterborough urban area is unparished.

=== Political control ===
The council has been under no overall control since 2019. Following the 2024 election, Labour were the largest party and subsequently formed a minority administration, holding all the seat on the council's cabinet.

Political control of the council since the 1974 reforms took effect has been as follows:

Lower tier non-metropolitan district

Party in control	Years
Labour	1974–1976
Conservative	1976–1978
No overall control	1978–1980
Labour	1980–1982
No overall control	1982–1996
Labour	1996–1997
No overall control	1997–1998

Unitary authority

Party in control	Years
No overall control	1998–2002
Conservative	2002–2014
No overall control	2014–2016
Conservative	2016–2017
No overall control	2017–2018
Conservative	2018–2018
No overall control	2018–2018
Conservative	2018–2019
No overall control	2019–present

=== Leadership ===
The role of Mayor of Peterborough is largely ceremonial, usually being held by a different councillor each year. Political leadership is instead provided by the leader of the council. The leaders since 1999 have been:

Councillor	Party	From	To
Cathy Weaver	Labour		1999
Neville Sanders	Conservative	1999	25 Jun 2003
Ben Franklin	Conservative	25 Jun 2003	4 Apr 2006
John Peach	Conservative	22 May 2006	May 2009
Marco Cereste	Conservative	18 May 2009	May 2015
John Holdich	Conservative	15 May 2015	May 2021
Wayne Fitzgerald	Conservative	26 May 2021	1 Nov 2023
Mohammed Farooq	Peterborough First	1 Nov 2023	May 2024
Dennis Jones	Labour	20 May 2024	4 Sep 2025
Shabina Qayyum	Labour	12 Sep 2025	to date

=== Composition ===
Following the 2024 election, and subsequent changes of allegiance and by-elections up to July 2026, the composition of the council was:

Party	Seats
Labour	10
Liberal Democrats	8
Peterborough First	8
Conservative	14
Reform	5
Independent	8
Green	7
Total	60

The next regular election is due in May 2027.

== Elections ==
Since the last boundary changes in 2016, the council has comprised 60 councillors representing 22 wards, with each ward electing one, two or three councillors. Elections are held three years out of every four, with roughly a third of the council elected each time for a four-year term of office. The wards are:

- Barnack
- Bretton
- Central
- Dogsthorpe
- East
- Eye, Thorney & Newborough
- Fletton & Stanground
- Fletton & Woodston
- Glinton & Castor
- Gunthorpe
- Hampton Vale
- Hargate and Hempsted
- North
- Orton Longueville
- Orton Waterville
- Park
- Paston & Walton
- Ravensthorpe
- Stanground South
- Werrington
- West
- Wittering

== Premises ==
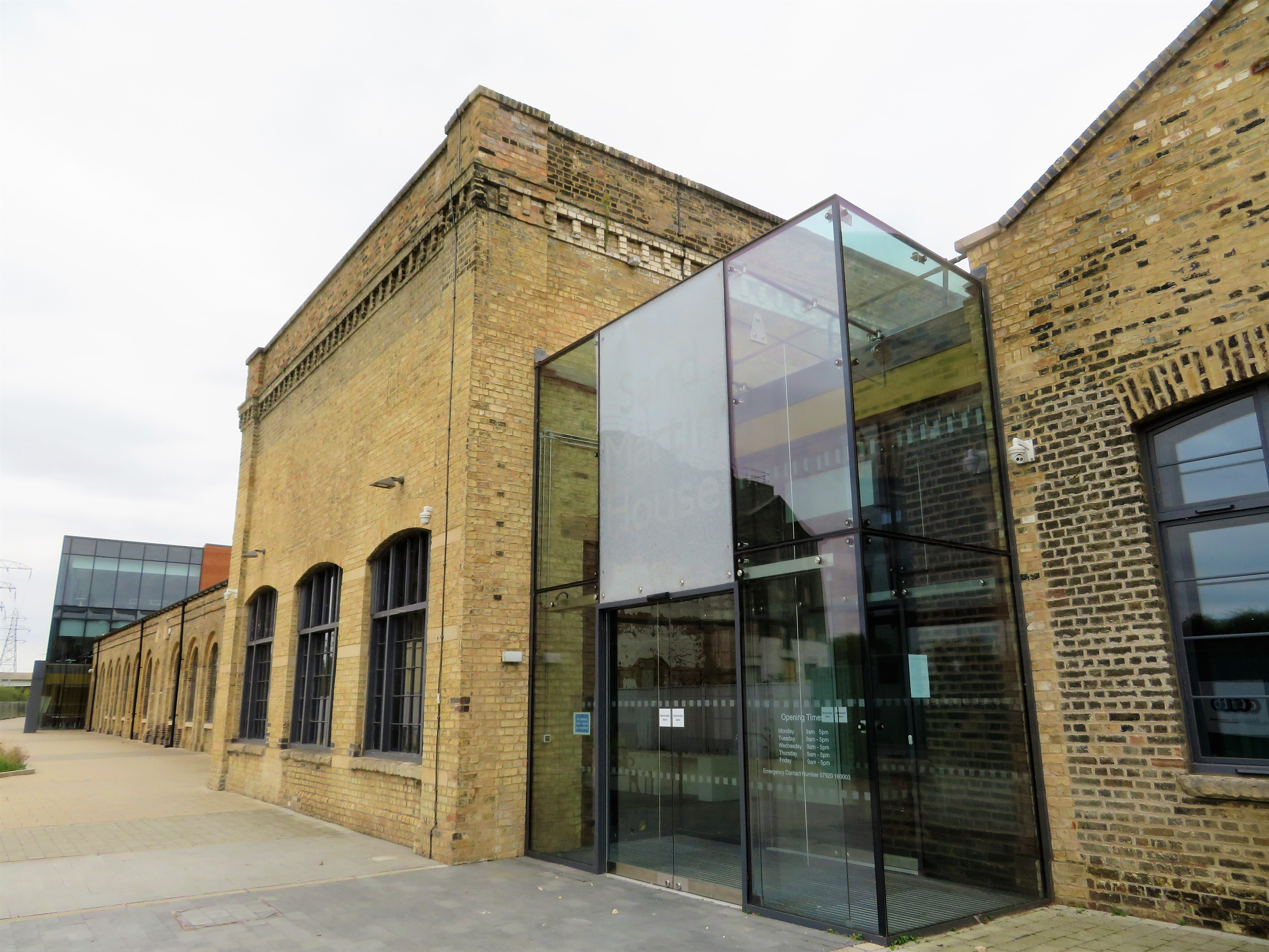
Sand Martin House, Bittern Way, Peterborough, PE2 8TY: Council's main offices since 2018

The improvement commissioners who preceded the city council met at a board room on Westgate. When the council was formed in 1874 it chose to hold its meetings at the city's Guildhall, which had been built in 1671 in the Market Place (renamed Cathedral Square in 1963). The council's offices were spread across numerous locations.

The council's desire to widen Narrow Bridge Street and its need for a new Town Hall came together in a combined scheme, resulting in the building of the present Town Hall. It was opened in 1933 and accommodated both the city council and the Soke of Peterborough County Council.

In 2018 the council moved most of its staff from the Town Hall and other premises to modern facilities at Sand Martin House, a refurbished and extended Victorian railway building at Fletton Quays on the south side of the River Nene. Council meetings continue to be held at the Town Hall.

== Mayors ==
Arms of the Mayor, Aldermen and Citizens of the City of Peterborough, used from 1874 to 1960.

The city council elects a mayor to serve for a term of one year. The mayor has social and legal precedence in all places within the city unless the monarch or their personal representative, a close member of the Royal Family or the lord lieutenant is present. The mayor also chairs meetings of the council. The mayor is expected to be politically impartial, although they are given an additional casting vote in the event of a tie. The mayors since the council became a unitary authority have been:

- 1998–1999 Mary Beatrice Rainey
- 1999–2000 John Ernest Graham Bartlett
- 2000–2002 Raymond Arthur Pobgee
- 2002–2003 Clifford Stanley Horace Sneesby
- 2003–2004 David Raines
- 2004–2005 Raja Akhtar
- 2005–2005 John Ray Horrell (Note: Died in post.)
- 2006–2006 David Thorpe
- 2006–2007 Michael Burton
- 2007–2008 Marion Yvonne Todd
- 2008–2009 Patricia Nash
- 2009–2010 Irene Walsh
- 2010–2011 Keith Sharp
- 2011–2012 Paula Thacker
- 2012–2013 George Simons
- 2013–2014 June Stokes
- 2014–2015 David Over
- 2015–2016 John Peach
- 2016–2017 David Sanders
- 2017–2018 John Fox
- 2018–2019 Chris Ash
- 2019–2021 Gul Nawaz
- 2021-2022 Stephen Lane
- 2022-2023 Alan Dowson
- 2023-2024 Nick Sandford
- 2024-2025 Marco Cereste
- 2025-2026 Judy Fox
- 2026-2027 Chris Harper

== Arms ==
Coat of arms of Peterborough City Council
Notes Granted 6 September 1960 Coronet A mural crown of six towers Gold. Escutcheon Azure two keys in saltire Or enfiled by a mural crown Argent. Supporters On either side a lion Ermine winged Argent charged on the wing with three estoiles Sable the interior paw resting on a tree trunk fesswise Proper. Motto Upon this rock

== See also ==
- Lord Lieutenant of Cambridgeshire
- High Sheriff of Cambridgeshire
