= Mid-Anglia Constabulary =

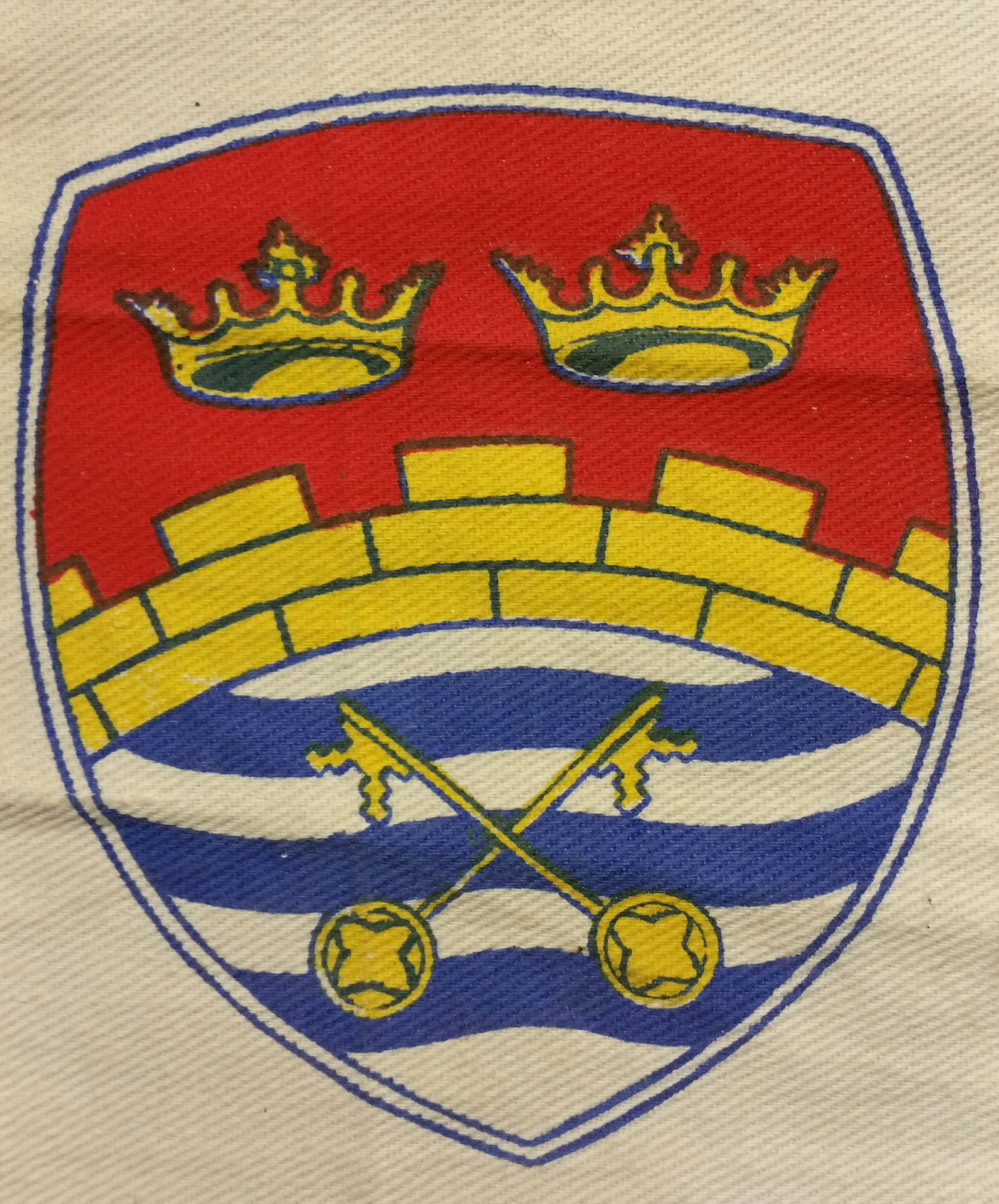
- Mid-Anglia Constabulary arms

Agency overview
- Formed: 1 April 1965
- Preceding agencies: Peterborough Combined Police; Cambridge City Police; Huntingdonshire Constabulary; Isle of Ely Constabulary; Cambridgeshire Constabulary

Jurisdictional structure
- Operations jurisdiction: England, UK
- Legal jurisdiction: England & Wales
- Constituting instrument: County and Borough Police Act 1856
- General nature: Local civilian police

Operational structure
- Headquarters: The Manor, Brampton, Huntingdon
- Agency executive: Frederick Drayton Porter 1965–1974, Chief Constable
- Area Commands: Cambridgeshire & Huntingdonshire

The Mid-Anglia Constabulary was the territorial police force responsible for law enforcement in part of the East of England, from 1965 to 1974. It was created from the amalgamation of five forces. It was renamed Cambridgeshire Constabulary in 1974.

== History: 1965–1974 ==
On 1 April 1965, the former Cambridgeshire Constabulary amalgamated with Cambridge City Police (called Cambridge Borough Police until 1951), Isle of Ely Constabulary, Huntingdonshire Constabulary, and the Peterborough Combined Police (created in 1947 from a merger of the Liberty of Peterborough Constabulary and the Peterborough City Police) to form the Mid-Anglia Constabulary, with the same boundaries as the current force. This force initially had an establishment of 805 and an actual strength of 728. A separate Wisbech Borough Police had already merged with the Isle of Ely Constabulary in 1889.

== Coat of arms ==
The Mid Anglia Police Authority were granted armorial bearings by letters patent dated 20 December 1965. These were blazoned as follows: 'Per fess gules and argent, a fess enarched and embattled or, masoned sable, between in chief two open crowns or and in base three bars wavy azure and thereon two keys in saltire or.'

== Chief Constable of Mid-Anglia Constabulary ==
- 1965–1974 Frederick Drayton Porter OBE, QPM. Formerly the chief constable of Cambridgeshire and Cambridge City.
Badges of the Mid-Anglia Constabulary 1965–1974.
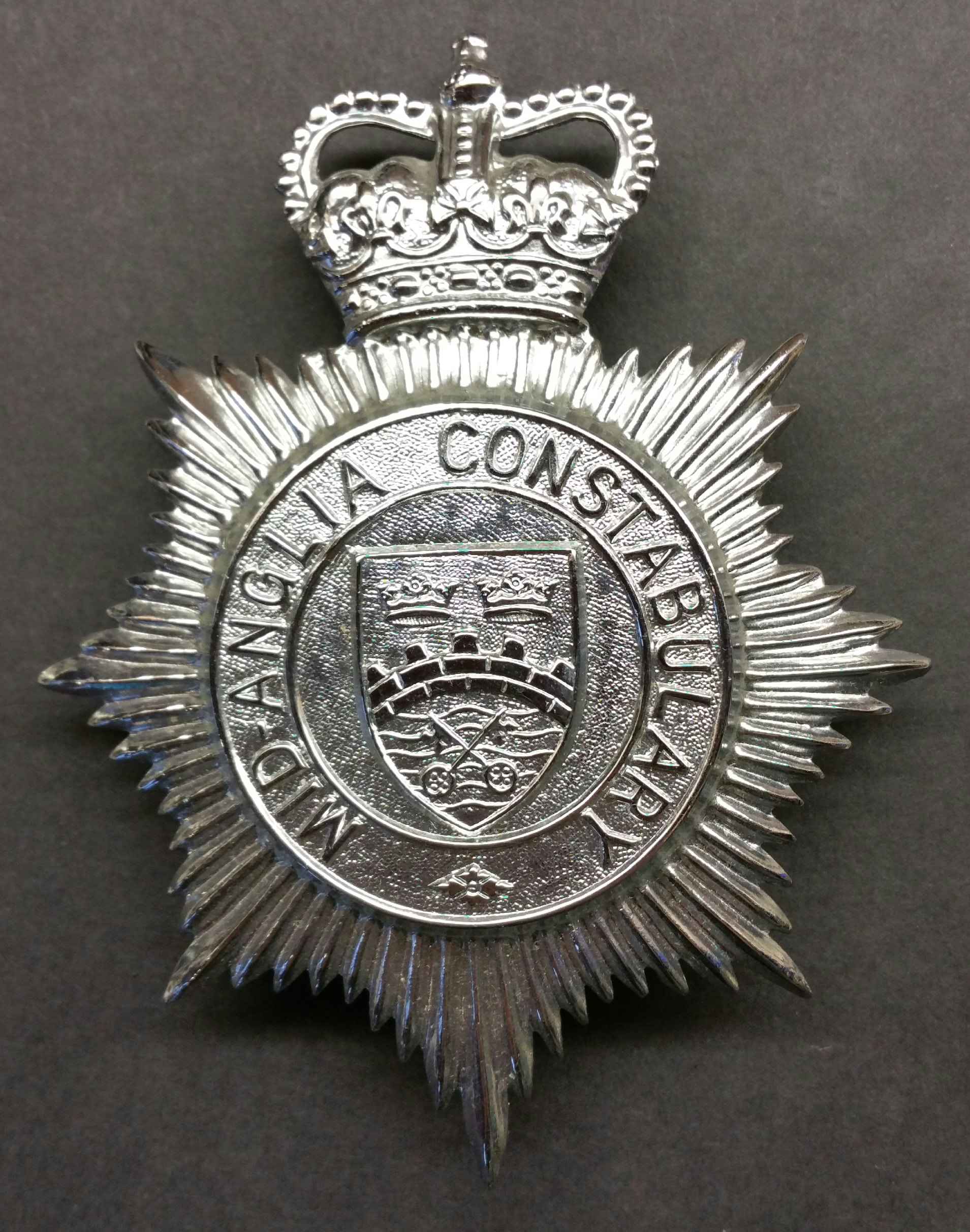
Mid-Anglia Constabulary Helmet Badge

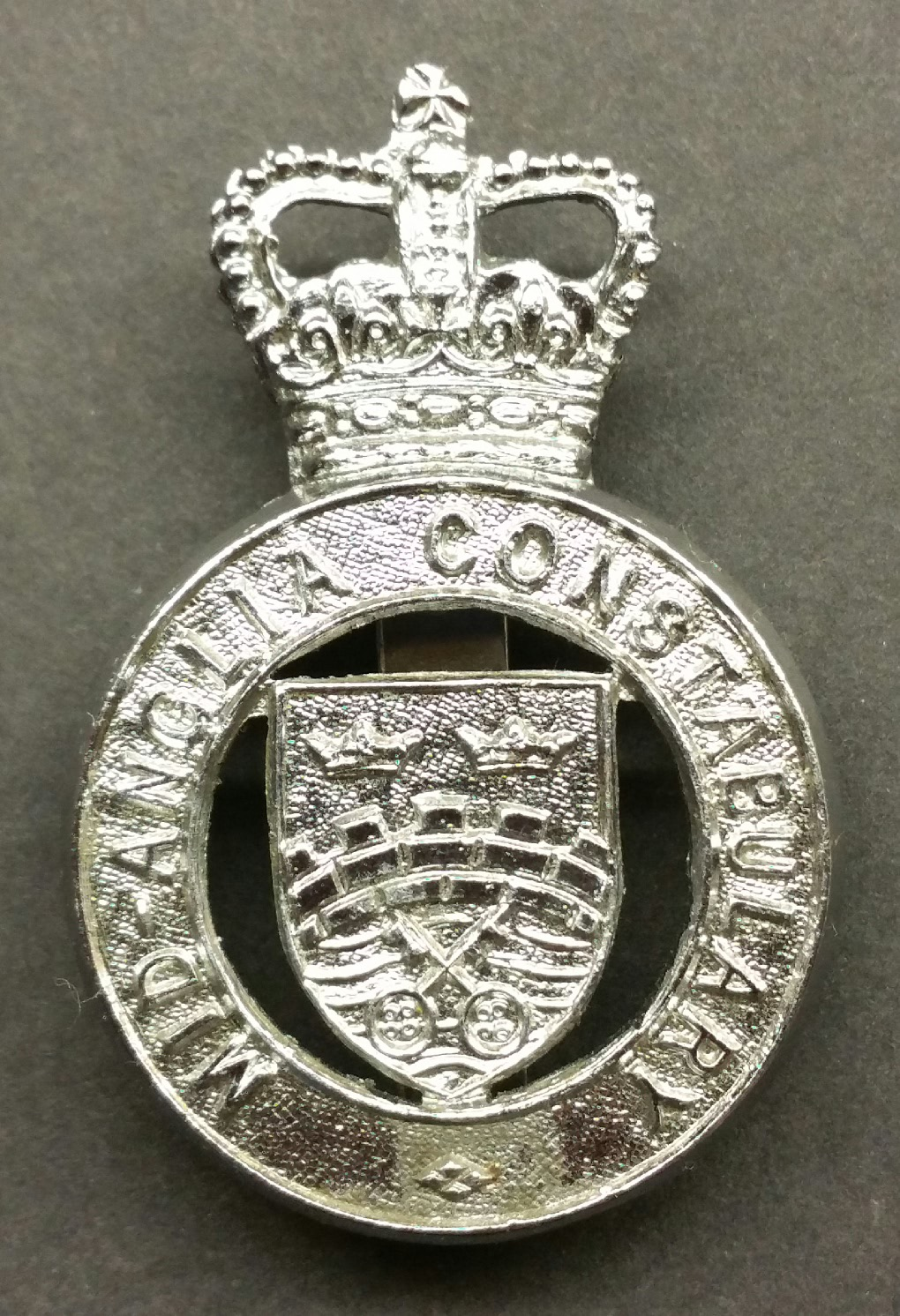
Mid-Anglia Constabulary (early) Cap Badge

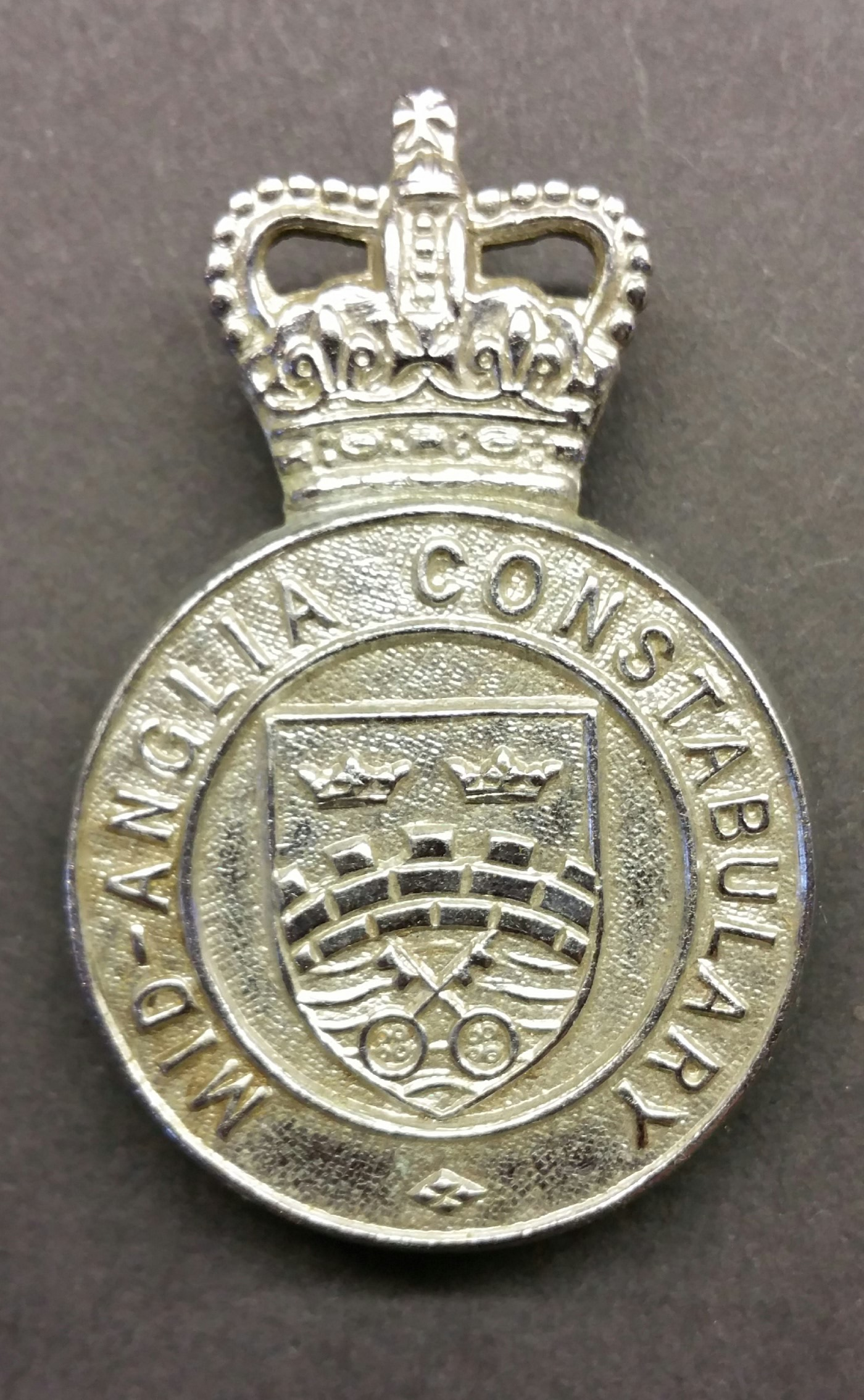
Mid-Anglia Constabulary Cap Badge

== See also ==
- Policing in the United Kingdom
