= Liberty of Peterborough Constabulary =

1856–1947 territorial police force in Soke of Peterborough, England

Agency overview
- Formed: 10 March 1857; 169 years ago
- Preceding agency: Liberty of Peterborough Constabulary
- Dissolved: 1 April 1947; 79 years ago

Jurisdictional structure
- Operations jurisdiction: Peterborough, England, UK
- Legal jurisdiction: England & Wales
- Constituting instrument: County and Borough Police Act 1856
- General nature: Local civilian police

Operational structure
- Headquarters: Sessions House, Peterborough
- Agency executive: Francis George Markin, Chief Constable
- Area Commands: Peterborough

The Liberty of Peterborough Constabulary was the territorial police force responsible for law enforcement surrounding 'The Soke of Peterborough', England, from 1856 to 1947. It was initially controlled by the Chief Constable of Northamptonshire Captain Henry Lambert Bayly 1857 - 1876. The constabulary had its headquarters in the old gaol behind the Sessions House on Thorpe Road in Peterborough.

== History ==
=== 1856–1947 ===
Following the passing of the County and Borough Police Act 1856, the Liberty of Peterborough Constabulary was formed the following year on 10 March 1857. Later, in 1874, a Charter of Incorporation was granted to the City of Peterborough, prompting the council to form a Watch Committee along with the Peterborough City Police.

Until 1947, the constabulary only officially used one helmet plate design, a day and a night plate, see photographs. In 1934, when flat caps were issued for officers assigned to motor patrols, the constabulary had some early badges chromed to save on purchase costs of new badges. However, it is thought that only three chromed badges were produced. The day badge (photographed), is one such chromed badge. It is also known that when Liberty badges were in short supply due to breakages, wear and tear, then identical Northamptonshire badges were used as these were in plentiful supply. At that time Peterborough and the Soke were still within the county of Northamptonshire.

In 1914, the Constabulary had its own Special Constables but very little is known about this; only a badge exists, and it is only by the design of the badge that dating can be made.

These two forces, the Liberty of Peterborough Constabulary and the Peterborough City Police were combined on 1 April 1947 to form the Peterborough Combined Police Force.

=== 1947–1965 ===
On 31 March 1965, five police forces in the Cambridgeshire area, the Peterborough Combined Police, Cambridge City Police, Cambridgeshire Constabulary, Huntingdonshire Constabulary and Isle of Ely Constabulary were amalgamated to form the Mid-Anglia Constabulary, headquartered in Brampton. The name changed again on 31 March 1974 to form today's Cambridgeshire Constabulary following alterations to the county boundaries.

Badges of The Liberty of Peterborough Constabulary
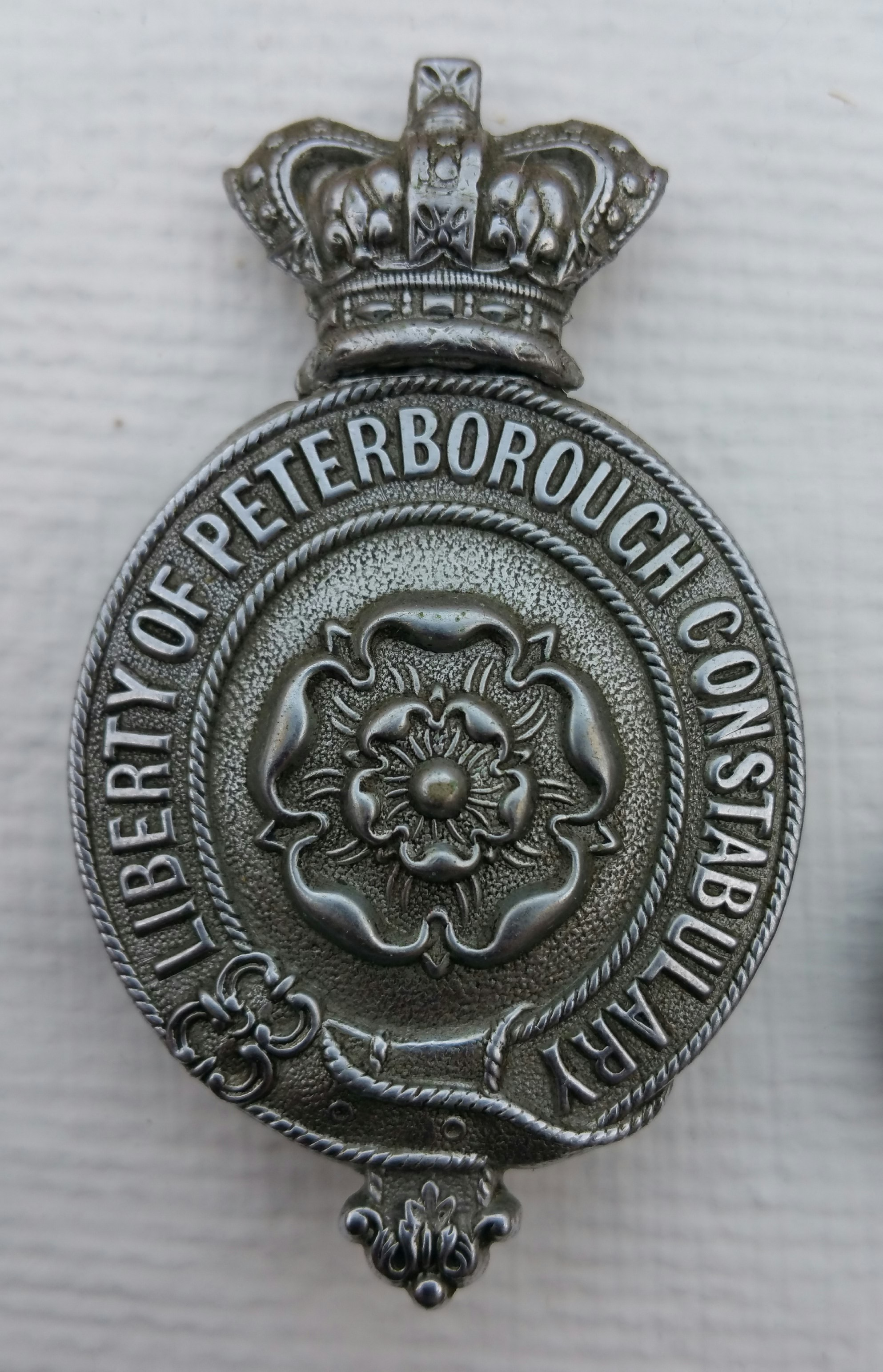
Liberty of Peterborough Constabulary chromed Day Badge

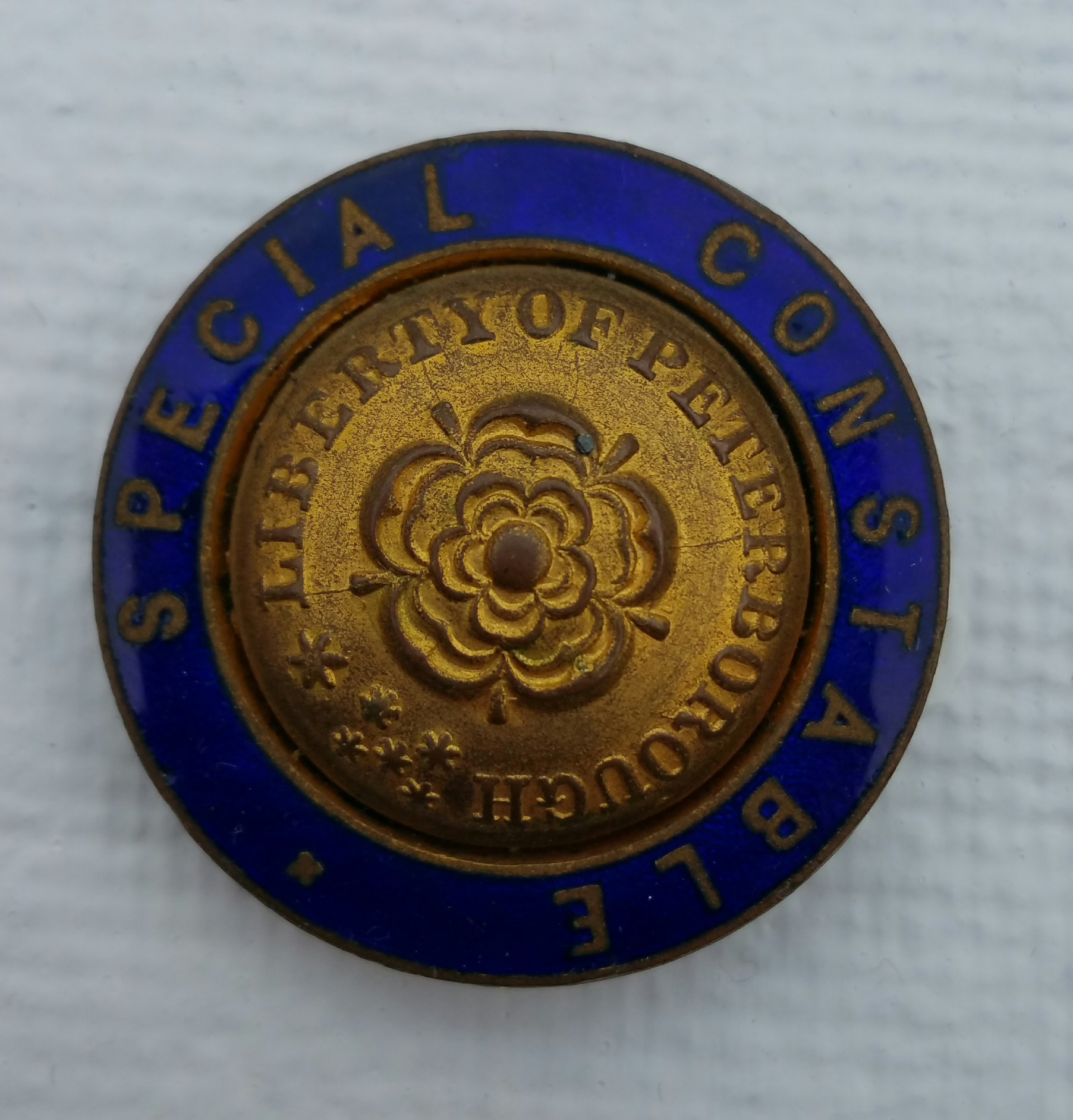
Liberty of Peterborough Constabulary Special Constables Badge

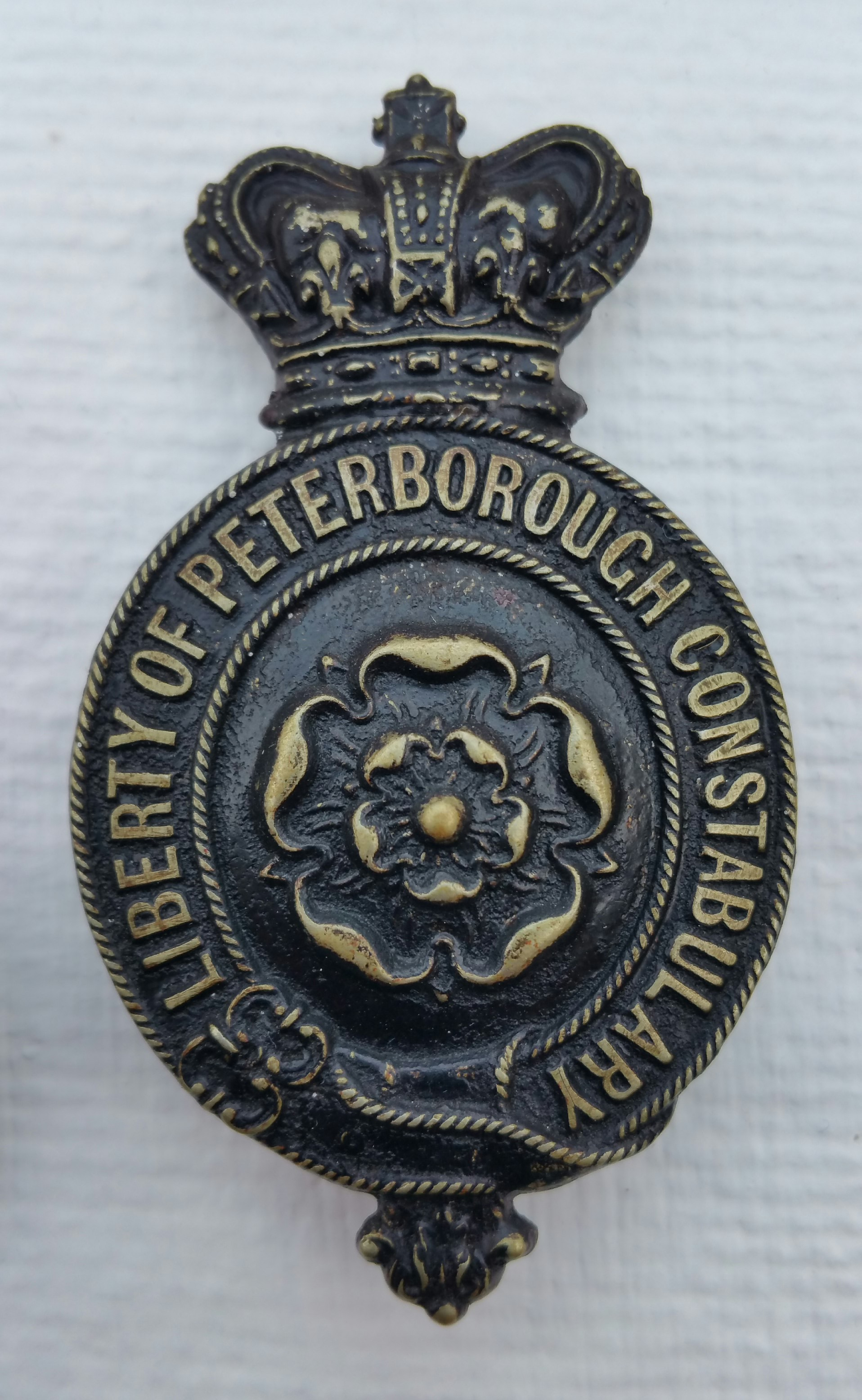
Liberty of Peterborough Constabulary Night Badge

== Chief Constables of the Liberty of Peterborough ==
- 1857 - 1876 Captain Henry Lambert Bayly, also Chief Constable of Northamptonshire.
- 1876 - 1881 Thomas Orde Hastings Lees, also Chief Constable of Northamptonshire.
- 1881 - 1931 James Kellie-MacCallum, also Chief Constable of Northamptonshire.
- 1931 - 1943 Thomas Danby, also Chief Constable of The Peterborough City Police.
- 1943 - 1947 Francis George Markin, also Chief Constable of The Peterborough City Police.

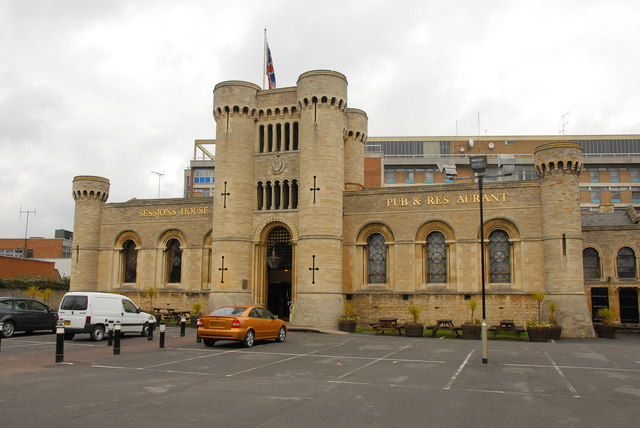
The Sessions House, Peterborough

== Constables of the Liberty of Peterborough ==
At the time of the amalgamation in 1947.

Police Constables: Jackson, Chapman, Palmby, Thursby, Willonsby, Bigg, Page, and Sergent Trundle.

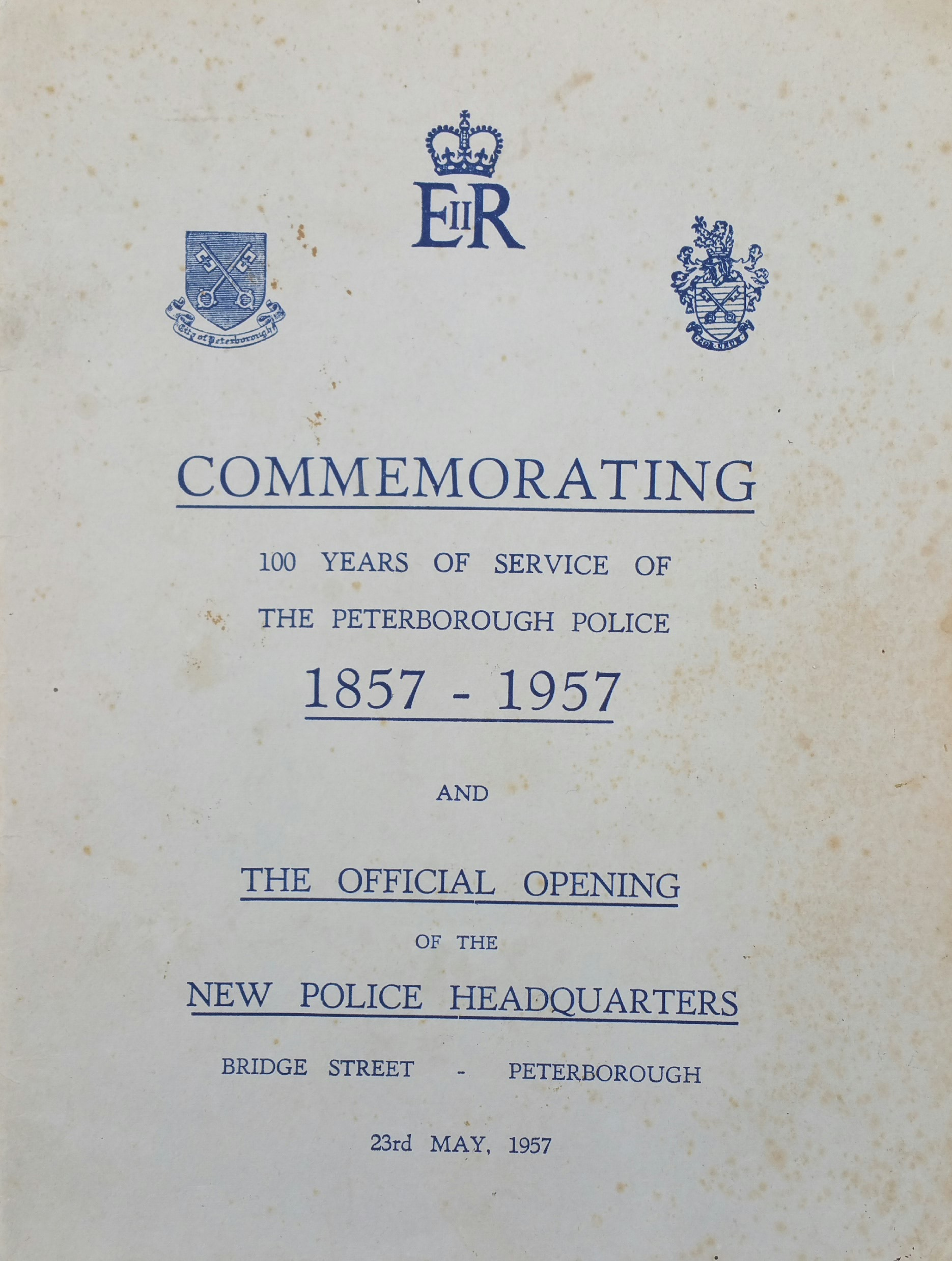
Booklet 100 years of Peterborough Police.

== Headquarters ==
The constabulary had its headquarters in the old gaol behind the Sessions House on Thorpe Road in Peterborough.

== See also ==
- Peterborough City Police
- Peterborough Combined Police
- Mid-Anglia Constabulary
- Cambridgeshire Constabulary
- Policing in the United Kingdom
- Soke of Peterborough
