= Cromer Hall =

Country house in Cromer, Norfolk, England

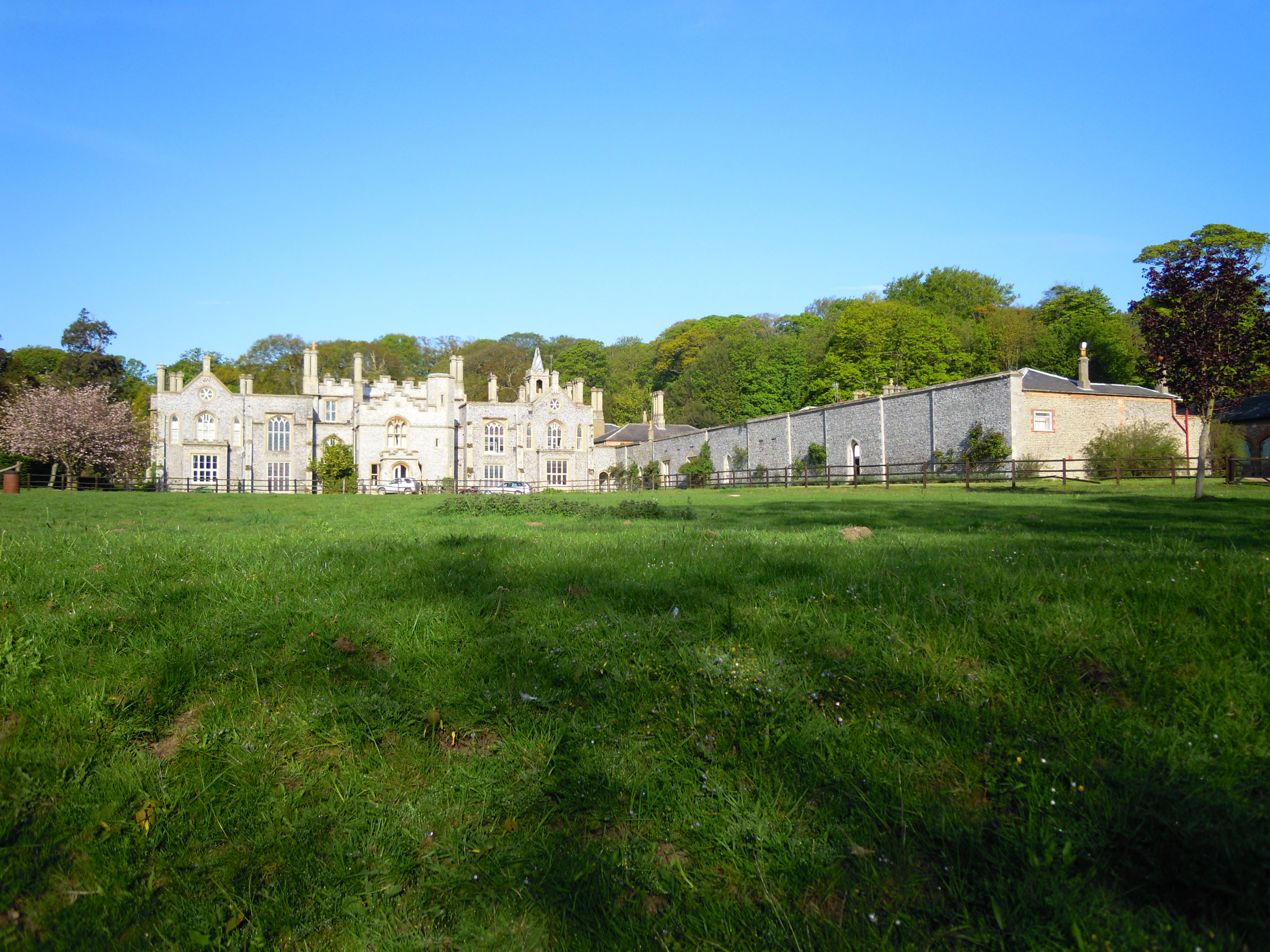
- View of the east elevation of Cromer Hall

- Location within Norfolk

General information
- Type: Country house
- Architectural style: Gothic Revival
- Location: Holt Road, near Cromer, Norfolk
- Coordinates: 52.9265°N 1.2934°E
- Completed: Built in 1829
- Owner: Private

Design and construction
- Architect: William Donthorne

Cromer Hall is a country house located one mile south of Cromer on Holt Road, in the English county of Norfolk. The present house was built in 1829 by architect William Donthorne. The hall is a Grade II* listed building.

== Description ==
Cromer Hall was built in a variant of the Gothic Revival style, dubbed "Tudor Gothic" by architectural historian Nikolaus Pevsner; it is constructed in flint, with stone dressings and a slate roof. Additions were made in 1875. The building has an asymmetrical plan and has sections of two and three storeys. The central three-storey section is crenellated at the parapets with moulded copings. The large windows are all of a Gothic design, with large mullions featuring four centred heads and tracery. At the front centre is a projecting two-storey section with stepped gable and octagonal tower on the north corner. Projecting from this is an entrance porch with embattled parapet and four-centred-arch doorway. To the north and south ends of the front elevation there are bay windowed gables, each with a round window near the peak of the gable and a corbelled chimney at the apex. The north gabled wing has a bell tower over the roof with battlements and a short spire. The building has many tall octagonal stone chimneys, some single and some in groups. Adjoining the main house to the north east there are a range of buildings which include stables and domestic wing. This section is built behind flint screen wall with three and four-centred headed doorways and two stone mullion and transom windows. The entire outside walls are of flint construction, but inside walls facing the courtyard are of brick construction with low-pitched, hipped, slated roofs. The wing also has octagonal chimneys. The rooms have sash windows with glazing bars and there are large four-centred, arch-headed carriageway doors.

== Literary connections ==
The hall has a strong literary connection thanks to a visit to the house by the writer Arthur Conan Doyle, most noted for his stories about the detective Sherlock Holmes. In 1901 Conan Doyle had returned from South Africa, suffering from typhoid fever. To aid his recuperation, the author decided to take a golfing holiday in North Norfolk, accompanied by the journalist and writer, Bertram Fletcher Robinson. The two friends stayed at the Royal Links Hotel in Cromer. During their stay, Doyle probably heard the Norfolk legend of 'Black Shuck', the Hell Hound of Norfolk. The following description of Baskerville Hall in Doyle's book can also be matched to the exterior aspects of Cromer Hall.

The avenue opened into a broad expanse of turf, and the house lay before us. In the fading light I could see that the centre was a heavy block of building from which a porch projected. The whole front was draped in ivy, with a patch clipped bare here and there where a window or a coat-of-arms broke through the dark veil. From this central block rose the twin towers, ancient, crenellated, and pierced with many loopholes. To right and left of the turrets were more modern wings of black granite. A dull light shone through heavy mullioned windows, and from the high chimneys which rose from the steep, high-angled roof there sprang a single black column of smoke…

From The Hound of the Baskervilles by Arthur Conan Doyle, originally serialised in the Strand Magazine from August 1901 to April 1902. Unfortunately, Doyle himself said nothing in his autobiography about the writing of The Hound of the Baskervilles. Although the setting for the story was Devon, Doyle's visit to Cromer undoubtedly provided part of the inspiration.

== Occupants ==
Cromer Hall was bought by Benjamin Bond Cabbell from Lady Listowel (daughter of Admiral William Lukin Windham) in 1852. He was succeeded at Cromer Hall by his nephew John Cabbell who changed his name to Bond-Cabbell in 1875. He was succeeded by his son, Benjamin Bond-Cabbell, in 1878.

== The hall today ==
Cromer Hall is not open to the public (summer 2010) and the house is still a private residence. The best position from which to view the building is Hall Road, which leads south from Cromer to the village of Felbrigg. It is described at length in a 2002 article by Roderick O'Donnell in Country Life magazine.

In the summer of 2017, the hall hosted two open-air concerts.
