= William Donthorn =

English architect

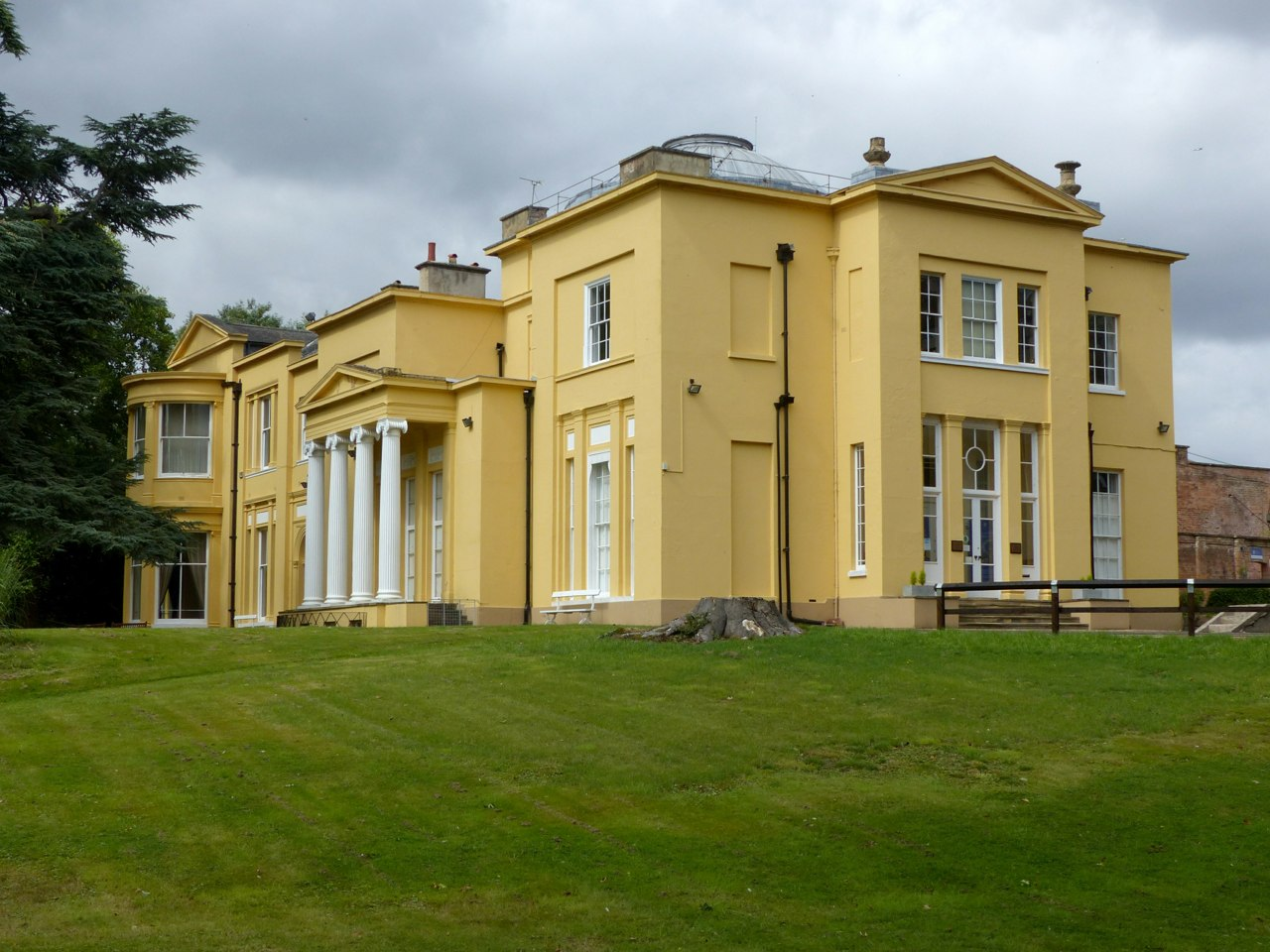
Upton Hall, Nottinghamshire

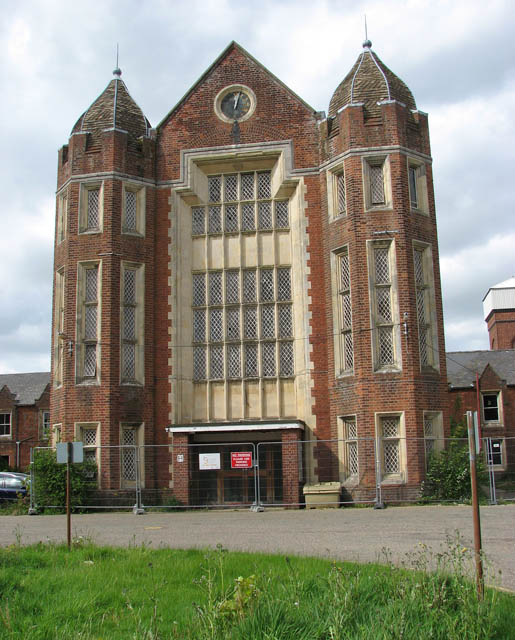
Aylsham workhouse, south elevation

William John Donthorn (Donthorne in some sources) (1799 – 18 May 1859) was an English architect, and one of the founders of what became the Royal Institute of British Architects (RIBA).

He was born in Swaffham, Norfolk. He was a pupil of Sir Jeffry Wyattville from 1817 to 1820, and as part of his training, exhibited at the Royal Academy Summer Exhibition in 1817. He worked both in the Gothic and Classical styles but is perhaps best known for his severe Greek Revival country houses, most of which have been demolished.

In 1834 he was one of several prominent architects to form the Institute of British Architects in London (later the RIBA). A large number of his drawings are in the RIBA drawings collection, now housed at the Victoria and Albert Museum.

His work is analysed by Roderick O'Donnell as architecture "with great hardness and decision in the edges".

== Works ==
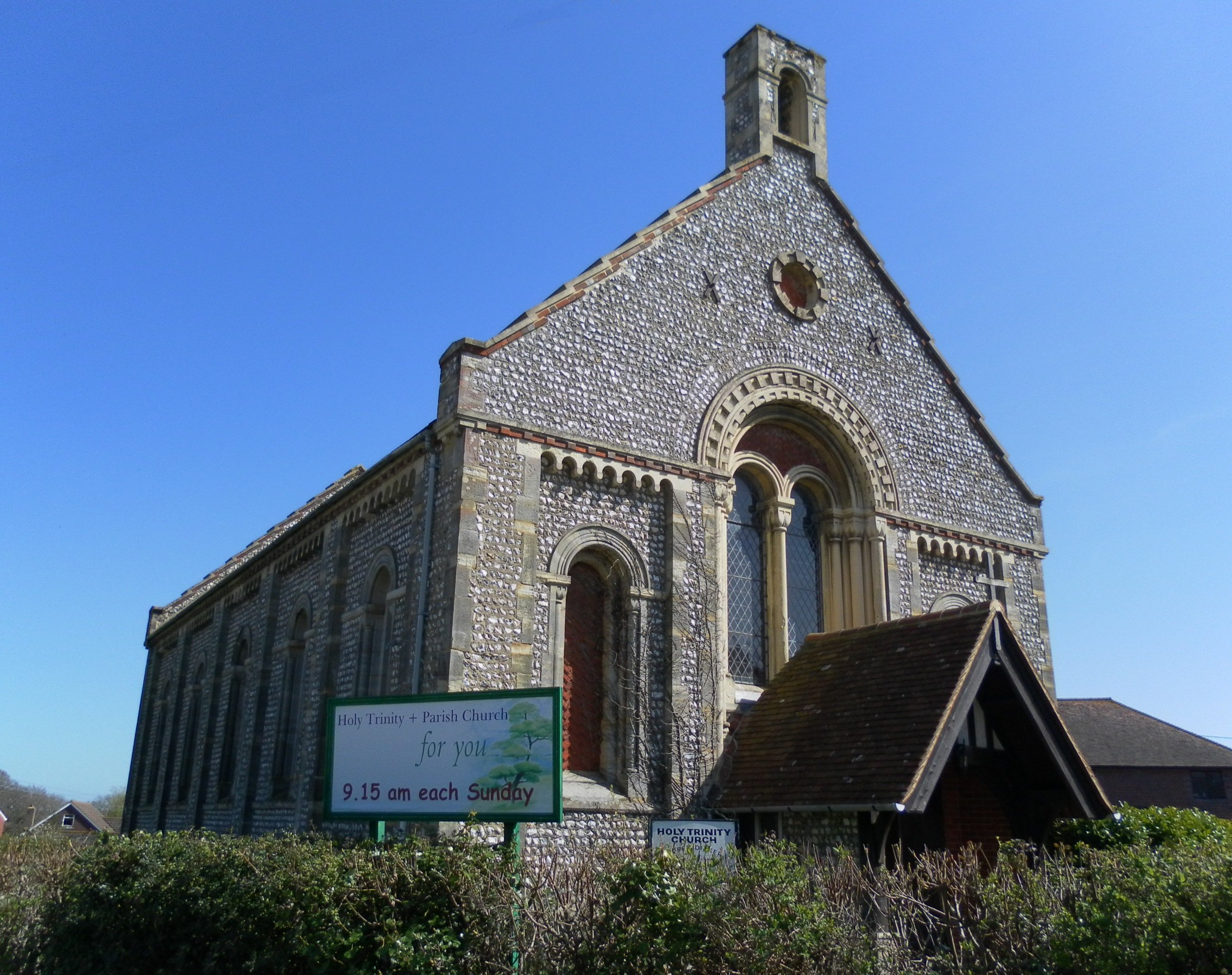
Donthorn designed Holy Trinity Church at Upper Dicker, East Sussex, completed in 1843

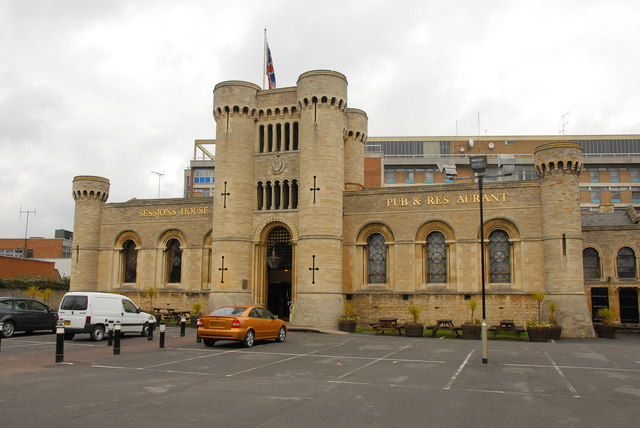
Sessions House (1842), Thorpe Road, Peterborough

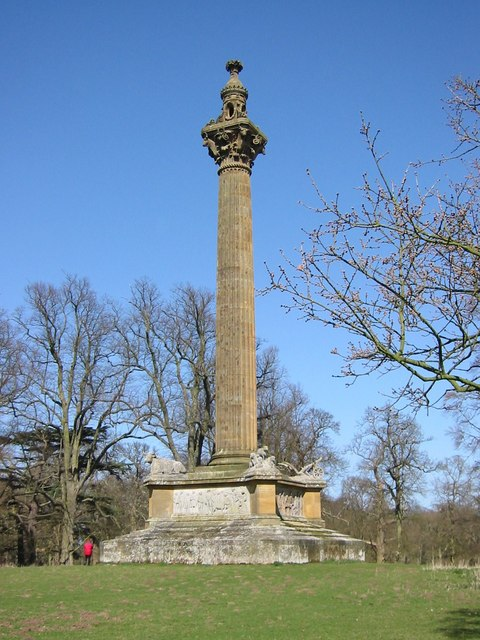
The Leicester Monument on the grounds of Holkham Hall

- Cromer Hall, Cromer, Norfolk, 1829
- Heronden Hall, Tenterden, Kent, 1846
- Elmham Hall, Norfolk (demolished)
- Hillington Hall, Norfolk (demolished c.1947 but the gatehouse remains)
- Watlington Hall, Norfolk (demolished)
- Pickenham Hall, South Pickenham, Norfolk (demolished). Between 1902 and 1905, architect Robert Weir Schultz extensively rebuilt and enlarged the hall, incorporating some Donthorn rooms, in the Arts and Crafts style.
- improvements to Felbrigg Hall, Norfolk
- Upton Hall, near Southwell, Nottinghamshire
- Highcliffe Castle near Christchurch, Dorset (from 1830)
- workhouses in Ely (1837) and Wisbech (1838) (Cambridgeshire, demolished), Aylsham (1848–9, later St Michael's Hospital), Downham Market (Norfolk, demolished), and Oakham and Uppingham (Rutland)
- Sessions House, Peterborough (completed 1842)
- Holy Trinity Church, Upper Dicker, East Sussex (1843)
- the Leicester Monument at Holkham Hall, erected in 1845–1848 in honour of Thomas Coke, 1st Earl of Leicester
- The Old Rectory, Dummer, near Basingstoke, Hampshire (1850)
- The Old Rectory, Hallaton, Leicestershire (1843)
- Home Farm, Marham, Norfolk (completed 1860): Gothic house with classical stables, all Grade II listed.
