= Peterborough Combined Police =

Police force in Peterborough, England

Agency overview
- Formed: 1 April 1947
- Preceding agencies: Peterborough City Police; Liberty of Peterborough Constabulary

Jurisdictional structure
- Operations jurisdiction: Peterborough, England, UK
- Legal jurisdiction: England & Wales
- Constituting instrument: County and Borough Police Act 1856
- General nature: Local civilian police

Operational structure
- Headquarters: Milton Street, Westwood Airfield Temporarily & Bridge Street Peterborough
- Agency executive: Francis George Markin, Chief Constable
- Area Commands: Peterborough

Peterborough Combined Police was the territorial police force responsible for law enforcement in Peterborough, England, from 1947 to 1965. It was created from the amalgamation of the Liberty of Peterborough Constabulary and the Peterborough City Police.

== History ==
=== 1856–1947 ===
Following the passing of the County and Borough Police Act 1856, the Liberty of Peterborough Constabulary was formed the following year on 10 March 1857. Later, in 1874, a Charter of Incorporation was granted to the city of Peterborough, prompting the council to form a Watch Committee along with the Peterborough City Police.

These two forces were combined on 1 April 1947 to form the Peterborough Combined Police.

=== 1947–1965 ===
In the hot summer of 1958 the Peterborough combined police became the first police force in the UK to issue white summer tunics along with white helmets for that year. It was not a success however as the public ridiculed the policemen as Ice Cream men which ended the jackets and helmets after only a very few days.

On 31 March 1965, five police forces in the Cambridge area—Peterborough Combined Police, Cambridge City Police, Cambridgeshire Constabulary, Huntingdonshire Constabulary and Isle of Ely Constabulary—were united to form the Mid-Anglia Constabulary, headquartered in Brampton. The name changed on 31 March 1974 to form today's Cambridgeshire Constabulary following alterations to the county boundaries.

Badges and Summer Uniform of the Peterborough Combined Police.
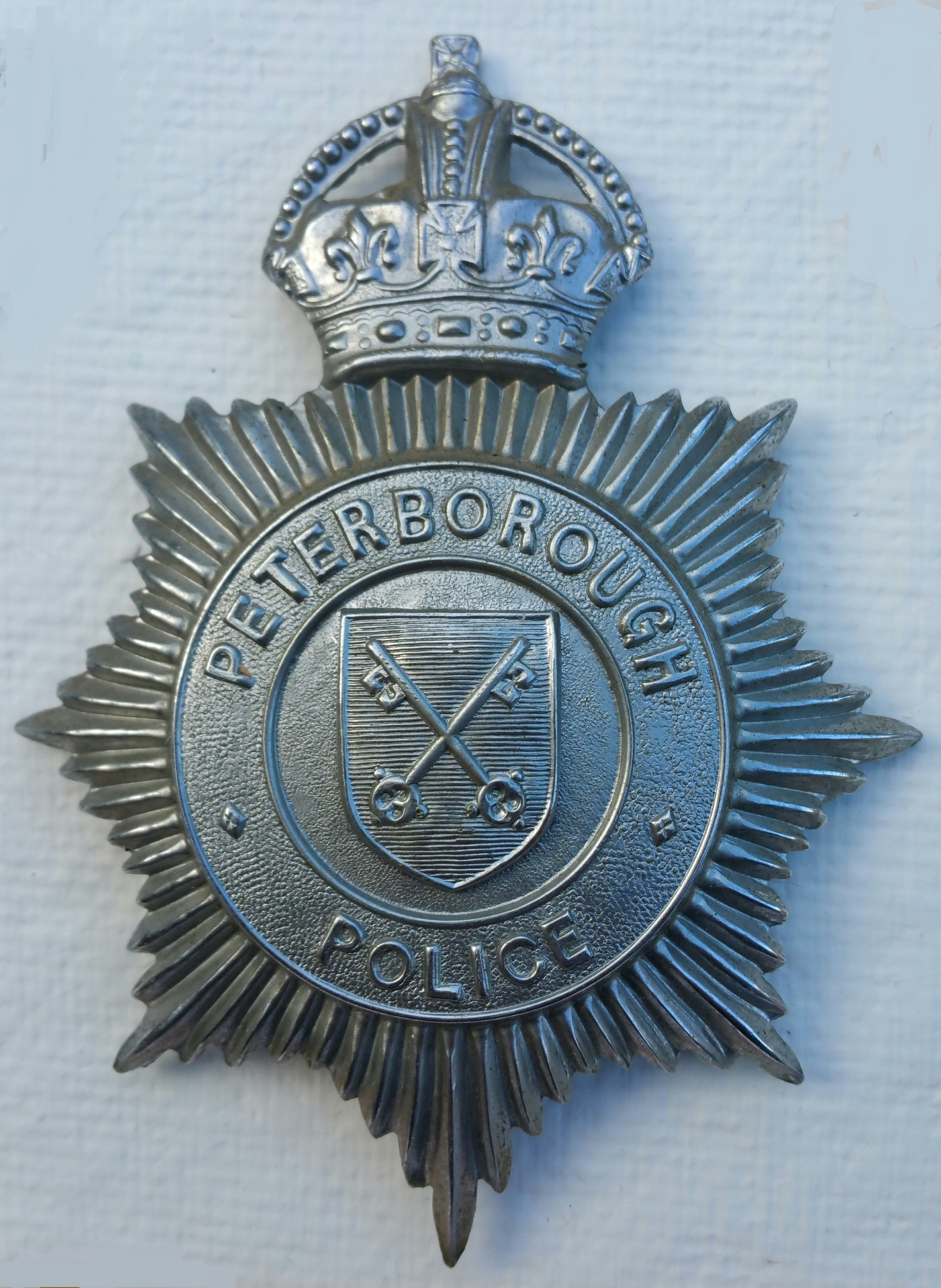
Kings Crown Peterborough Combined Police Badge 1947-1952

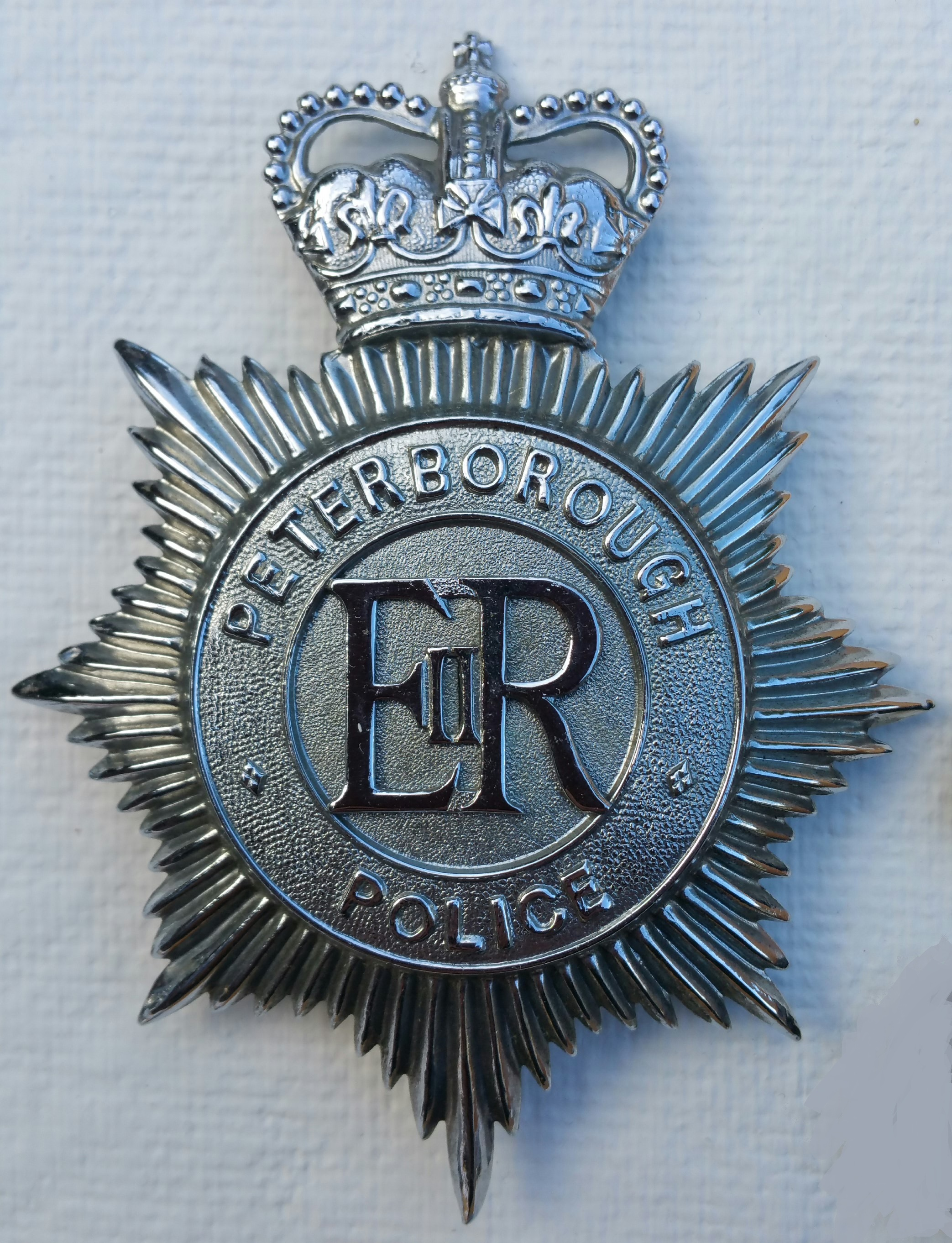
Queens Crown Peterborough Combined Police Badge 1952-1965

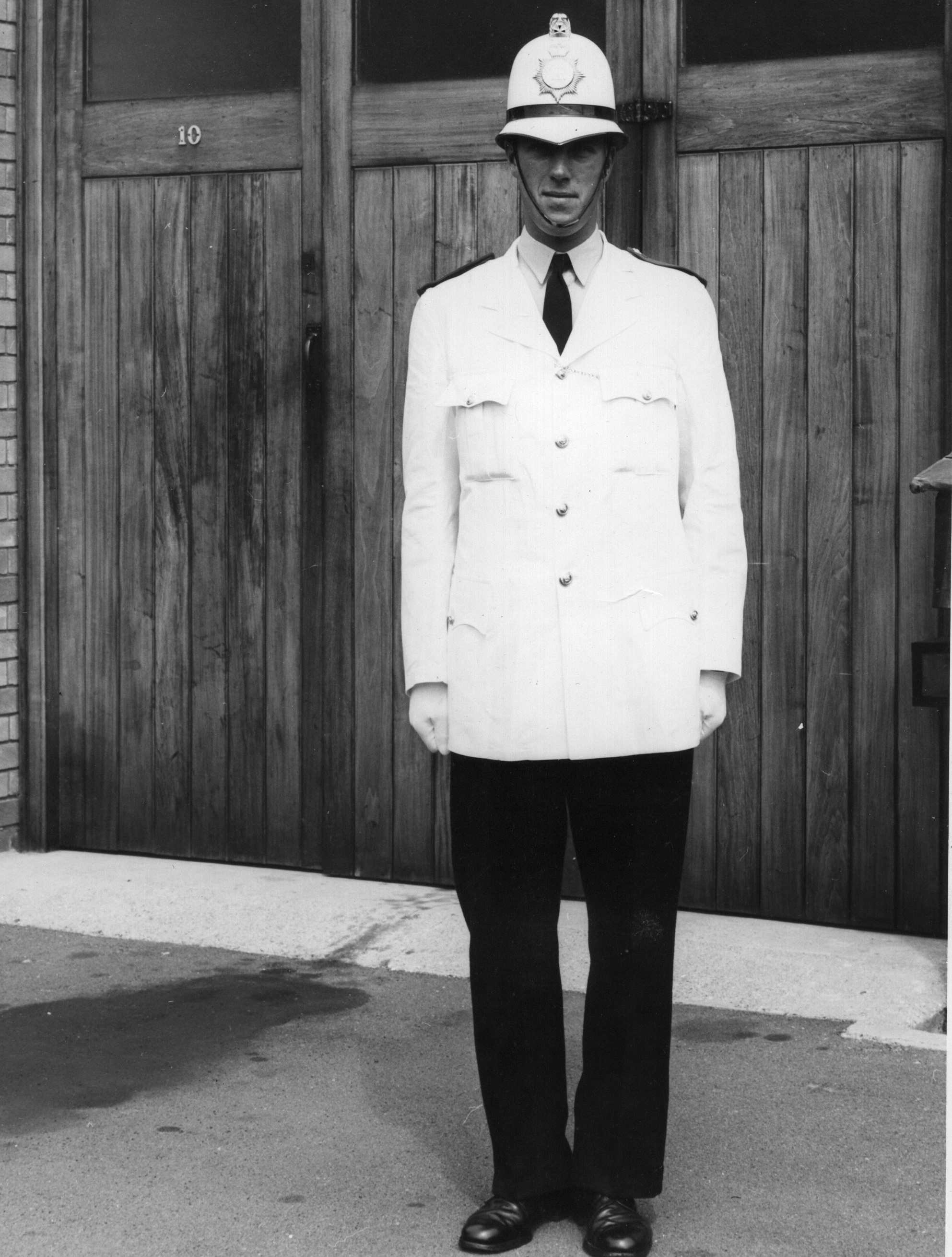
Peterborough Combined Police White Summer Uniform 1958

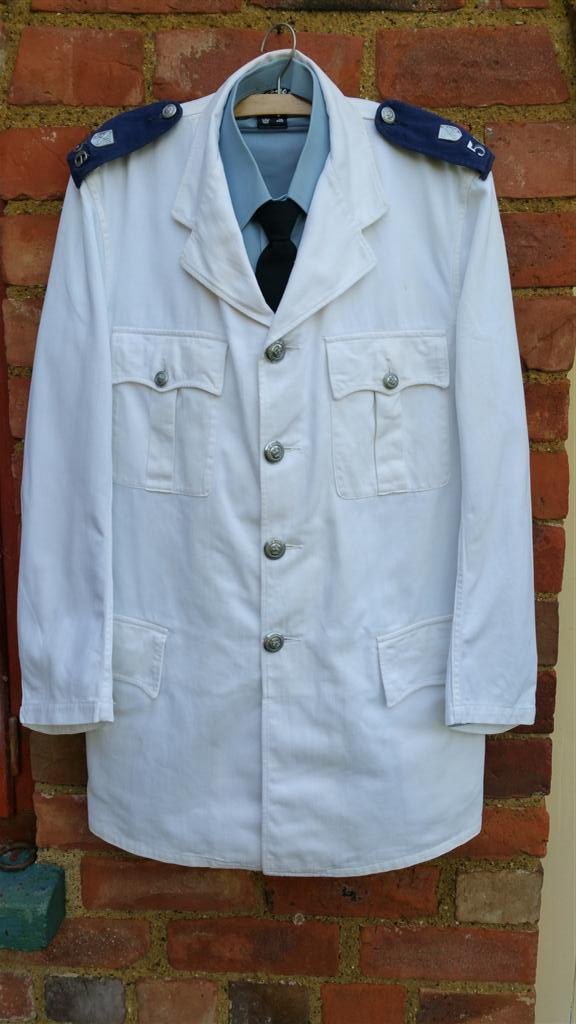
Peterborough Combined Police Summer Jacket 1958

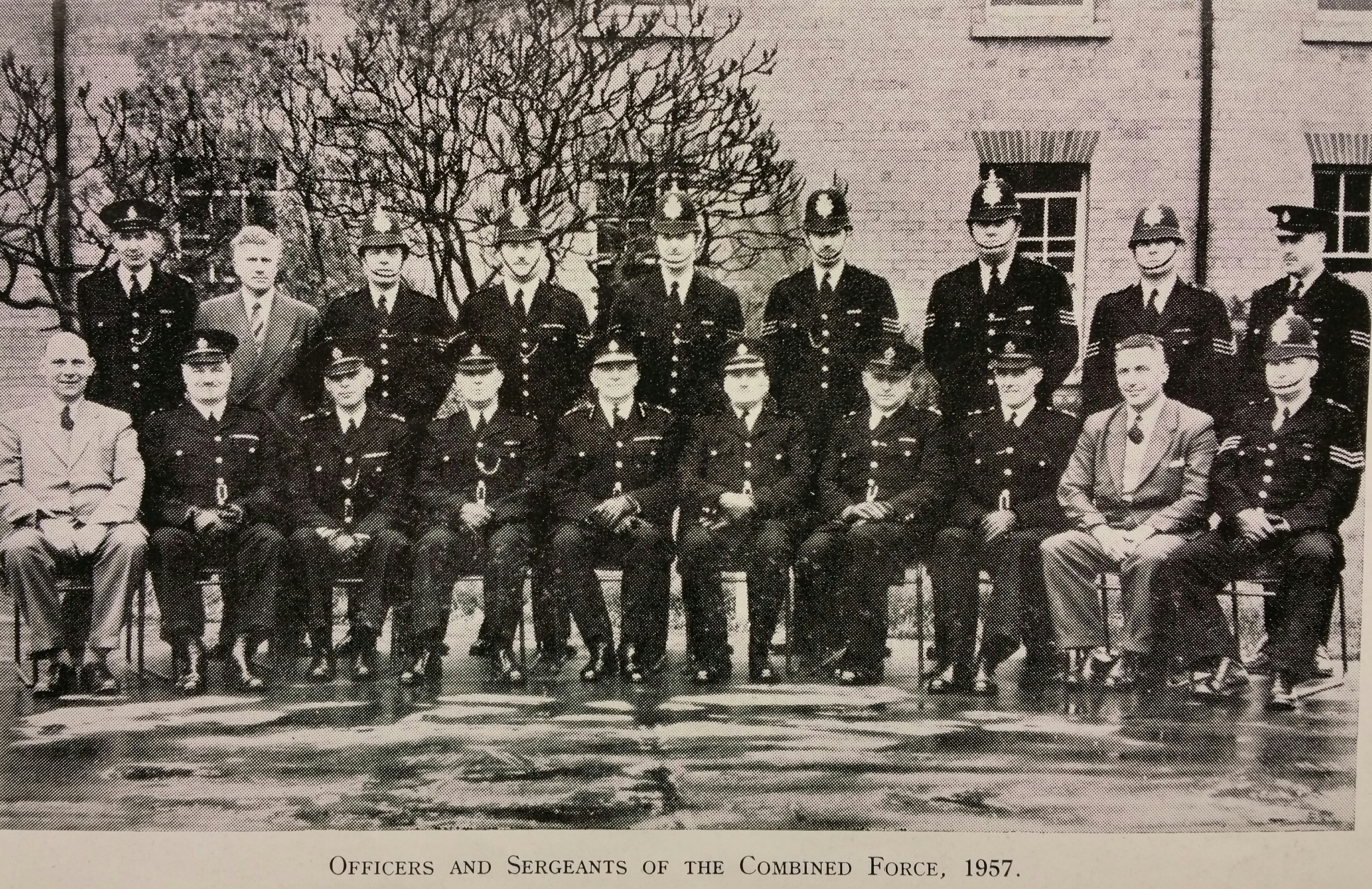

Top Row: Insp Charlie Balaam, Detective Sgt John Soams, Sgt Stan Lancaster, Sgt Ron Forth, Sgt John Walker, Sgt John Norman, Sgt Jim Arnold, Sgt 'Chips' Chapman, Sgt Gilbert Dobson.

Bottom Row: Detective Insp Percy Vincent, Insp Roy Wool, Insp Harold Southgate, Insp Eric Hubble, Chief Constable Francis George Markin, Chief Insp Reg Beals, Insp Jack Mills, Insp Steve Maddocks, Detective Sgt Major Briggs, Sgt Peter Unsworth.

== See also ==
- Peterborough City Police
- Liberty of Peterborough Constabulary
- Cambridgeshire Constabulary
- Law enforcement in the United Kingdom
- Cambridgeshire Fire and Rescue Service
- East of England Ambulance Service
