= Peterborough Combined Court Centre =

Judicial building in Peterborough, England

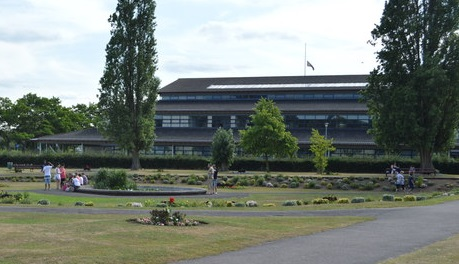
- Peterborough Combined Court Centre seen from the Lido Gardens

- Shown in Cambridgeshire
- 52.5699°N 0.2399°W
- Location: Rivergate, Peterborough

History
- Built: 1987

Site notes
- Architect: Cambridge Design
- Architectural style: Modernist style

The Peterborough Combined Court Centre is a Crown Court venue, which deals with criminal cases, as well as a County Court venue, which deals with civil cases, in Rivergate, Peterborough, England.

== History ==
Until the late 1980s, the main venue for criminal court hearings in Peterborough was the magistrates' court in the Sessions House in Thorpe Road. (Note: The county assizes for the county of Huntingdon and Peterborough were held in Huntingdon Town Hall until the county was abolished in 1974.) However, as the number of court cases in the Peterborough area grew, it became necessary to create modern courtrooms for the crown court and the county court. The site selected by the Lord Chancellor's Department had originally been divided by a river known as Bell's Dyke and was occupied by a foundry owned by a local bellmaker, Henry Penn. A modern magistrates' court building was completed on the west side of the site in 1978, leaving space on the east side for the proposed combined court centre.

The new combined court centre was designed by Cambridge Design in the Modernist style, built in glass and steel at a cost of £4 million, and was completed in 1987. The design involved a symmetrical main frontage with seven bays facing south towards The Embankment. The ground floor, which was projected forward, featured a row of eight columns which divided the bays and supported a modillioned pavilion roof. The central section of three bays was fenestrated with casement windows while the outer bays were recessed under the pavilion roof. The first floor, which was narrower, was designed in a similar style with a central section which was fenestrated, and some outer bays which were recessed under another pavilion roof. The second floor, which was narrower again, was fenestrated and surmounted by a pediment containing a Royal coat of arms. Internally, the building was laid out to accommodate six courtrooms.

In October 2001, three prisoners escaped from the building after they had attacked Group 4 security officers and then placed them in a holding cell.

Notable cases have included the trial and conviction of Jamie Juste, in July 2009, on a charge of grievous bodily harm committed against his female partner after they had both taken part in a discussion about alleged infidelity on the Jeremy Kyle Show. His partner had sustained a "shattered eye socket and cheekbone and bite marks".
