= Sessions House, Peterborough =

County building in Peterborough, Cambridgeshire, England

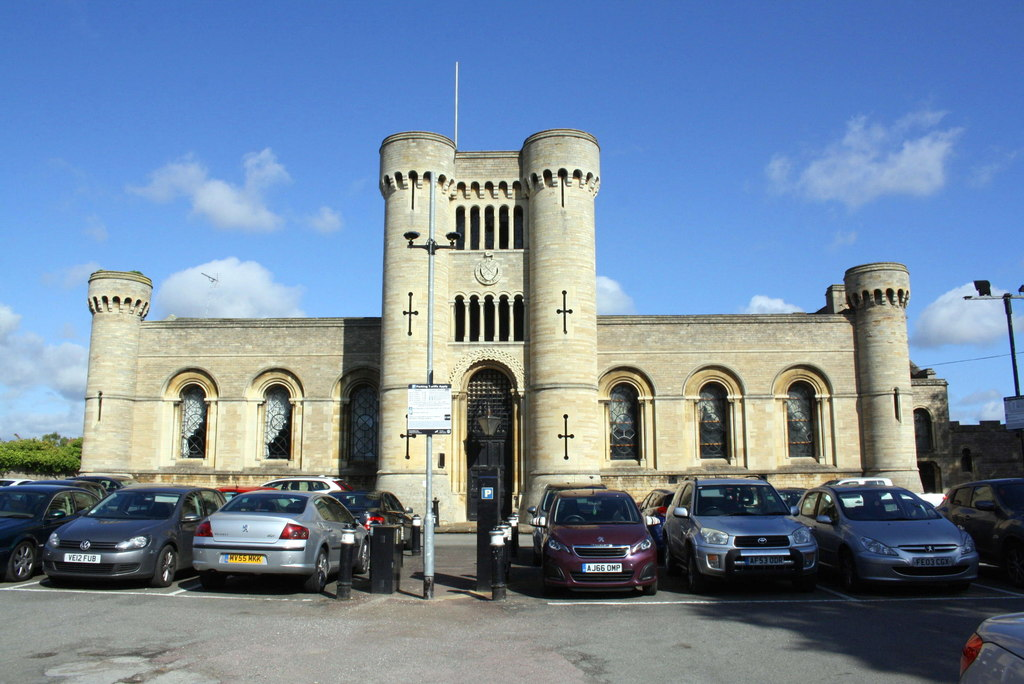
- Sessions House, Peterborough

- Shown in Cambridgeshire
- 52.5730°N 0.2547°W
- Location: Thorpe Road, Peterborough

History
- Built: 1842

Site notes
- Architect: William Donthorne
- Architectural style: Norman style

Listed Building – Grade II
- Official name: Old Gaol
- Designated: 7 May 1973
- Reference no.: 1126946

The Sessions House is a former judicial building in Thorpe Road, Peterborough, Cambridgeshire, England. The building, which was the main courthouse for the Soke of Peterborough and is currently unused, is a Grade II listed building.

== History ==
The original custodial facility for the Soke of Peterborough was the Abbot's Prison in Long Causeway, which had fallen into decay. The lord paramount, the Marquess of Exeter, was indicted in 1795 for allowing this to happen. It was rebuilt in the late 18th century but was deemed too small and closed in the early 1840s.

The proposed layout for the new site on Thorpe Road involved an octagonal outer wall, a rectangular prison building at the centre of the site and an entrance block at the front breaking the outer wall at that point. The complex was designed by William Donthorne in the Norman style, built in stone at a cost of £8,000 and was completed in 1842. The design of the entrance block involved a symmetrical main frontage of seven bays facing onto Thorpe Road. The central bay was formed by three-storey tower with a tall round-headed doorway with a portcullis on the ground floor, and five-part mullioned windows on the first and second floors. The tower was flanked by full height turrets with lancet windows and machicolations. The wings of three bays each, which were single storey, were fenestrated by round-headed windows with colonettes, architraves and hood moulds. There were also turrets with lancet windows and machicolations at the outer corners of the building.

The entrance block incorporated a courtroom for the use of the magistrates and became known as the Sessions House. The magistrates of the Soke of Peterborough, when siting as the court of quarter sessions, had powers to try more serious cases: such powers were normally only exercised by the judges sitting in the courts of assize rather than by a mere magistrates' court. The Liberty of Peterborough Constabulary, which was formed in 1857, also established its headquarters in the complex. After the prisoners were transferred to Cambridge or Northampton, the prison closed in 1878.

The police service took over the old prison building, but it became surplus to requirements and was demolished after the police service moved to a new police station in Bridge Street in May 1957. The sessions house at the front of the site continued to operate as a courthouse. However, as the number of court cases in the Peterborough area grew, it became necessary to create modern courtrooms. A modern magistrates' court building was completed on the west side of Rivergate in 1978, leaving space on the east side for the Peterborough Combined Court Centre, which opened in 1987.

Meanwhile, the old sessions house was converted into a Mitchells & Butlers public house in the 1980s, and then, in 2002, it became a bar and restaurant. After the bar and restaurant closed, the site was marketed for sale in 2013, and, since then, the sessions house has remained unused.
