= Cambridge City Police =

Defunct police force

Cambridge City Police was the territorial police force responsible for law enforcement in Cambridge, England, from 1836 to 1965. From its creation until April 1951 it was known as Cambridge Borough Police. It subsequently merged with four other police forces to become what is known today as Cambridgeshire Constabulary.

== History ==
The Cambridge Borough Police was established on 21 January 1836 to police within the boundary of the borough, an area much smaller then than it is today. At this time, the force employed just thirty police officers.

Outside the town and borough there were no other police forces in Cambridgeshire until April 1851 when the Cambridgeshire County Constabulary was established, initially employing a total of seventy officers.

In 1951 the Borough of Cambridge was granted city status by HM King George VI. The force title was changed accordingly.

On 31 March 1965, five police forces — Cambridge City Police, Isle of Ely Constabulary, Huntingdonshire Constabulary, Peterborough Combined Police and Cambridgeshire County Constabulary — were united to form the Mid-Anglia Constabulary, headquartered in Brampton. Following alterations to local government boundaries the force name was changed on 31 March 1974 to Cambridgeshire Constabulary.

=== Force strength ===
The strength of the force was recorded in the annual reports of the inspectors appointed under the County and Borough Police Act 1856 from 1856 until its abolition in 1965 as follows:

- Before 1856: 23
- 1856–1866: 34
- 1866–1869: 40
- 1869–1870: 41
- 1870–1871: 44
- 1871–1874: 45
- 1874–1880: 48
- 1880–1890: 51
- 1890–1894: 53
- 1894–1900: 55
- 1900–1902: 63
- 1902–1912: 65
- 1912–1934: 87 (this large increase was due to the enlargement of the borough's boundaries)
- 1934–1935: 90
- 1935–1937: 92
- 1937–1939: 110
- 1939–1948: 120
- 1948–1949: 128 – of whom six were female
- 1949–1950: 129 – of whom six were female
- 1950–1951: 120 – of whom six were female
- 1951–1952: 160 – of whom six were female
- 1952–1961: 161 – of whom six were female
- 1961–1963: 162 – of whom six were female
- 1963–1965: 201 – of whom eight were female

=== Chief constables ===
- 1836–1842 John Titterton (Superintendent)
- 1842–1846 Captain Charles Courant Bailey
- 1858–1889: William Garnham Turrall
- 1889–1894: Charles Edward Septimus Innes
- 1894–1918: Charles Edward Holland
- 1919–1944: Robert John Pearson
- 1944–1963: Bernard Nicholas Bebbington - appointed Her Majesty's Inspector of Constabulary 1963.
- 1963–1965: Frederick Drayton Porter - also appointed chief constable of Cambridgeshire County Constabulary Became Chief Constable of Mid Anglia Constabulary

== See also ==
- Policing in the United Kingdom
- Cambridgeshire Fire and Rescue Service
- East of England Ambulance Service
