= Cambridgeshire Constabulary =

English territorial police force

- Motto: Creating a safer Cambridgeshire

Agency overview
- Formed: 1836, 1965 (merger)
- Preceding agencies: Cambridge City Police; Cambridgeshire Constabulary (1951–1965); Peterborough Combined Police; Isle of Ely Constabulary; Huntingdonshire Constabulary
- Volunteers: 84
- Annual budget: £217.4 million (2026/27)

Jurisdictional structure
- Operations jurisdiction: Cambridgeshire & Peterborough, England, United Kingdom
- Map of police area
- Area: 1,311 square miles (3,400 km^{2})
- Population: 0.93 million
- Legal jurisdiction: England and Wales
- Constituting instrument: Police Act 1964
- General nature: Local civilian police

Operational structure
- Overseen by: His Majesty's Inspectorate of Constabulary and Fire & Rescue Services; Independent Office for Police Conduct
- Headquarters: Hinchingbrooke, Huntingdon
- Police officers: 1,383
- PCSOs: 115
- Police and Crime Commissioner responsible: Darryl Preston (from 13 May 2021)
- Agency executive: Simon Megicks, Chief Constable
- Area Commands: North (Peterborough, Fenland); South (Huntingdonshire, Cambridge, South Cambridgeshire, East Cambridgeshire)

Facilities
- Stations: 11: Police Headquarters, Huntingdon; Cambourne; Parkside, Cambridge; Milton, Cambridgeshire; Ely; Huntingdon; March; Thorpe Wood, Peterborough; Sawston; St Ives; St Neots; Wisbech

Website
- www.cambs.police.uk

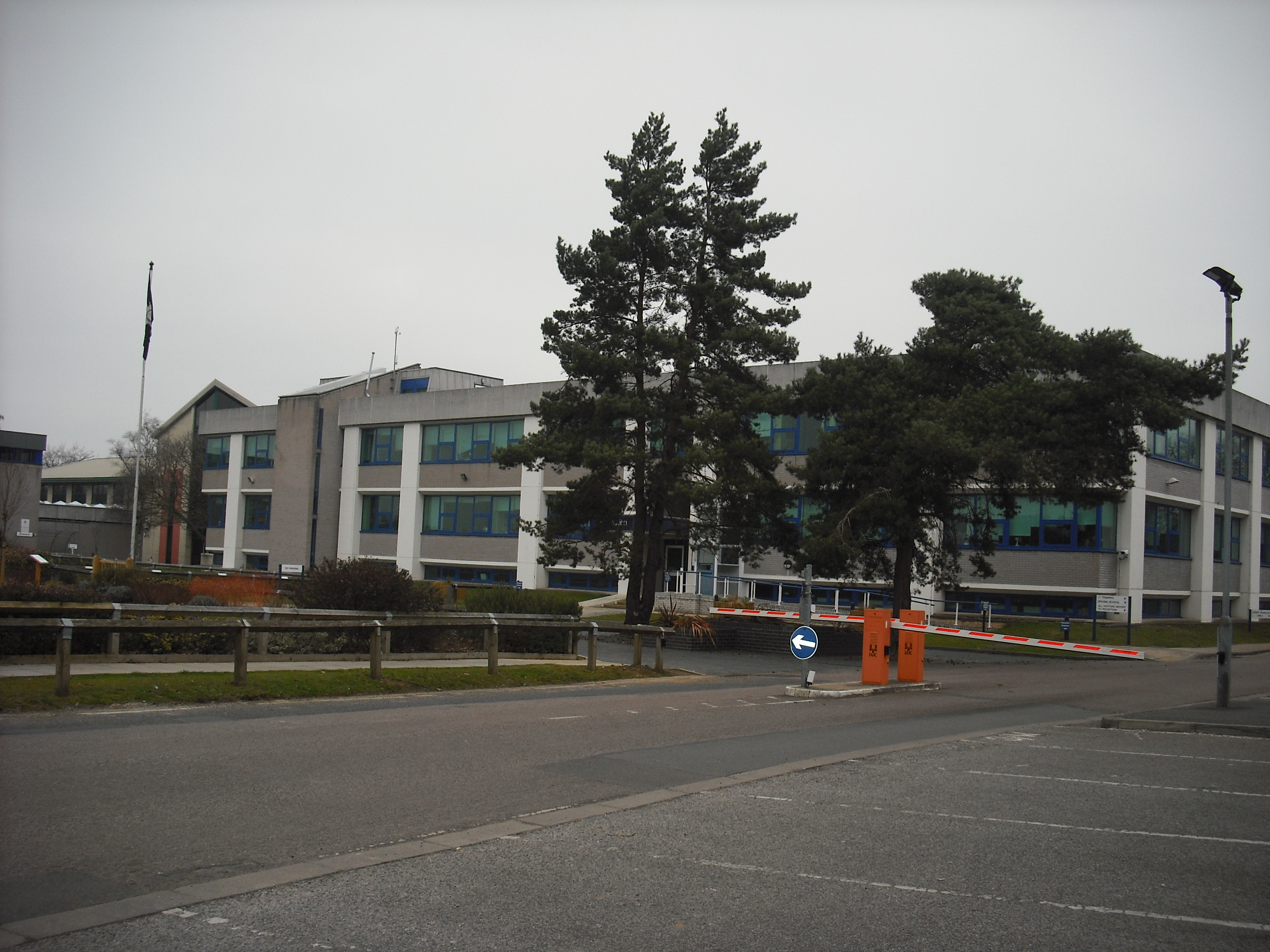
Cambridgeshire Constabulary's HQ in Huntingdon

Milton Police Station

Cambridgeshire Constabulary is the local territorial police force that covers the county of Cambridgeshire. It provides law enforcement and security for an area of 1,311 square miles (3,400 km^{2}) and population of 930,000 people, in a predominantly rural county. The force of Cambridgeshire includes the cities of Cambridge, Ely and Peterborough and the various market towns and villages. Its emblem is a crowned Brunswick star containing the heraldic badge of Cambridgeshire County Council.

According to a government report in March 2026 on policing numbers, the force consists of 1,708 police officers (giving the county a ratio of 163 officers per 100,000 people), 27 police community support officers and 822 members of staff. Together with 71 special constables and 76 police support volunteers. It had a budget in for the year of 2026 of £217.4 million, of which £118.7 million came directly as an annual grant from the Home Office and the rest from local council taxes.

The current Chief Constable is Simon Megicks. The force is overseen by the Cambridgeshire Police and Crime Commissioner (PCC).

== History & background ==
=== Beginnings ===
The origins of Cambridgeshire Constabulary date back to 1836, when the first police force within what are now the current boundaries of the force area was set up in the city of Cambridge under the name Cambridge Borough Police. This was followed in 1841 by establishment of the Isle of Ely Constabulary, covering the city of Ely, as well as Chatteris and March.

Cambridgeshire County Constabulary was formed in 1851 to police those rural parts of the county outside the jurisdiction of the Cambridge Borough Police. Huntingdonshire, the city and soke of Peterborough and the borough of Wisbech did not start their own forces until the passage of the County and Borough Police Act 1856. Wisbech Borough Police came under the authority of the Isle of Ely Constabulary in 1889. In 1949, the two forces that covered the city of Peterborough; the Liberty of Peterborough Constabulary and the Peterborough City Police merged to form Peterborough Combined Police. Cambridge Borough Police was renamed Cambridge City Police in 1951.

=== Mid-Anglia Constabulary to Cambridgeshire Constabulary ===
In 1965, all five forces that exist in the Cambridgeshire area (Cambridge City Police, Cambridgeshire Constabulary, Isle of Ely Constabulary, Huntingdonshire Constabulary, and Peterborough Combined Police) amalgamated to form the new Mid-Anglia Constabulary. The force was renamed Cambridgeshire Constabulary in 1974, when the new non-metropolitan county of Cambridgeshire was created by the Local Government Act 1972 with identical boundaries to the Mid-Anglia Constabulary area.

In 2001 the constabulary conducted one of Peterborough's biggest police enquiries following the racist murder of teenager Ross Parker.

2002 saw the Soham murders, an event that led to the biggest investigation in the history of Cambridgeshire police and one of the most expensive in the country, costing £3.5 million.

=== Past and current collaboration ===
In March 2006, as part of a review on policing nationally, the then Home Secretary Charles Clarke proposed the creation of an East Anglian force merging Cambridgeshire with Norfolk and Suffolk. While Norfolk and Cambridgeshire supported it, Suffolk would have preferred to be part of an "Eastern Coastal" force, with Norfolk and Essex. Essex, on the other hand, wanted to stay alone. However, these proposes were scrapped after a cabinet reshuffle, making John Reid the new Home Secretary.

Since 2010, the force has been collaborating with Bedfordshire Police and Hertfordshire Constabulary to form a mid-Anglia "triforce", with various departments collaborating to make local efficiencies with resources. Areas that have collaborated include Human Resources, Information Technology, Major Crime Unit, Dog Unit, Tactical Firearms Unit, Information Management Unit, Tickets and Collisions Office, Road Policing Unit, Scenes of Crime and Procurement.

There is also collaboration on a seven-force function with the adjacent forces of Norfolk, Suffolk, Essex and Kent with serious incident, counter terrorism and intelligence under the regional organised crime unit, the Eastern Region Special Operations Unit (ERSOU). Vehicle procurement is done in association with Thames Valley Police, British Transport Police and Civil Nuclear Constabulary as well as Hertfordshire and Bedfordshire under the Chiltern Transport Consortium.

=== Chief constables ===
Cambridgeshire Constabulary (1851)

- 1851–1876: Captain George Davies
- 1877–1888: Captain Reginald Calvert
- 1888–1915: Charles J D Stretten
- 1915–1919: Lt-Col Alan G Chichester
- 1919–1935: William V Webb
- 1935–1941: W Winter
- 1941–1945: W H Edwards
- 1948–1963: Donald C J Arnold; Arnold had been acting chief constable since 1946
- 1963–1965: Fredrick Drayton Porter

Mid-Anglia Constabulary (1965)

- 1965–1974: Frederick Drayton Porter

Cambridgeshire Constabulary (1974)

- 1974–1977: Frederick Drayton Porter
- 1977–1981: Victor Gilbert
- 1981–1993: Ian Kane
- 1994–2002: Dennis George "Ben" Gunn
- 2002–2005: Thomas Lloyd
- 2005–2010: Julie Spence
- 2010–2015: Simon Parr
- 2015–2018: Alec Wood
- 2018–2025: Nick Dean
- 2025–present: Simon Megicks

=== Officers killed in the line of duty ===
The Police Roll of Honour Trust and Police Memorial Trust list and commemorate all British police officers killed in the line of duty. Since its establishment in 1984, the Police Memorial Trust has erected 50 memorials nationally to some of those officers.

The following officers of Cambridgeshire Constabulary were killed while they were on duty, or returning to / from duty:

Name	Rank	Age	Date of death	Circumstances
Thomas Saunders Lamb	Constable	28	23 December 1841	Found drowned in the River Ouse on 16 February 1842, after going missing from his beat in the early hours of 23 December 1841, when it was suspected he was assaulted by several persons and thrown off a bridge into the river.
Richard Peak	Constable	24	18 August 1855	Went missing from his beat at Wicken in the early hours in suspicious circumstances, he had earlier been involved in a disturbance and it was suspected he was murdered by a local gang but his body was never found.
Francis James Willis	Detective sergeant	35	4 June 1930	While questioning a student at King's College, Cambridge, about his possession of a firearm, the suspect produced a pistol and shot his tutor, the officer attempted to arrest him but was shot twice and died the next day.
Reginald Nicholson	Special commandant	68	15 November 1945	Died as a result of injuries sustained when the police car in which he was travelling to a special constabulary conference was in a head-on collision with an armoured car at Melbourn.
William H. Edwards	Chief constable	44	25 November 1945	Died as a result of injuries received on 15 November when the police car in which he was travelling to a special constabulary conference was in a head-on collision with an armoured car at Melbourn.
Raymond George Bowland	Sergeant	34	9 April 1957	Died from an infectious disease contracted while performing search duty.
Anthony Allder	Constable	39	19 January 1966	Died from severe head injuries received on the night of 17 January when he was in collision with a car while on bicycle patrol on his beat at Gamlingay.
Dennis John Spackman	Constable	34	21 February 1967	While on motorcycle patrol at Meldreth, he lost control of his machine, which left the road and crashed through a fence and he was thrown into a concrete post and fatally injured.
Kenneth Hunt	Detective chief inspector	48	23 October 1981	Killed while returning to police headquarters after an investigation, when he lost control of his unmarked police car while overtaking a lorry and a car and his vehicle ran off the road into a Fenland waterway near Ramsey.
Edward Charles Reynolds	Constable	47	28 November 1984	Whilst engaged on an extended tour of duty with a Police Support Unit, during the national miners' strike, at Tilmastone Colliery in Kent, he was on standby in a police van when he collapsed and died of heart failure.
Alan John Lee	Constable	37	10 September 2002	Killed in a road traffic accident whilst reporting for duty at Thorpe Wood, when his motor scooter was in collision with a bus outside the police station.
Andreas Giovanni Newbury	Constable	34	5 February 2003	The officer was at the rear of his marked police car on the hard shoulder of the A1 motorway near Alconbury, preparing to protect the scene of a vehicle collision, when a passing car spun out of control in the icy road conditions and struck the officer, causing multiple injuries from which he died at the scene.
Karen Paterson	Constable	44	6 January 2012	Died when her car was in collision with another vehicle in the early morning at Langtoft, Lincolnshire, whilst returning home from night duty at Peterborough.
Sharon Garrett	Constable	48	6 June 2014	Whilst driving home from duty her car was involved in a collision with two other cars and a lorry. She sustained fatal injuries during the collision. DC Garrett joined Cambridgeshire Constabulary in 1991 and served in a number of roles, most recently investigating complex fraud offences in the economic crime unit

== Operations ==
The head of the constabulary is Chief Constable Simon Megicks, a former deputy chief constable of Norfolk Constabulary who came into the role as chief constable in September 2025. His deputies are Deputy Chief Constable Chris Balmer, formerly a temporary assistant chief constable of the Norfolk Constabulary, Assistant Chief Constable Vaughan Lukey, Assistant Chief Constable Leighton Hammett, and Temporary Assistant Chief Constable John Massey. One notable former chief constable is the current Lord Lieutenant of Cambridgeshire, Julie Spence, who was chief constable from 2005 to 2010.

The constabulary headquarters is based in the Huntingdon suburb of Hinchingbrooke, which is home to the force executive board, information management and the force control room. The constabulary also works together with eleven police stations throughout the local policing area. They are: Cambridge (known simply as Parkside, after the street it is based on), Sawston, Ely, Cambourne, St Ives, Huntingdon town, St Neots, March, Wisbech, Hampton and Peterborough (known as Thorpe Wood, after the local nature park). It has a local police training facility in the parish of Abbots Ripton, near Alconbury (known as Monks Wood, after the local national nature reserve). Construction is underway on a new police station in Milton to meet needs no longer met by Parkside station, built in the 60s and now beyond its functional age as a police facility. The fate of Parkside station remains undecided once construction of Milton station is complete, but a move to a new city centre location is desired.

In local policing management, the force area is subdivided into two areas (also called divisions) and are known simply as North and South. Northern local policing headquartered at Thorpe Wood, covers the city of Peterborough and the district of Fenland. Southern local policing is headquartered at Parkside, and it covers the districts of Cambridge City, South Cambridgeshire, East Cambridgeshire and Huntingdonshire.

== Governance ==
Prior to 2012, Cambridgeshire Constabulary was overseen by a police authority that comprised 17 members. This was made up of nine district councillors, of which seven were nominated by Cambridgeshire County Council and two by Peterborough City Council, three magistrates, nominated by the county's magistrates' courts committee; and five independent members, chosen from the community. However, In 2011 the Police Reform and Social Responsibility Act 2011 was passed by Parliament which abolished Police Authorities in favour of an elected police and crime commissioner (PCC). On 15 November 2012, elections took place in England and Wales to elect a PCC for each Police Area. In Cambridgeshire, the winning candidate was Conservative Sir Graham Bright, former MP for Luton. The Cambridgeshire PCC is scrutinised by the Cambridgeshire Police and Crime Panel, made up of elected councillors from the local authorities in the police area.

== PEEL inspection ==
His Majesty's Inspectorate of Constabulary and Fire & Rescue Services (HMICFRS) conducts a periodic police effectiveness, efficiency and legitimacy (PEEL) inspection of each police service's performance. In its latest PEEL inspection, Cambridgeshire Constabulary was rated as follows:

	Outstanding	Good	Adequate	Requires Improvement	Inadequate
2023/25 rating	Police powers and treating the public fairly and respectfully	Preventing and deterring crime and antisocial behaviour, and reducing vulnerability; Building, supporting and protecting the workforce	Investigating crime; Protecting vulnerable people	Leadership and force management	Responding to the public; Managing offenders and suspects; Tackling serious and organised crime

== In popular culture ==
In 2019, the constabulary was involved in the Channel 4 reality programme Famous and Fighting Crime where five personalities Penny Lancaster, Jamie Laing, Katie Piper, Sandi Bogle and Marcus Brigstocke acted as special constables for the force.

== See also ==
- Cambridgeshire Fire and Rescue Service
- East of England Ambulance Service
- Cambridge University Constabulary
- Law enforcement in the United Kingdom
- List of police forces of the United Kingdom
- List of law enforcement agencies in the United Kingdom, Crown Dependencies and British Overseas Territories
