= Simon Parr =

Simon Parr, is a former senior police officer of the United Kingdom. He held the post of chief constable of the Cambridgeshire Constabulary from September 2010 to 2015, replacing Julie Spence. Since his retirement, Parr took to acting at a local amateur theatre company, The Barn Theatre in Welwyn Garden City, where he is now chairman. He has starred in many productions since 2015 including, "A Christmas Carol", "Rubenstein Kiss" and Willy Russell "Our Day Out".

== Chief constable of Cambridgeshire ==
In early 2014, Parr was congratulated by Police Minister Damian Green for significantly reducing crime in the County since his appointment. As at May 2014, Parr is the National Policing Lead for Information Management. In March 2014, he was awarded the Queen's Police Medal for his work at Cambridgeshire, which featured a reorganisation of the force at the same time as significant cuts to its budget.

== Honours ==
Parr was awarded the Queen's Police Medal in the March 2014.

Ribbon	Description	Notes
	Queen's Police Medal (QPM)	March 2014.
	Queen Elizabeth II Golden Jubilee Medal	2002; UK Version of this Medal
	Queen Elizabeth II Diamond Jubilee Medal	2012; UK Version of this Medal
	Police Long Service and Good Conduct Medal	

Police appointments
Preceded by Julie Spence	Chief Constable of Cambridgeshire Constabulary; 2010–2015	Succeeded by Alec Wood
