= Isle of Ely Constabulary =

Defunct police force

The Isle of Ely Constabulary was the territorial police force responsible for law enforcement in the Isle of Ely area of Cambridgeshire from 1841-1965.

The force was merged with four other constabularies to form the Mid Anglia Constabulary on 1 April 1965.

== Chief Constables ==
- 1841-53: Captain Frederic Blagg Hampton
- 1853-79: Captain John William Foster
- 1879-1906: Lieutenant-Colonel William Brown-Ferris (died 14 April 1906)
- 1906-19: Captain John Harold Mander (appointed Chief Constable of Norfolk April 1916, continued to hold post in Isle of Ely until 1919)
- 1919-30: Major William Richard Monyns Hartcup OBE (died 12 August 1930)
- 1930-57: Captain J C T Rivett-Carnac MC (Chief Constable of Huntingdonshire and Isle of Ely)
- 1957-65: Thomas Christopher Williams (Chief Constable of Huntingdonshire and Isle of Ely) (became Chief Constable of West Sussex).
