= Peterborough City Police =

Law enforcement in Peterborough, England from 1874 to 1947

Agency overview
- Formed: 16 June 1874; 152 years ago
- Dissolved: 1 April 1947; 79 years ago

Jurisdictional structure
- Operations jurisdiction: Peterborough, England, UK
- Legal jurisdiction: England & Wales
- Constituting instrument: County and Borough Police Act 1856
- General nature: Local civilian police

Operational structure
- Headquarters: Milton Street, Peterborough
- Agency executive: William Hurst 1874-1889, John William Lawson 1889-1909, John Edward Ker Watson 1909-1915, Thomas Danby 1915-43, Francis George Markin 1943-47., Chief Constables
- Area Commands: Peterborough

The Peterborough City/Borough Police force was responsible for law enforcement in Peterborough, England, from 16 June 1874 to 1 April 1947, at which point it was merged with the Liberty of Peterborough Constabulary to form the Peterborough Combined Police.

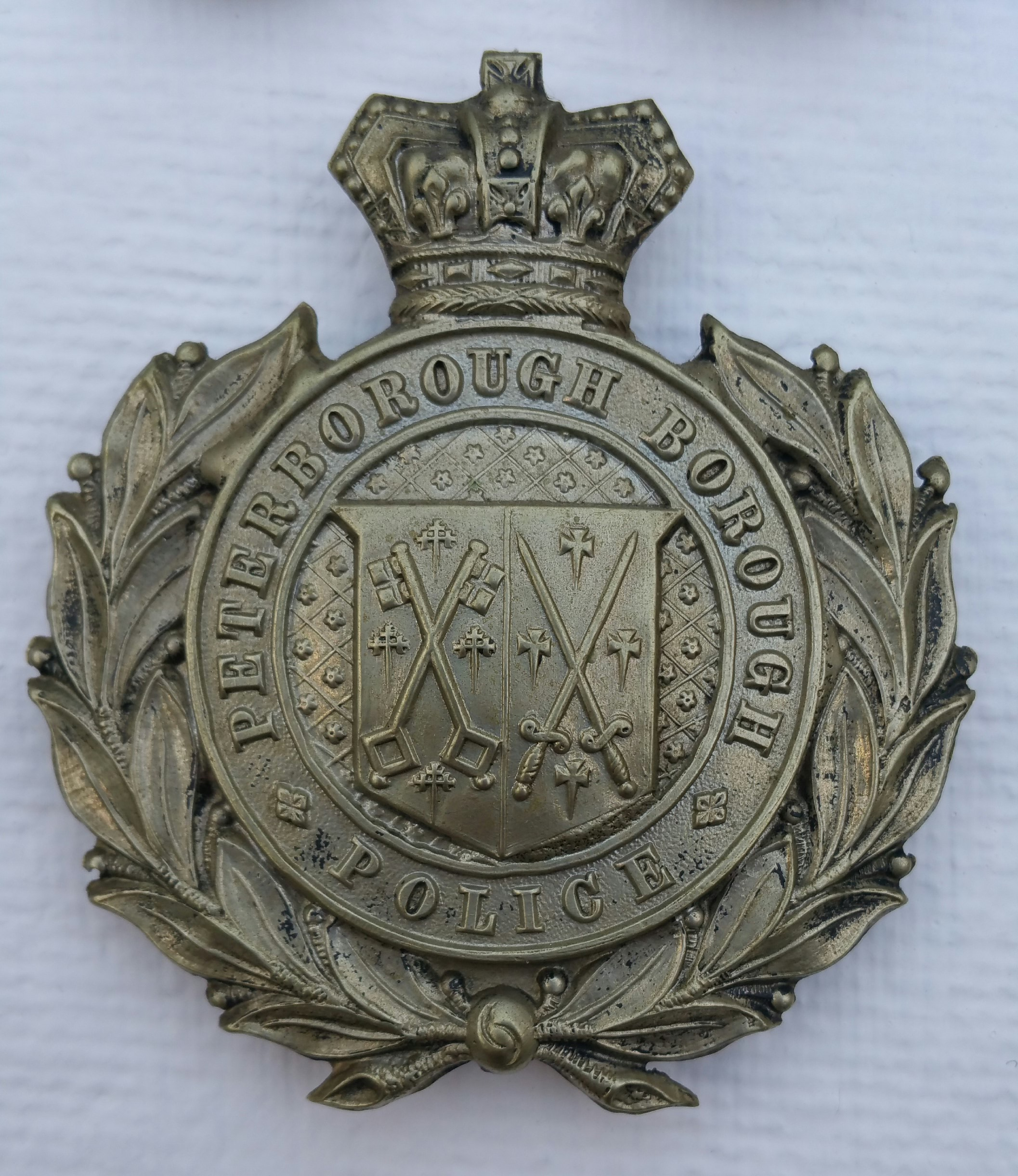
Queen Victoria Crown Peterborough City Police Badge 1874 - 1901

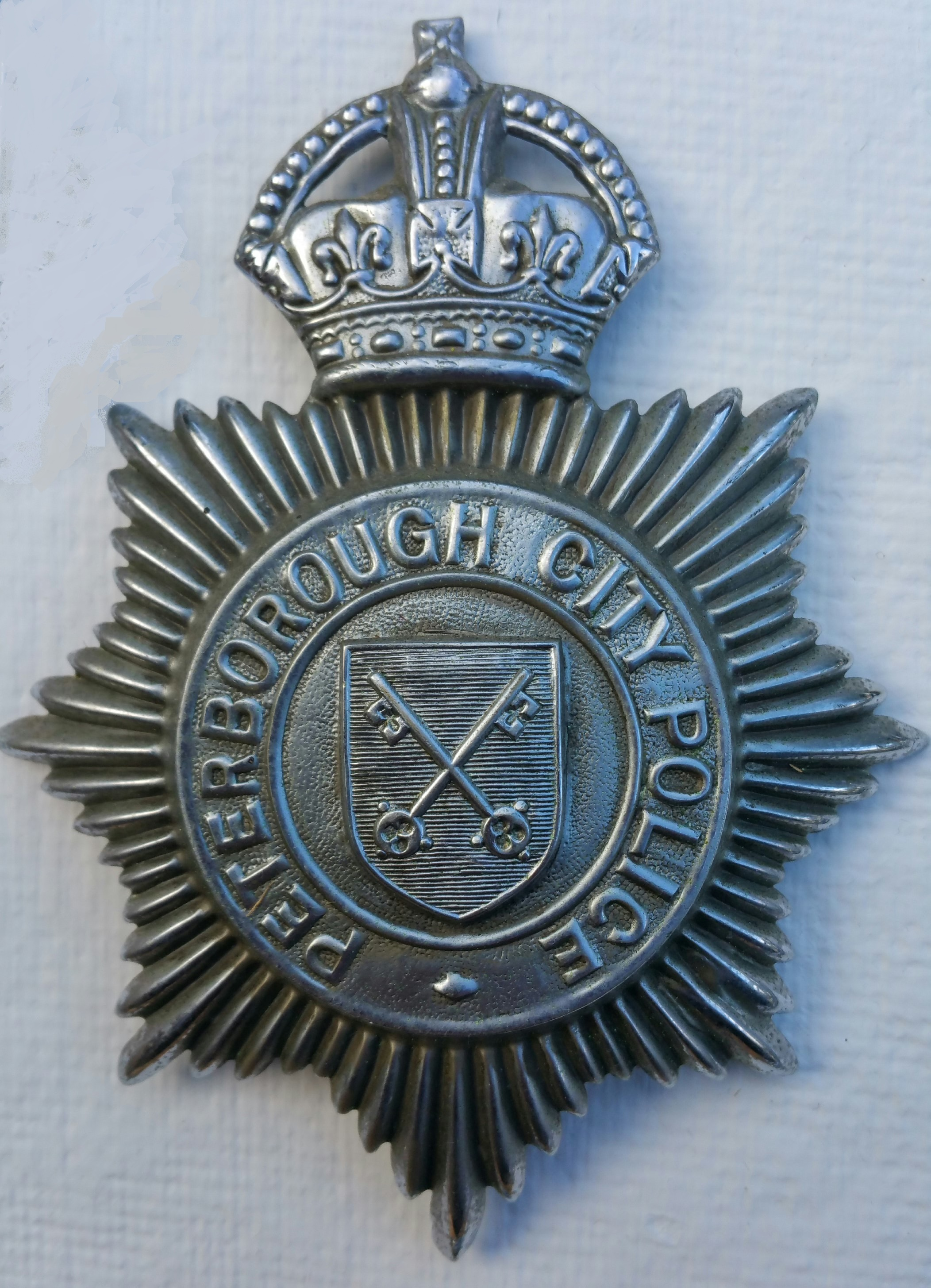
Kings Crown Peterborough City Police Badge 1943–1947.

== Chief Constables of The Peterborough City Police Force ==
- 1874 - 1889 William Hurst
- 1889 - 1909 John William Lawson
- 1909 - 1915 John Edward Ker Watson
- 1915 - 1943 Thomas Danby, also Chief Constable of The Liberty of Peterborough Constabulary.
- 1943 - 1947 Francis George Markin, also Chief Constable of The Liberty of Peterborough Constabulary.

== Sworn in Constables of the Peterborough Parish ==
On the Saturday 4 August 1860 at the Peterborough Petty Sessions and before the Rev William Strong (Chairman) and R.Mein, Esq. Nineteen local constables: W.Barber, T.Carnall, H.Gale, J.L.Lovell, W.Green, F.Mason, T.Squires, W.Templeman, S.Brakes, W.Chapman, J.Hobbs, D.Mitchell, R.Mason, C.Partlet, C.Smith, T.Wright, T.Woods, G.Edwards, and R.Arbeur.

== See also ==
- Liberty of Peterborough Constabulary
- Peterborough Combined Police
- Cambridgeshire Constabulary
- Policing in the United Kingdom
