= Roderick O'Donnell =

Roderick O'Donnell is an architectural historian, freelance writer and lecturer. O'Donnell has published extensively on the works of the English architects, Augustus Pugin (1812-1852) and his son and successor Edward Welby Pugin (1834-1875).

== Education and working life ==
O'Donnell, who studied at the University of Cambridge, has Master of Arts and Ph.D degrees.

From 1975 to 1978, he worked as a research assistant in Dublin for the Pevsner Architectural Guides 'Buildings of Ireland' series. From 1982, O'Donnell worked as an inspector at English Heritage and the public bodies that preceded it.

He was elected a Fellow of the Society of Antiquaries of London in 1999.

Since 2011, O'Donnell has worked as an architectural historian in a private capacity. He has written in academic journals and has also contributed to The Catholic Herald. He has given talks and lectures, for example, on Augustus Pugin at the University of Malta, and contributed to a book about Buckfast Abbey.

Some photographs, attributed to O'Donnell, are in the Conway Library at the Courtauld Institute of Art.

== Publications ==
=== Selected books as author and contributor ===
- The True Principles of Pointed or Christian Architecture and an Apology for the Revival of Christian Architecture, A.W. Pugin with an Introduction by Roderick O'Donnell, Gracewing Publishing, 2003: British Library General Reference Section YC.2004.a.1318
- The Present State of Ecclesiastical Architecture in England and some Remarks Relative to Architecture and Decoration, A.W. Pugin with an Introduction by Roderick O' Donnell, Gracewing Publishing, 2004. British Library General Reference Section YC.2005.a.2721
- The Pugins and the Catholic Midlands, Roderick O'Donnell, Gracewing Publishing, 2002. British Library General Reference Section YC.2003.a.1018
- Roderick O'Donnell, Pugin as a Church Architect in Paul Atterbury and Clive Wainwright (eds) Pugin: A Gothic Passion, Yale University Press, c.1994. British Library General Reference Section LB.31.b.9848
- Roderick O'Donnell, The Pugins in Ireland, in Paul Atterbury (ed) A. W. N. Pugin: Master of the Gothic Revival, Yale University Press, .c.1995. British Library General Reference Section YC.1996.c.4
- Roderick O'Donnell, Pugin's church in Cambridge, architectural sources and influences [and] Dunn and Hansom's church in Cambridge in Nicholas Rogers (ed) Catholics in Cambridge, 2003.British Library General Reference Section YC.2004.a.3203
- Roderick O'Donnell, E W Pugin, in Oxford Dictionary of National Biography, Lawrence Goldman (ed) vol 45, pp 525-6, 2001-2004.British Library General Reference Section YC.2009.b.1128
- Roderick O'Donnell, The Pugins and Belmont Abbey Church and Monastery, History and Architecture, in Belmont Abbey, celebrating one hundred and fifty years, Andrew Berry (ed), 2012. British Library General Reference Catalogue Section YC.2013.a.15488
- Roderick O'Donnell, AW Pugin at Ushaw, in Treasures of Ushaw College, Durham's Hidden Gem, James Kelly (ed), 2015. British Library General Reference Catalogue Section YKL.2016.b.4752
- Roderick O'Donnell, The Abbey church as first imagined and first built from Pugin to Dunn and Hansom, in Downside Abbey church an architectural history, Aidan Bellenger (ed), 2011. British Library General Reference Catalogue Section LC.31.b.10815
- Roderick O'Donnell,'FA Walters, archaeologist and architect, and the recreation of the monastic past’ in Buckfast Abbey: History, Art and Architecture, Peter Beacham, (ed) 2017. British Library General Reference Catalogue Section LC.31.b.10815
- Roderick O'Donnell,'An apology for the Revival: the architecture of the Catholic Revival in Britain and Ireland' in 'Gothic revival:religion, architecture and style in western Europe 1815-1915', Jan de Maeyer (ed) 2000.British Library General Reference Collection m02/35118.
- Roderick O'Donnell [with Tessa Murdoch],'Baroque Revival in a cold climate', Introduction to Mark Sagona and Adrian Gatt,'Ecleticism and the Baroque Revival in the Decorative Arts in Malta,2024,https://www.midseabooks.com/shop/maltas-architecture/art/eclecticism-and-the-baroque-revival-in-the-decorative-arts-in-malta-the-context-for-abramo-gatt-1863-1944/

=== Selected articles ===
- Extra Illustrations of Pugin Buildings in T.H. King's 'Les Vrais Principes'' by Roderick O''Donnell, Architectural History: Journal of the Society of Architectural Historians of Great Britain. VOL 44; 2001, 57-63. British Library General Reference Section, Journal ISSN: 0066-622X
- A number of scholarly articles on ecclesiastic history, art and architecture in the journals Architectural History and The Burlington Magazine.
