= Territorial police force =

Police body covering a specific geographic area

A territorial police force is a police service that is responsible for an area defined by sub-national boundaries, distinguished from other police services which deal with the entire country or a type of crime. In countries organized as federations, police responsible for individual sub-national jurisdictions are typically called state or provincial police.

== Canada ==
The Royal Canadian Mounted Police (RCMP/GRC) is the federal-level police service. It also acts as the provincial police service in every province except for Ontario, and Quebec, which operate provincial police services, as well as Newfoundland and Labrador, which is served by the Royal Newfoundland Constabulary. The RCMP is also contracted to act as the territorial police force in Nunavut, Yukon and the Northwest Territories in addition to being the federal police force in those Canadian territories.

== Spanish Sahara ==
A separate Sahrawi indigenous unit serving the Spanish colonial government was the Policia Territorial. This gendarmerie corresponded to the Civil Guard in metropolitan Spain. It was commanded by Spanish officers and included Spanish personnel of all ranks.

== United Kingdom ==
In the United Kingdom (UK) the phrase is gaining increased official (but not yet statutory) use to describe the collection of forces responsible for general policing in areas defined with respect to local government areas. The phrase "Home Office Police" is commonly used but this is often inaccurate or inadequate as the words naturally exclude forces outside England and Wales, but include some special police forces over which the Home Secretary has some power.

The police forces referred to as "territorial" are those whose police areas are defined by:

- Police Act 1996 – England and Wales, later legislation matched the Metropolitan Police District to the boundary of Greater London
- Police and Fire Reform (Scotland) Act 2012 – Scotland
- Police (Northern Ireland) Act 2000 – Northern Ireland (renaming the Royal Ulster Constabulary the Police Service of Northern Ireland without changing the area served)

Members of territorial police forces have jurisdiction in one of the three distinct legal systems of the United Kingdom – either England and Wales, Scotland or Northern Ireland. A police officer of one of the three legal systems has all the powers of a constable throughout their own legal system but limited powers in the other two legal systems. Certain exceptions where full police powers cross the border with the officer are when officers are providing planned support to another force such as the G8 Conference in Scotland in 2005 or COP26 officers of the Metropolitan Police who are on protection duties anywhere in the United Kingdom and when taking a person to or from a prison.

== United Nations ==
The United Nations (UN) has operated territorial police forces in those parts of countries which have been under control of the UN from time to time. These were usually formed from police personnel on loan from member countries. A recent example is the use of such a force in East Timor in substitution for Indonesian National Police.
