= Peterborough =

City in Cambridgeshire, England

Coordinates: 52°33′58″N 00°14′11″W

- City
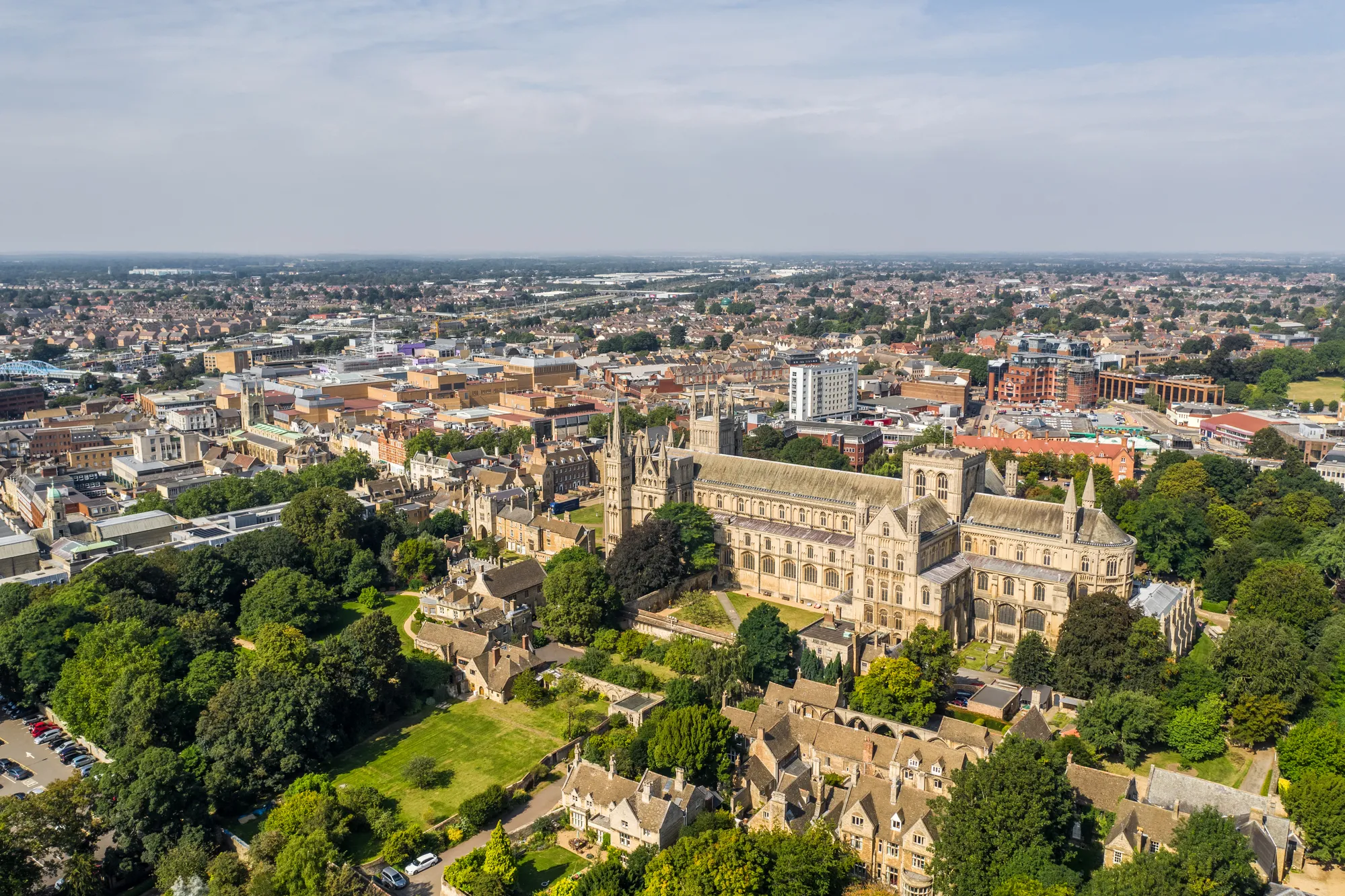
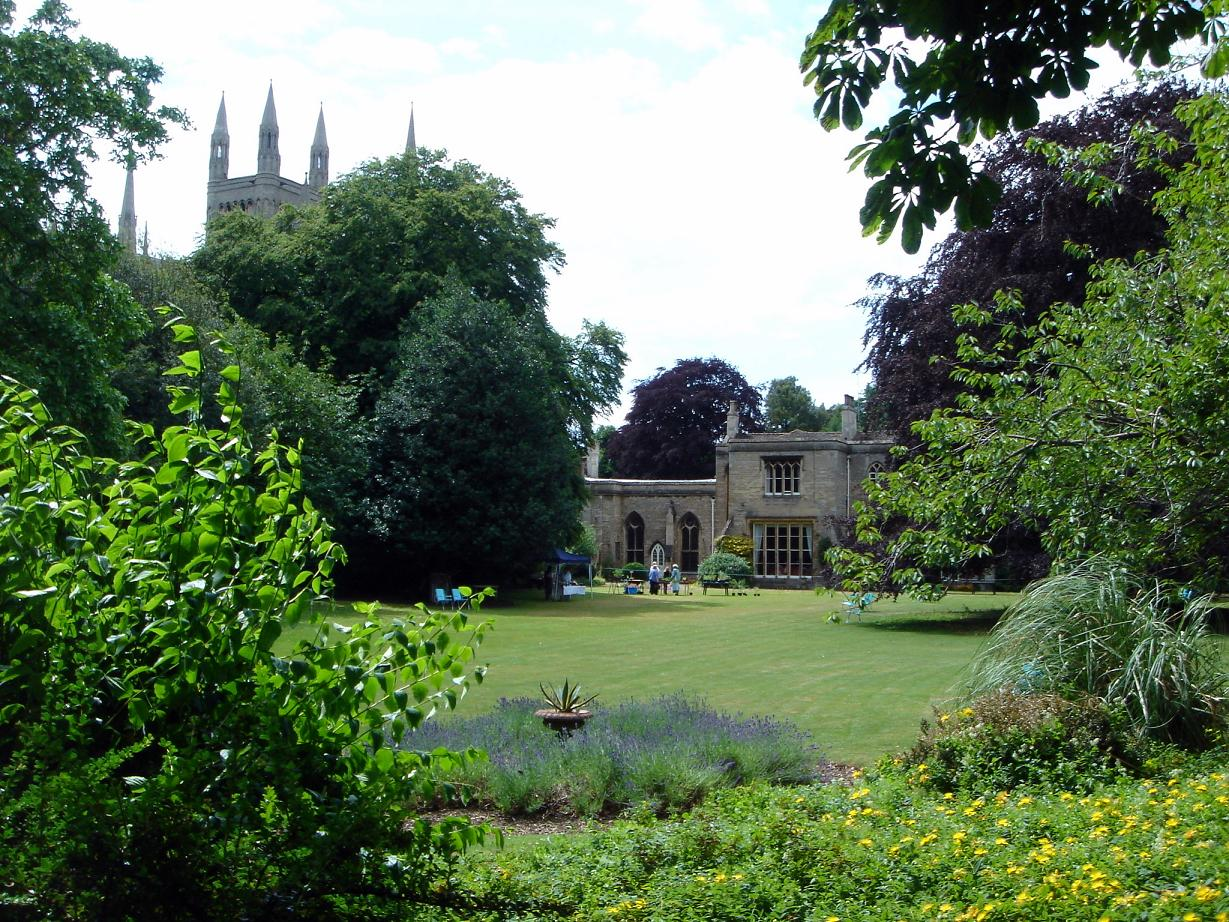
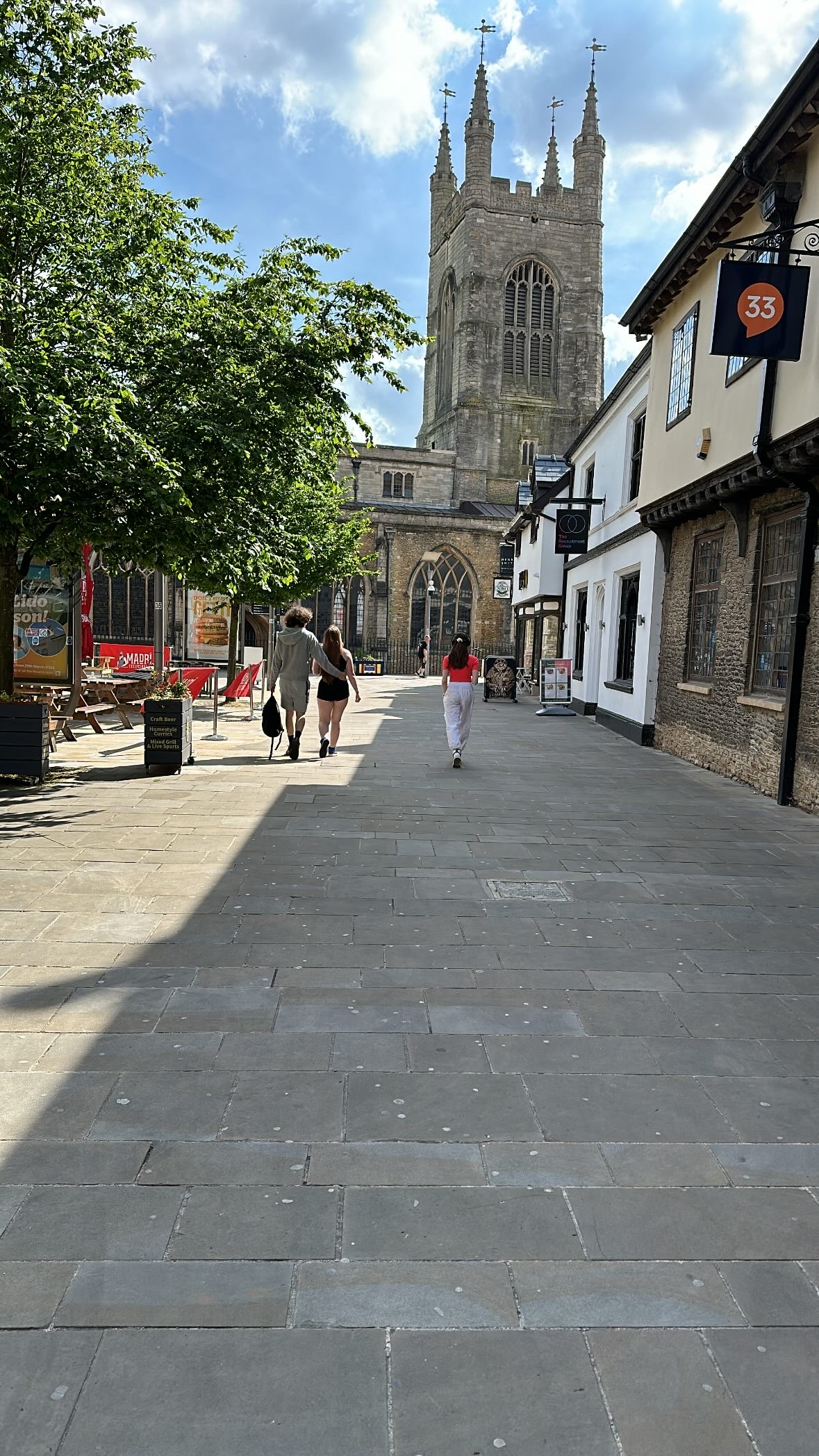
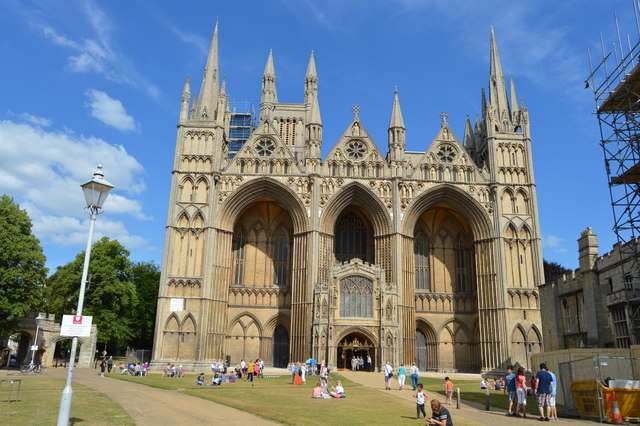
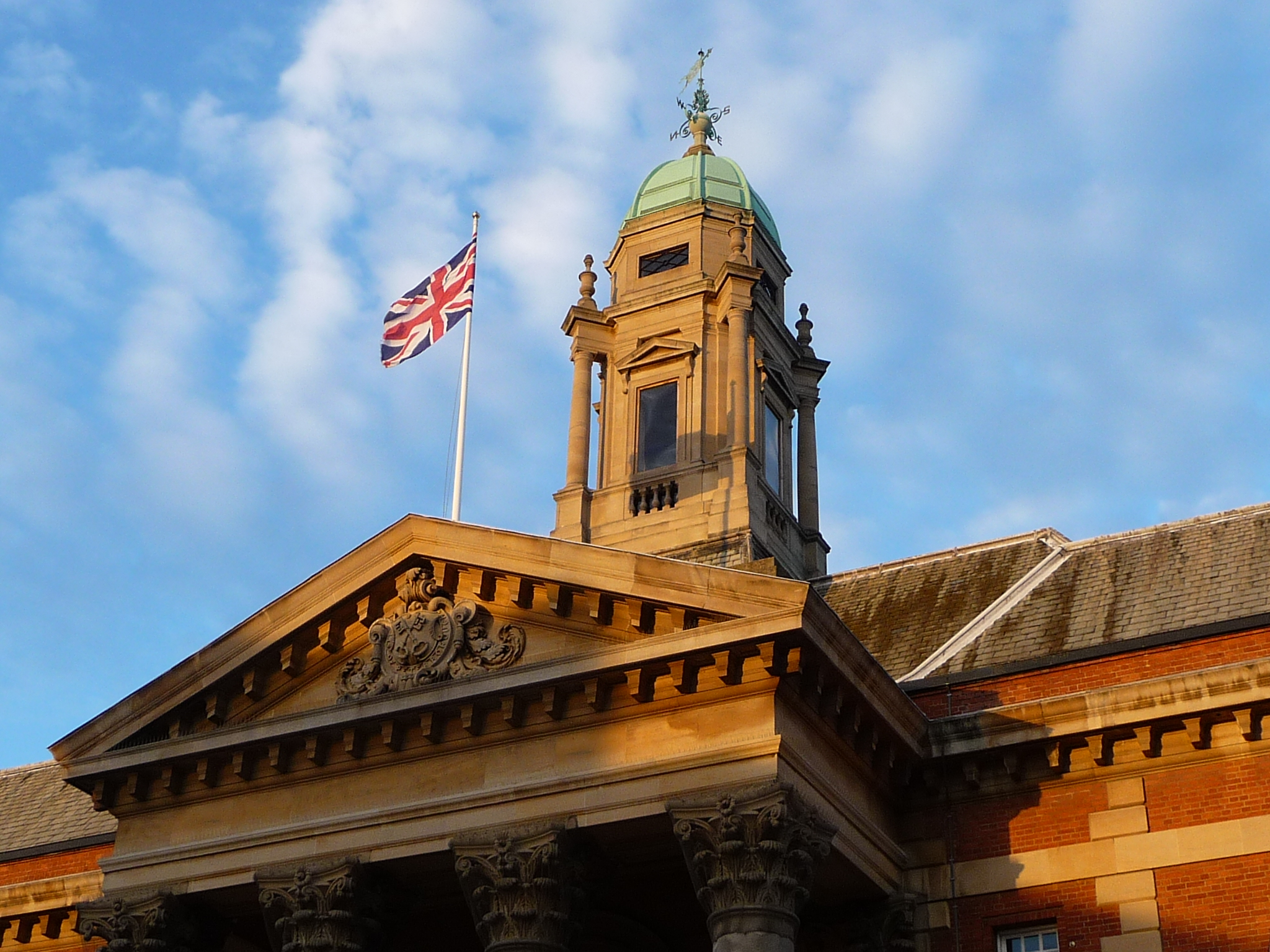
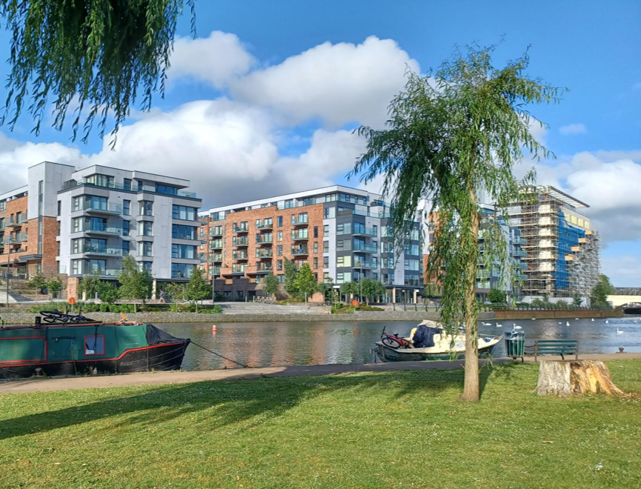
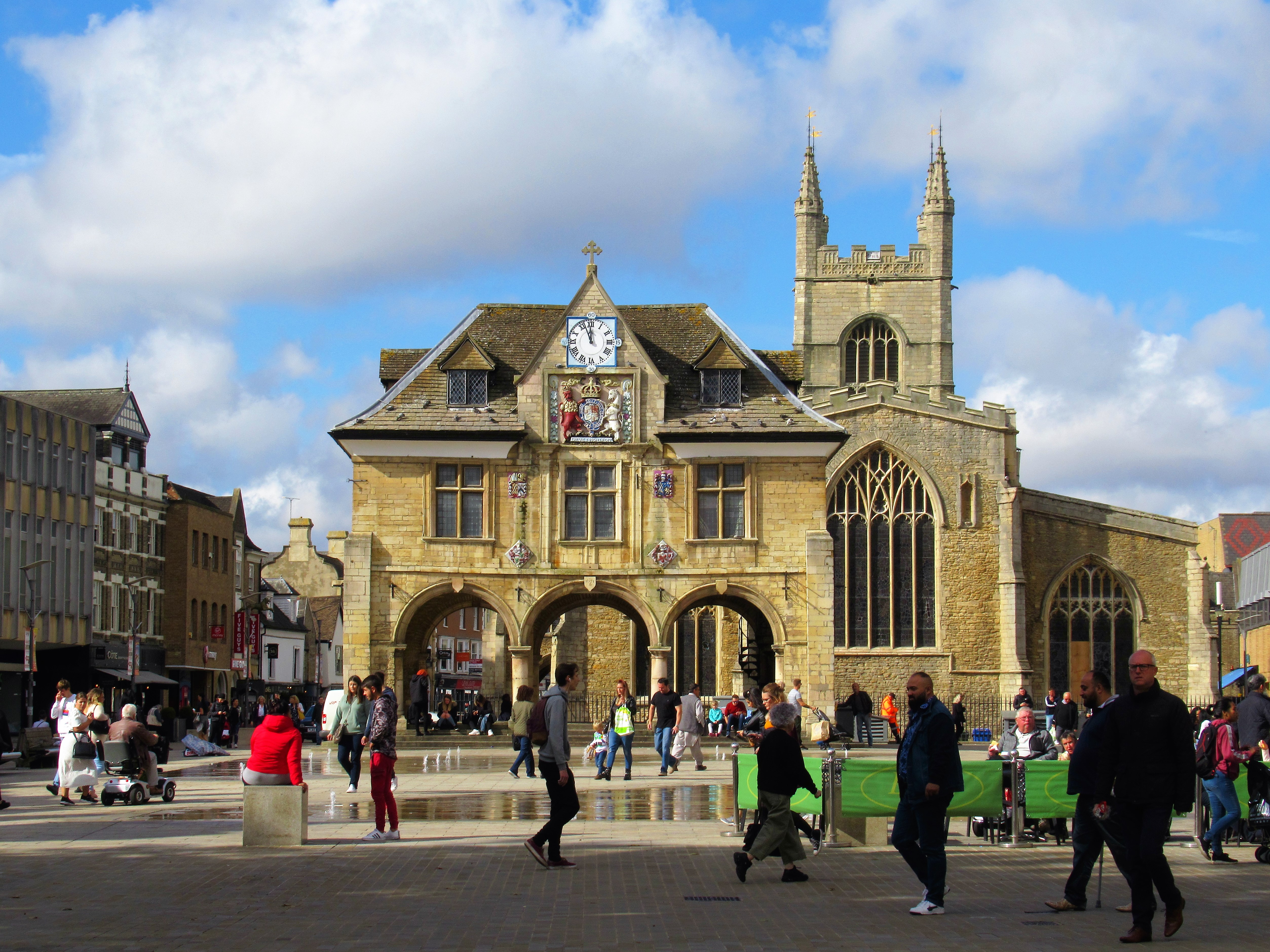
- Skyline Deanery Garden Cumbergate Cathedral Town Hall Fletton Quays Guildhall

- Location within Cambridgeshire
- Population: 219,510 (2023)
- OS grid reference: TL 19204 98638
- Unitary authority: City of Peterborough
- Shire county: Cambridgeshire
- Region: East
- Country: England
- Sovereign state: United Kingdom
- Post town: PETERBOROUGH
- Postcode district: PE1–PE8
- Dialling code: 01733
- Police: Cambridgeshire
- Fire: Cambridgeshire
- Ambulance: East of England
- UK Parliament: Peterborough
- Website: peterborough.gov.uk

Peterborough (/ˈpiːtərbərə, -bʌrə/ PEE-tər-bər-ə, -burr-ə) is a cathedral city in the City of Peterborough district in the ceremonial county of Cambridgeshire, England. The city is 74 miles (119 km) north of London, on the River Nene. As of the 2021 census, the Peterborough urban area had a population of 192,178, In 2023, the Peterborough City Council estimated the population of the wider district to be 219,510.

Human settlement in the area began before the Bronze Age, as can be seen at the Flag Fen archaeological site to the east of the city centre. There is evidence of Roman occupation. The Anglo-Saxon period saw the establishment of a monastery, Medeshamstede, which later became Peterborough Cathedral. In the 19th century, the population grew rapidly after the coming of the railway. The area became known for its brickworks and engineering. After the Second World War, industrial employment fell and growth was limited until Peterborough was designated a new town in the 1960s. The main economic sectors now are financial services and distribution.

The city was the administrative centre of the Soke of Peterborough in the historic county of Northamptonshire, until the Soke was abolished in 1965. From 1965 to 1974, it formed part of the short-lived county of Huntingdon and Peterborough and since then has been part of Cambridgeshire.

The cathedral city of Ely is 24 miles (39 km) east-southeast across the Fens and the university city of Cambridge is 30 miles (48 km) to the southeast. The local topography is flat and in places the land lies below sea level.

== History ==
=== Toponymy ===
The original name of the town was Medeshamstede. The town's name changed to Burgh from the late tenth century, possibly after Abbot Kenulf had built a defensive wall around the abbey, which was dedicated to Saint Peter; eventually this developed into the form Peterborough. In the 12th century the town was also known as Gildenburgh, which is found in the Peterborough version of the Anglo-Saxon Chronicle (see Peterborough Chronicle below) and a history of the abbey by the monk Hugh Candidus. The town does not appear to have been a borough until at least the 12th century.

=== Early history ===
Peterborough and its surrounding areas have been inhabited for thousands of years because it is where permanently drained land in The Fens is created by the River Nene. Remains of Iron Age settlement and what is thought to be religious activity can be seen at the Flag Fen archaeological site to the east of the city centre. The Romans established a fortified garrison town at Durobrivae on Ermine Street, five miles (8.0 km) to the west in Water Newton, around the middle of the 1st century AD. Durobrivae's earliest appearance among surviving records is in the Antonine Itinerary of the late 2nd century. There was also a large 1st century Roman fort at Longthorpe, designed to house half a legion, or about 3,000 soldiers; it may have been established as early as around AD 44–48. Peterborough was an important area of ceramic production in the Roman period, providing Nene Valley Ware that was traded as far away as Cornwall and the Antonine Wall, Caledonia.

Peterborough is shown by its original name Medeshamstede to have possibly been an Anglian settlement before AD 655, when Sexwulf founded a monastery on land granted to him for that purpose by Peada of Mercia, who converted to Christianity and was briefly ruler of the smaller Middle Angles sub-group. His brother Wulfhere murdered his own sons, similarly converted and then finished the monastery by way of atonement.

Hereward the Wake rampaged through the town in 1069 or 1070. Outraged, Abbot Turold erected a fort or castle, which, from his name, was called Mont Turold: this mound, or hill, is on the outside of the deanery garden, now called Tout Hill, although in 1848 Tot-hill or Toot Hill. The abbey church was rebuilt and greatly enlarged in the 12th century. The Peterborough Chronicle, a version of the Anglo-Saxon one, contains unique information about the history of England after the Norman conquest, written here by monks in the 12th century. This is the only known prose history in English between the conquest and the later 14th century. The burgesses received their first charter from "Abbot Robert" – probably Robert of Sutton (1262–1273). The place suffered materially in the war between King John and the confederate barons, many of whom took refuge in the monastery here and in Crowland Abbey, from which sanctuaries they were forced by the king's soldiers, who plundered the religious houses and carried off great treasures. The abbey church became one of Henry VIII's retained, more secular, cathedrals in 1541, having been assessed at the Dissolution as having revenue of £1,972.7s.0¾d per annum.

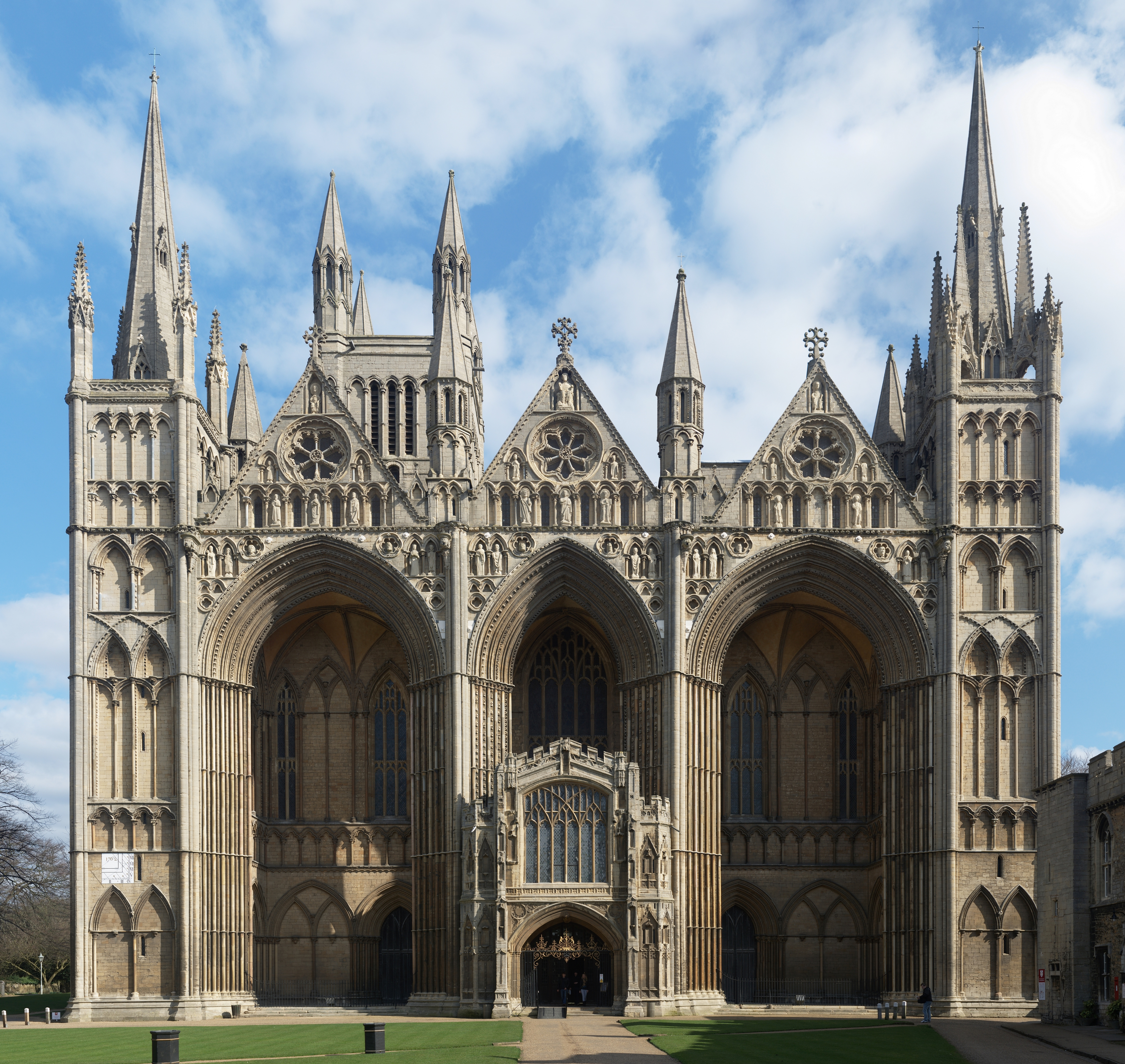
Peterborough Cathedral (1118–1375), the Early English Gothic west front

When civil war broke out, Peterborough was divided between supporters of King Charles I and the Long Parliament. The city lay on the border of the Eastern Association of counties which sided with Parliament, and the war reached Peterborough in 1643 when soldiers arrived in the city to attack Royalist strongholds at Stamford and Crowland. The Royalist forces were defeated within a few weeks and retreated to Burghley House, where they were captured and sent to Cambridge. While the Parliamentary soldiers were in Peterborough, however, they ransacked the cathedral, destroying the Lady Chapel, chapter house, cloister, high altar and choir stalls, as well as mediaeval decoration and records.

Among the privileges claimed by the abbot as early as the 13th century was that of having a prison for felons taken in the Soke of Peterborough, a liberty within Northamptonshire. This afforded it administrative and judicial independence from the rest of the county, with it having a quarter sessions separate from the rest of Northamptonshire from 1349. In 1576 Bishop Edmund Scambler sold the lordship of the hundred of Nassaburgh, which was coextensive with the Soke, to Queen Elizabeth I, who gave it to Lord Burghley, and from that time until the 19th century he and his descendants, the Earls and Marquesses of Exeter, had a separate gaol for prisoners arrested in the Soke. The abbot formerly held four fairs, of which two, St. Peter's Fair, granted in 1189 and later held on the second Tuesday and Wednesday in July, and the Brigge Fair, granted in 1439 and later held on the first Tuesday, Wednesday and Thursday in October, were purchased by the corporation from the Ecclesiastical Commissioners in 1876. The Bridge Fair, as it is now known, granted to the abbey by King Henry VI, survives. Prayers for the opening of the fair were once said at the morning service in the cathedral, followed by a civic proclamation and a sausage lunch at the town hall which still takes place. The mayor traditionally leads a procession from the town hall to the fair where the proclamation is read, asking all persons to "behave soberly and civilly, and to pay their just dues and demands according to the laws of the realm and the rights of the City of Peterborough".

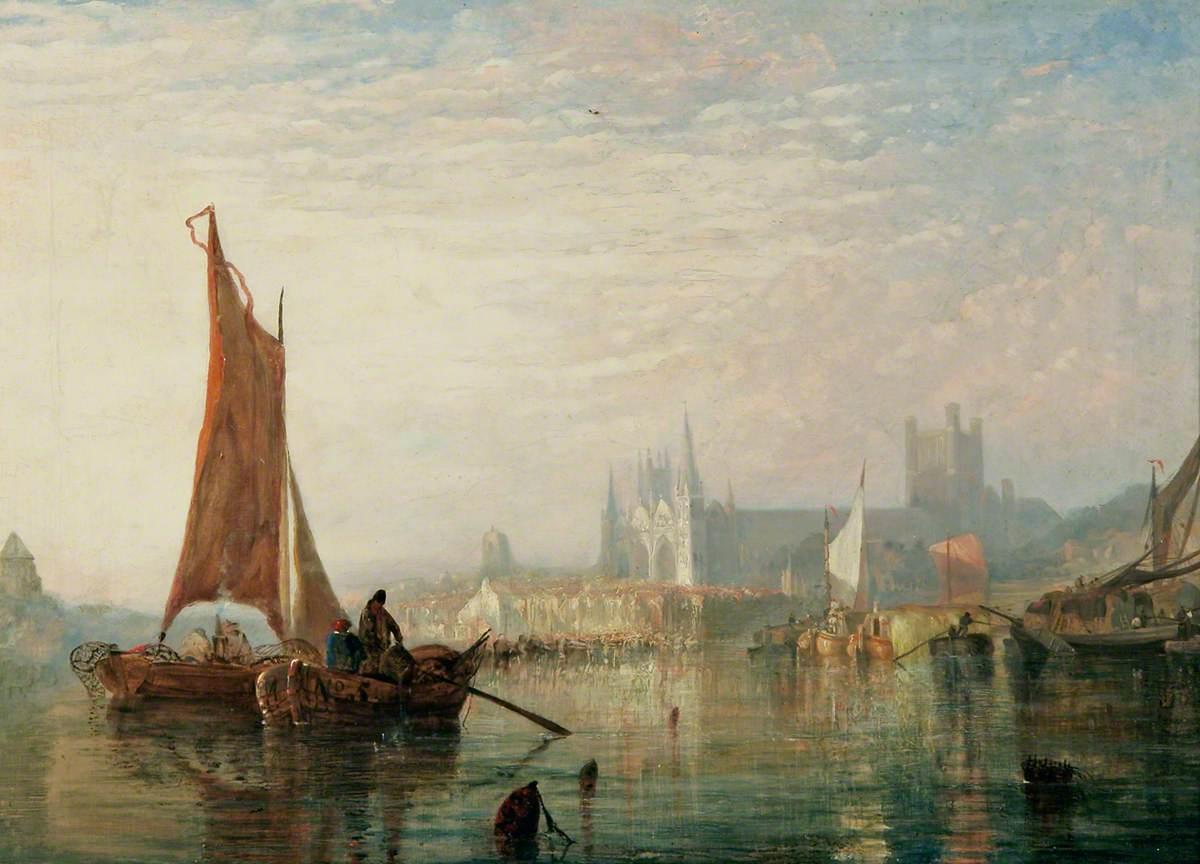
A view of Peterborough by Alfred George Stannard (1828–1885)

=== Industrialisation ===
Railway lines began operating locally during the 1840s, but it was the 1850 opening of the Great Northern Railway's line from London to York that transformed Peterborough from a market town to an industrial centre. Lord Exeter had opposed the railway passing through Stamford, so Peterborough, situated between two main terminals at London and Doncaster, increasingly developed as a regional hub.

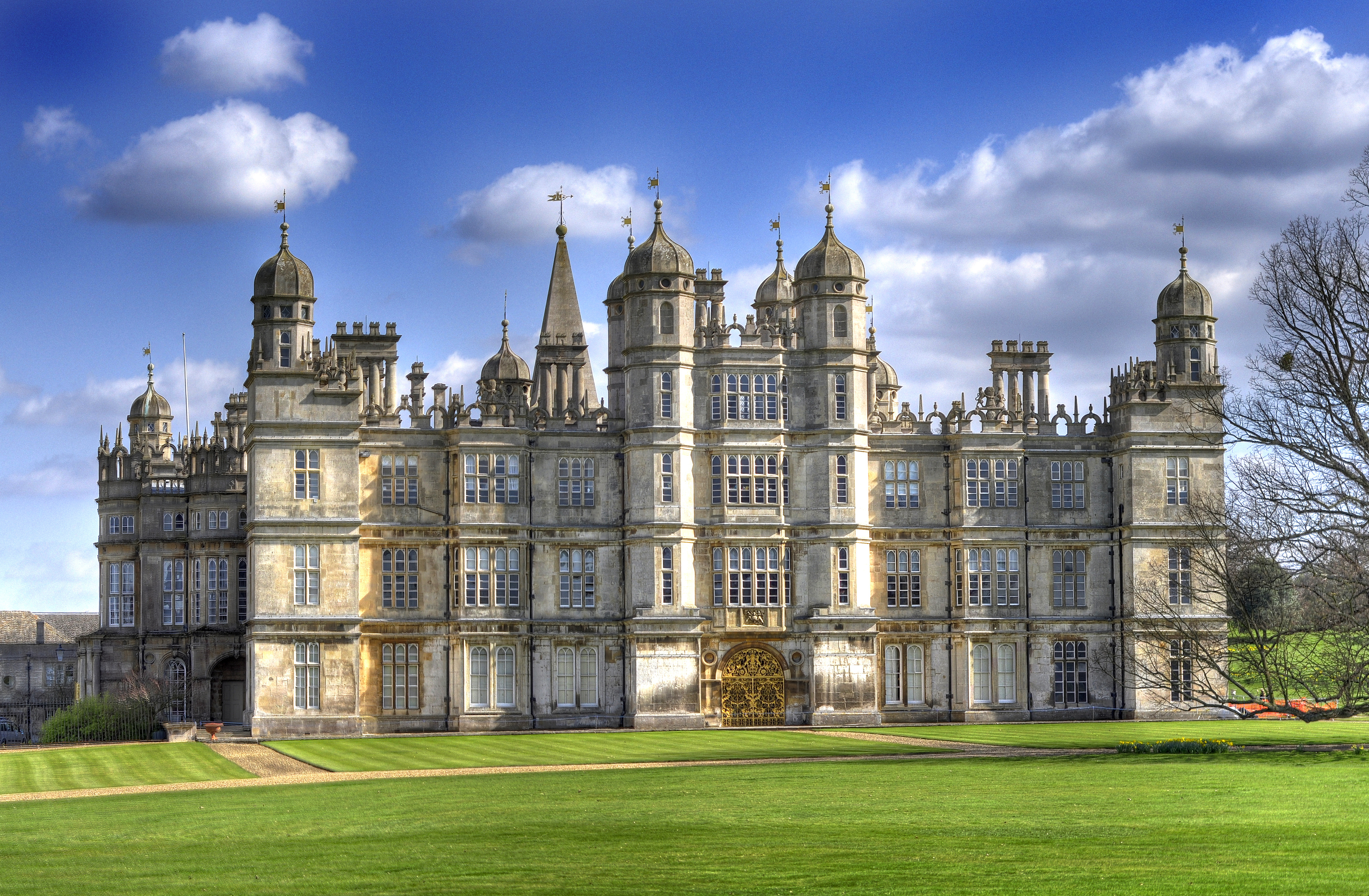
Burghley House (1555–1587), seat of the Marquess of Exeter, hereditary Lord Paramount of Peterborough

Coupled with vast local clay deposits, the railway enabled large scale brickmaking and distribution to take place. The area was the UK's leading producer of bricks for much of the twentieth century. Brick-making had been a small seasonal craft since the early nineteenth century, but during the 1890s successful experiments at Fletton using the harder clays from a lower level had resulted in a much more efficient process. The market dominance during this period of the London Brick Company, founded by the prolific Scottish builder and architect John Cathles Hill, gave rise to some of the country's most well-known landmarks, all built using the ubiquitous Fletton Brick. Perkins Engines was established in Peterborough in 1932 by Frank Perkins, creator of the Perkins diesel engine. Thirty years later it employed more than a tenth of the population of Peterborough, mainly at Eastfield. Baker Perkins had relocated from London to Westwood, now the site of HM Prison Peterborough, in 1903, followed by Peter Brotherhood to Walton in 1906; both manufacturers of industrial machinery, they too became major employers in the city. British Sugar has moved its headquarters to Hampton from Woodston and the beet sugar factory, which opened there in 1926, was closed in 1991.

=== Second World War ===
There were 50 raids on the city, with seven houses destroyed. At 11pm on 15 January 1941 five high explosives landed near Walpole Street and one man was killed. At 3.35am on 10 May 1941 four high explosives landed near Priestgate, with two men killed; RAF Wittering was also bombed at around 3.15am.

=== Modern History ===
On 22 August 1956 much of the old city centre was destroyed by the Great Fire of Peterborough. The blaze started in the Robert Sayle shop on the corner of Cowgate and King Street and spread to a shoe shop, furniture store and the local fire station. It caused more than £250,000 worth of damage and was extinguished with assistance from the USAF at Alconbury.

The Norwich and Peterborough (N&P) was formed by the merger of the Norwich Building Society and the Peterborough Building Society in 1986. It was the ninth-largest building society at the time of its merger into the Yorkshire Group in 2011. N&P continued to operate under its own brand administered at Lynch Wood until 2018. Prior to merger with the Midlands Co-op in 2013, Anglia Regional, the UK's fifth-largest cooperative society, was also based in Peterborough, where it had been established in 1876. The combined society began trading as Central England Co-operative in 2014.

Designated a New Town in 1967, Peterborough Development Corporation was formed in partnership with the city and county councils to house London's overspill population in new townships sited around the existing urban area. There were to be four townships, one each at Bretton (originally to be called Milton, a hamlet in the Middle Ages), Orton, Paston/ Werrington and Castor. The last of these was never built, but a fourth, called Hampton, is now taking shape south of the city. It was decided that the city should have a major indoor shopping centre at its heart. Planning permission was received in late summer 1976 and Queensgate, containing over 90 stores and including parking for 2,300 cars, was opened by Queen Beatrix of the Netherlands in 1982. 34 miles (55 km) of urban roads were planned and a network of high-speed landscaped thoroughfares, known as parkways, was constructed.

Peterborough's population grew by 45.4% between 1971 and 1991. New service sector companies like Thomas Cook and Pearl Assurance were attracted to the city, ending the dominance of the manufacturing industry as employers. An urban regeneration company named Opportunity Peterborough, under the chairmanship of Lord Mawhinney, was set up by the Office of the Deputy Prime Minister in 2005 to oversee Peterborough's future development. Between 2006 and 2012 a £1 billion redevelopment of the city centre and surrounding areas was planned. The master plan provided guidelines on the physical shaping of the city centre over the next 15–20 years. Proposals are still progressing for the north of Westgate, the south bank and the station quarter, where Network Rail is preparing a major mixed use development. Whilst recognising that the reconfiguration of the relationship between the city and station was critical, English Heritage found the current plans for Westgate unconvincing and felt more thought should be given to the vitality of the historic core.

In recent years Peterborough has undergone significant changes with numerous developments underway, most notably are Fletton Quays, a project to construct 350 apartments, various office spaces as well as a new home for Peterborough City Council with other projects within the development to include a Hilton Garden Inn hotel with a sky bar, a new passport office and various leisure, restaurant and retail opportunities. Other projects within the city include the extension to Queensgate Shopping Centre, The Great Northern Hotel and more recently plans to extend the railway station and long stay car park to facilitate more office space in the city centre and further parking.

== Governance ==
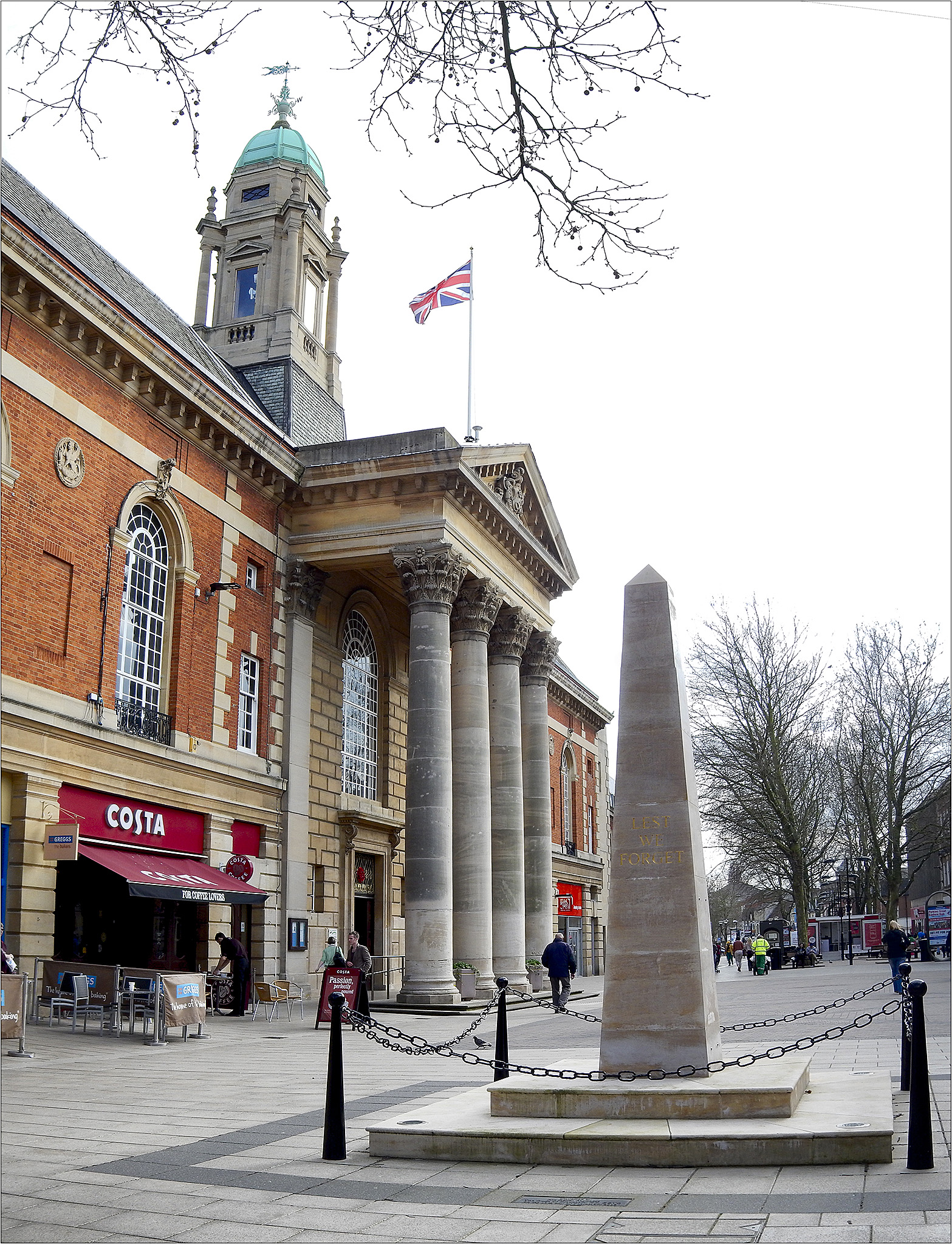
Peterborough Town Hall: Meeting place of the city council

There is one main tier of local government covering Peterborough, at unitary authority level, being Peterborough City Council, which meets at Peterborough Town Hall and has its main offices at Sand Martin House on Bittern Way. The city council is also a member of the Cambridgeshire and Peterborough Combined Authority, led by the directly elected Mayor of Cambridgeshire and Peterborough.

The area governed by the city council is the district of Peterborough, which extends beyond the urban area of Peterborough itself to include surrounding villages and rural areas, particularly to the north-west and north-east. Peterborough's city status is formally held by the local government district rather than the urban area. Much of the Peterborough urban area is unparished, but some of the suburbs are included in civil parishes, including Bretton, Hampton Hargate and Vale, Orton Longueville, and Orton Waterville.

=== Administrative history ===
Peterborough was an ancient parish, which was historically in the Nassaburgh hundred of Northamptonshire. The parish was divided into five hamlets or townships: Dogsthorpe, Eastfield, Longthorpe, Newark and a Peterborough township covering the central part of the parish including the town. Within the Peterborough township was an extra-parochial area known as the Minster Precincts, covering St Peter's Abbey and its close. When the former abbey church became Peterborough Cathedral in 1541, Peterborough was thereafter deemed to be a city. The area originally holding city status was the Peterborough township plus the Minster Precincts.

Although made a city in 1541, at that time Peterborough was not a borough (despite including the word in its name). Prior to the dissolution of the abbey in 1539, the abbey had been the manorial owner of the town; that ownership passed to the new cathedral authorities. A Peterborough constituency was also created in 1541, covering the same area as the city.

In 1790, a body of improvement commissioners was established to provide public services in the city. In 1874 Peterborough was incorporated as a municipal borough, with the commissioners replaced by an elected council initially comprising a mayor, six aldermen and eighteen councillors.

The municipal borough was abolished in 1974 when the modern district was created, being a lower tier non-metropolitan district, with the area also being transferred to Cambridgeshire at the same time. In 1998 the Peterborough district was removed from the non-metropolitan county of Cambridgeshire (the area governed by Cambridgeshire County Council) to become a unitary authority, whilst remaining part of the ceremonial county of Cambridgeshire for the purposes of lieutenancy and shrievalty.

== Geography ==
=== Climate ===
According to the Köppen classification the British Isles experience a maritime climate characterised by relatively cool summers and mild winters. Compared with other parts of the country, East Anglia is slightly warmer and sunnier in the summer and colder and frostier in the winter. Owing to its inland position, furthest from the landfall of most Atlantic depressions, Cambridgeshire is one of the driest counties in the UK, receiving, on average, around 600 mm (2.0 ft) of rain per year. The Met Office weather station at Wittering, within the unitary authority of Peterborough, recorded a maximum temperature of 39.9 °C (103.8 °F) on 19 July 2022. The lowest temperature in recent years was −13.4 °C (7.9 °F) during February 2012.

Climate data for Wittering, (Note: Weather station is located 8.9 miles (14.3 km) from the Peterborough city centre.) elevation: 73 m (240 ft), 1991–2020 normals, extremes 1957–present
| Month | Jan | Feb | Mar | Apr | May | Jun | Jul | Aug | Sep | Oct | Nov | Dec | Year |
|---|---|---|---|---|---|---|---|---|---|---|---|---|---|
| Record high °C (°F) | 15.1 (59.2) | 17.8 (64.0) | 23.1 (73.6) | 26.3 (79.3) | 32.6 (90.7) | 36.7 (98.1) | 39.9 (103.8) | 35.2 (95.4) | 31.0 (87.8) | 28.2 (82.8) | 17.5 (63.5) | 15.5 (59.9) | 39.9 (103.8) |
| Mean daily maximum °C (°F) | 7.1 (44.8) | 7.9 (46.2) | 10.4 (50.7) | 13.4 (56.1) | 16.5 (61.7) | 19.5 (67.1) | 22.1 (71.8) | 21.7 (71.1) | 18.7 (65.7) | 14.4 (57.9) | 10.1 (50.2) | 7.4 (45.3) | 14.1 (57.4) |
| Daily mean °C (°F) | 4.3 (39.7) | 4.6 (40.3) | 6.6 (43.9) | 9.0 (48.2) | 11.9 (53.4) | 14.9 (58.8) | 17.2 (63.0) | 17.0 (62.6) | 14.5 (58.1) | 10.9 (51.6) | 7.1 (44.8) | 4.6 (40.3) | 10.2 (50.4) |
| Mean daily minimum °C (°F) | 1.5 (34.7) | 1.4 (34.5) | 2.7 (36.9) | 4.6 (40.3) | 7.4 (45.3) | 10.3 (50.5) | 12.3 (54.1) | 12.3 (54.1) | 10.2 (50.4) | 7.4 (45.3) | 4.0 (39.2) | 1.8 (35.2) | 6.4 (43.5) |
| Record low °C (°F) | −13.9 (7.0) | −13.5 (7.7) | −12.0 (10.4) | −5.5 (22.1) | −1.3 (29.7) | 0.8 (33.4) | 5.2 (41.4) | 4.8 (40.6) | 1.0 (33.8) | −3.9 (25.0) | −7.6 (18.3) | −10.9 (12.4) | −13.9 (7.0) |
| Average precipitation mm (inches) | 47.0 (1.85) | 38.9 (1.53) | 39.0 (1.54) | 44.2 (1.74) | 49.6 (1.95) | 52.9 (2.08) | 55.5 (2.19) | 59.9 (2.36) | 52.9 (2.08) | 63.3 (2.49) | 57.5 (2.26) | 53.0 (2.09) | 613.6 (24.16) |
| Average precipitation days (≥ 1.0 mm) | 10.1 | 9.3 | 8.7 | 8.8 | 8.4 | 9.0 | 9.1 | 9.2 | 8.3 | 10.2 | 11.2 | 10.7 | 113.1 |
| Mean monthly sunshine hours | 63.4 | 86.2 | 124.8 | 167.9 | 204.9 | 195.3 | 207.1 | 192.9 | 151.8 | 113.0 | 73.7 | 64.2 | 1,645.1 |
Source 1: Met Office
Source 2: Starlings Roost Weather

=== Topography ===
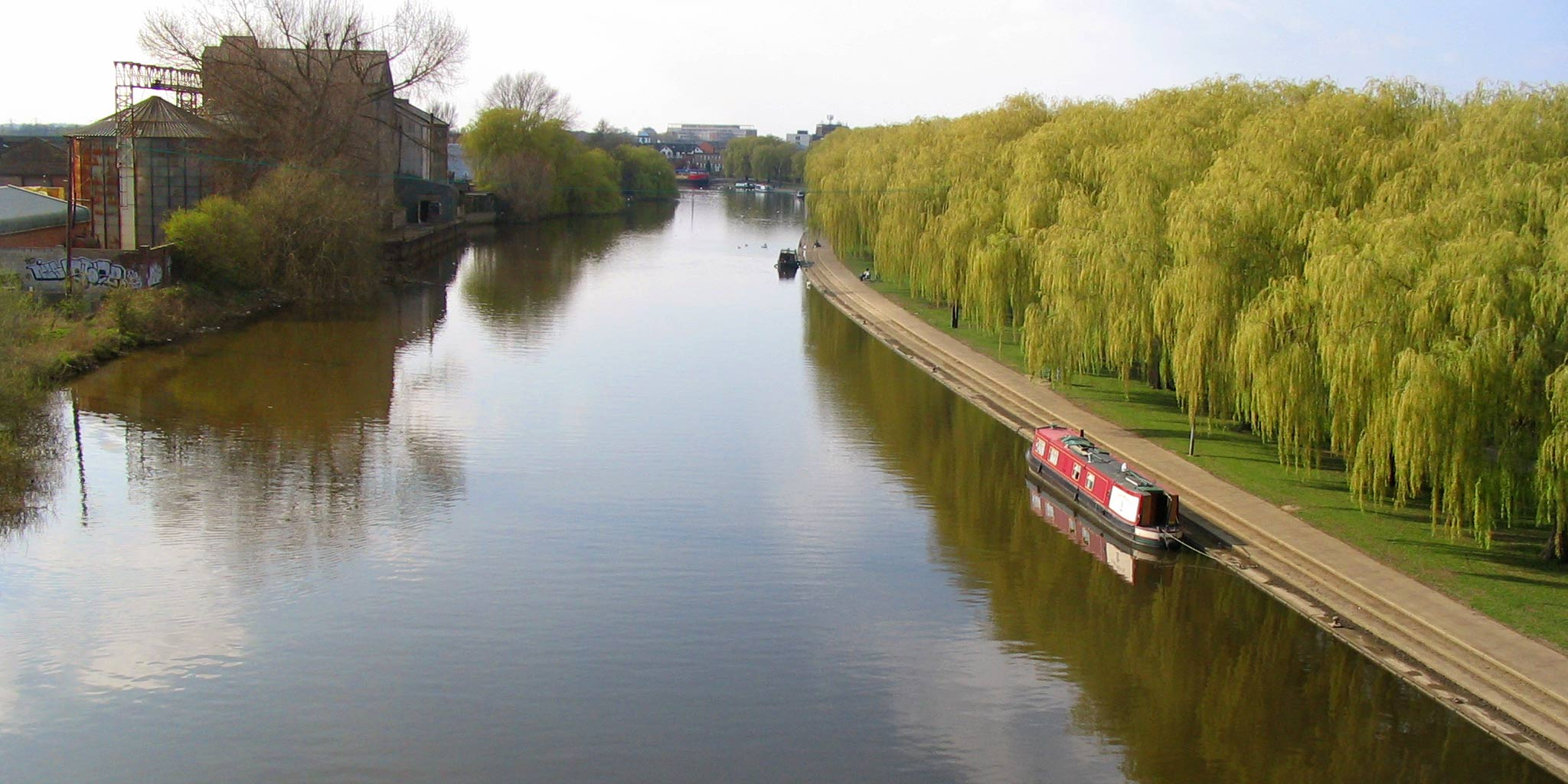
The River Nene embankment, seen from Frank Perkins Parkway

East Anglia is most notable for being almost flat (it is mainly on a floodplain). During the Ice Age much of the region was covered by ice sheets and this has influenced the topography and nature of the soils. Much of Cambridgeshire is low-lying, in some places below present-day mean sea level. The lowest point on land is supposedly just to the south of the city at Holme Fen, which is 2.75 metres (9.0 feet) below sea level. The largest of the many settlements along the Fen edge, Peterborough has been called the Gateway to the Fens. Before they were drained the Fens were liable to periodic flooding so arable farming was limited to the higher areas of the Fen edge, with the rest of the Fenland dedicated to pastoral farming. In this way, the mediaeval and early modern Fens stood in contrast to the rest of southern England, which was primarily arable. Since the advent of modern drainage in the nineteenth and twentieth centuries the Fens have been radically transformed such that arable farming has almost entirely replaced pastoral. The unitary authority extends north west to the settlements of Wothorpe and Wittering and east beyond Thorney into the historic Isle of Ely and includes the Ortons, south of the River Nene. It borders Northamptonshire to the west, Lincolnshire to the north, and the Cambridgeshire districts of Fenland and Huntingdonshire to the south and east. The city centre is located at 52°35'N latitude 0°15'W longitude or Ordnance Survey national grid reference TL 185 998.

==== Urban areas ====
Townships are in bold type. In addition to the surrounding villages, Bretton, Orton Longueville and Orton Waterville are parished. The city council also works closely with Werrington neighbourhood association which operates on a similar basis to a parish council.

Bretton – Dogsthorpe – Eastfield – Eastgate – Fengate – Fletton – Gunthorpe – The Hamptons – Longthorpe – Millfield – Netherton – Newark – New England – The Ortons – Parnwell – Paston – Ravensthorpe – Stanground – Walton – Werrington – West Town – Westwood – Woodston

==== Rural areas ====
Civil parishes do not cover the whole of England and mostly exist in rural hinterland. They are usually administered by parish councils which have various local responsibilities.

Ailsworth – Bainton – Barnack – Borough Fen – Castor – Deeping Gate – Etton – Eye – Eye Green – Glinton – Helpston – Marholm – Maxey – Newborough – Northborough – Peakirk – Southorpe – St. Martin's Without – Sutton – Thorney – Thornhaugh – Ufford – Upton – Wansford – Wittering – Wothorpe

These are further arranged into 24 electoral wards for the purposes of local government. 15 wards comprise the Peterborough constituency for elections to the House of Commons, while the remaining nine fall within the North West Cambridgeshire constituency.

=== Linguistics ===
Peterborough lies in the middle of several distinct regional accent groups and as such has a hybrid of Fenland East Anglian, East Midland and London Estuary English features. The city falls just north of the A vowel isogloss and as such most native speakers will use the flat A, as found in cat, in words such as last. Yod-dropping is often heard from Peterborians, as in the rest of East Anglia, for example new as /nuː/. However, the large number of newcomers has impacted greatly on the English spoken by the younger generation. Common so-called Estuary English features such as L-vocalisation, T glottalisation and Th-fronting give today's Peterborough accent a definite south-eastern sound.

=== Paleontology ===
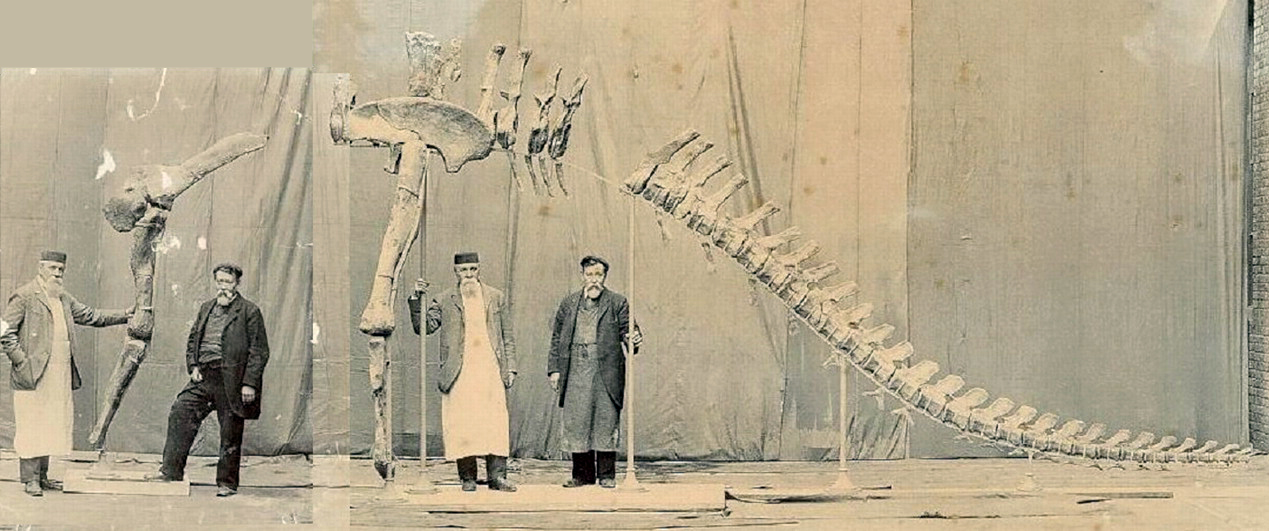
Historic photograph of the skeleton of the sauropod dinosaur Cetiosauriscus, excavated from Peterborough in 1898

Peterborough has long been known for fossils of Jurassic animals found in the Oxford Clay, particularly marine reptiles such as ichythyosaurs and plesiosaurs collected from brick pits in the area. In 1898, the skeleton of a sauropod dinosaur, later named Cetiosauriscus, was excavated from a pit near Fletton. The extinct Jurassic hybodont shark Planohybodus peterboroughensis was named after Peterborough in 2008.

== Demographics ==
=== Population ===
The City of Peterborough local authority area has a population of 224,757 (2025). It is forecast to reach 230,000 in 2031 and 240,000 by around 2041.

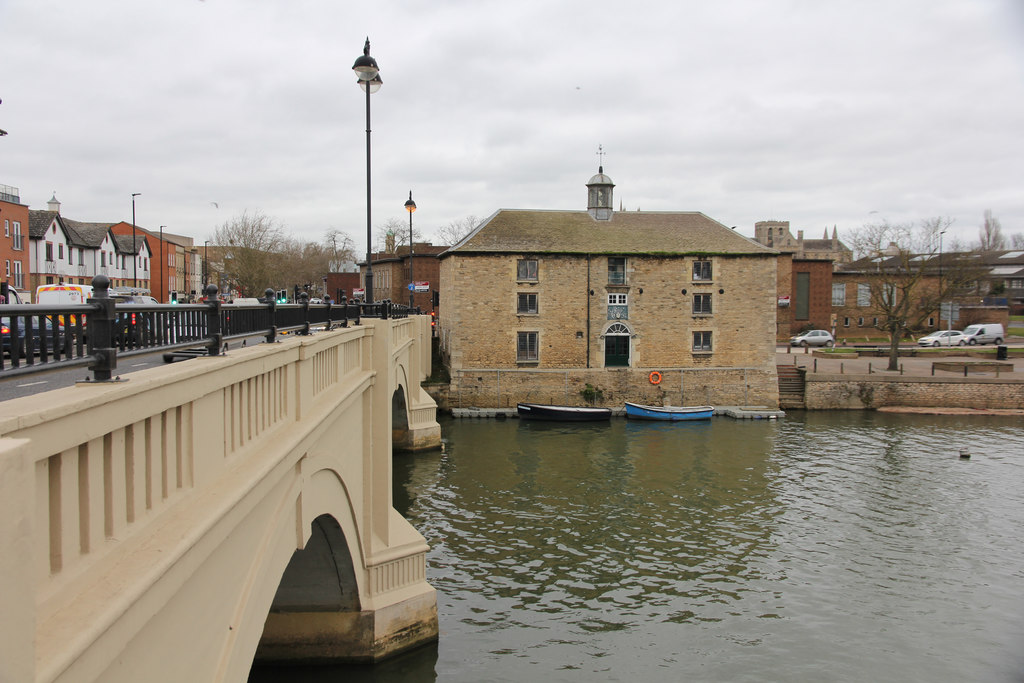
Customs House (1790) on the north bank of the river, from the Town Bridge

| Year | City | Soke | Redistricted |
|---|---|---|---|
| 1901 | 30,872 | 41,122 | 46,986 |
| 1911 | 33,574 | 44,718 | 53,114 |
| 1921 | 35,532 | 46,959 | 58,186 |
| 1931 | 43,551 | 51,839 | 63,745 |
| 1939 | 49,248 | 58,303 | 69,855 |
| 1951 | 53,417 | 63,791 | 76,555 |
| 1961 | 62,340 | 74,758 | 89,794 |
| 1971 | 69,556 | 85,820 | 105,323 |
| 1981 | 131,696 | | |
| 1991 | 155,050 | | |
| 2001 | 156,060 | | |
| 2011 | 183,600 (+ 16.6%) | | |
| 2021 | 215,700 (+17.5%) | | |

Peterborough's population growth was reportedly the second fastest of any British city, behind only Milton Keynes, over the ten years from 2004 to 2013, driven partly by immigration.

=== Ethnicity ===
According to the 2011 census, 82.5% of Peterborough's residents categorised themselves as white, 2.8% of mixed ethnic groups, 11.7% Asian, 2.3% black and 0.8% other. Amongst the white population, the largest categories were indigenous groups, those being English/Welsh/Scottish/Northern Irish/British (70.9%), and other white (10.6%). Those of Pakistani ethnicity accounted for 6.6% of the population and those of Indian ethnicity 2.5.%. The largest black group were those of African ethnicity (1.4%).

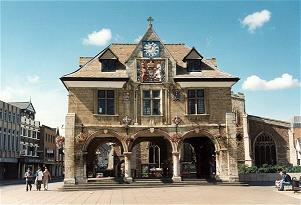
The Guildhall or Butter Cross (1669–1671), Cathedral Square, Peterborough

Peterborough is home to one of the largest concentrations of Italian immigrants in the UK. This is mainly as a result of labour recruitment in the 1950s by the London Brick Company in the southern Italian regions of Apulia and Campania. By 1960, approximately 3,000 Italian men were employed by London Brick, mostly at the Fletton works. In 1962, the Scalabrini Fathers, who first arrived in 1956, purchased an old school and converted it into a mission church named after the patron saint of workers Saint Joseph (San Giuseppe). By 1991, over 3,000 christenings of second-generation Italians had been carried out there. In 1996, it was estimated that the Italian community of Peterborough numbered 7,000, making it the third largest in the UK after London and Bedford. The 2011 Census recorded 1,179 residents born in Italy.

In the late twentieth century the main source of immigration was from new Commonwealth countries. The 2011 Census showed that a total of 24,166 migrants moved to Peterborough between 2001 and 2011. The city has experienced significant immigration from the A8 countries that joined the European Union in 2004, and in 2011, 14,134 residents of the city were people born in Central and Eastern Europe.

According to a report published by the police in 2007, recent migration had resulted in increased translation costs and a change in the nature of crime in the county, with an increase in drink driving offences, knife crime and an international dimension added to activities such as running cannabis factories and human trafficking. The number of foreign nationals arrested in the north of the county rose from 894 in 2003, to 2,435 in 2006, but the report also said that "inappropriately negative" community perceptions about migrant workers often complicate routine incidents, raising tensions and turning them "critical". It also noted there was "little evidence that the increased numbers of migrant workers have caused significant or systematic problems in respect of community safety or cohesion". In 2007, Julie Spence, the then Chief Constable emphasised that the fact that the demographic profile of Cambridgeshire had changed dramatically from one where 95% of teenagers were white four years previously to one of the country's fastest growing diverse populations, and said it had a positive impact on development and jobs. In 2008, the BBC broadcast The Poles are Coming!, a documentary on the impact of Polish migration to Peterborough by Tim Samuels, as part of its White Season.

The number of languages in use is growing where previously few languages other than English were spoken. As of 2006, Peterborough offered classes in Italian, Urdu and Punjabi in its primary schools.

=== Religion ===
Religion in Peterborough (2021 census)
1. Christianity (46.2%)
2. No religion (32.5%)
3. Islam (12.2%)
4. Not stated (5.80%)
5. Hinduism (1.80%)
6. Sikhism (0.60%)
7. Buddhism (0.30%)
8. Judaism (0.10%)
9. Other religions (0.50%)

The 2021 census marked the first time Christianity had become a plurality instead of a majority in Peterborough. This is due to the rise of irreligion going from 24.6% in 2011 to 32.5% in 2021 making up almost 1/3 of the city's population. Islam is also rising, going from 9.4% in 2011 to 12.2% in 2021 with its followers in Peterborough mainly being of Pakistani descent. Hinduism had a slight increase going from 1.5% in 2011 to 1.8% in 2021. The percentage Of Jews, Buddhists and Sikhs have stayed the same since 2011. The number of people not stating their religion is decreasing, going from 6.7% in 2011 to 5.8% in 2021.

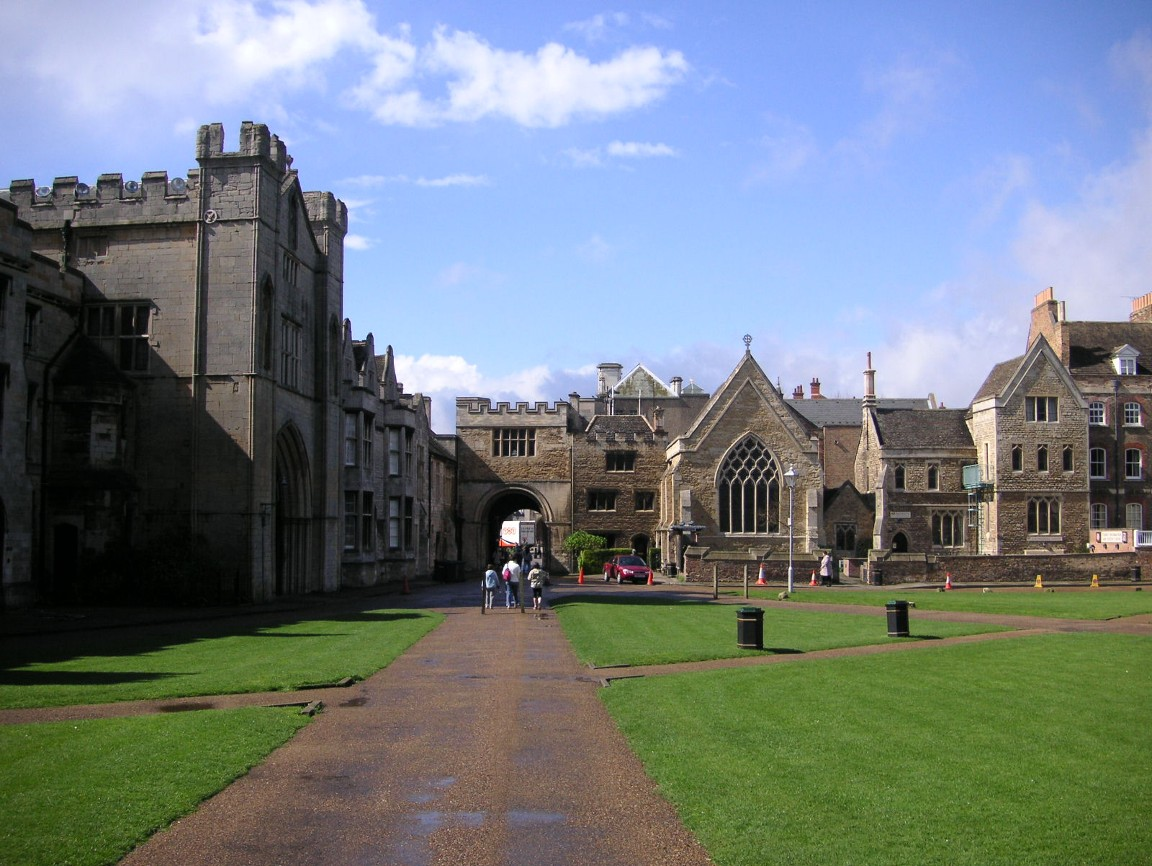
Norman gateway below the chapel of St. Nicholas (1177–1194), Minster Precincts

Other Christian denominations are also in evidence; the latest church to be constructed is a £7 million "superchurch," KingsGate, formerly Peterborough Community Church, which can seat up to 1,800 worshippers. In comparison with the rest of England, Peterborough has a lower proportion of Christians, Buddhists, Hindus, Jews and Sikhs. The city has a higher percentage of Muslims than England as a whole (9.4% compared to 5% nationally). The majority of Muslims reside in the Millfield, West Town and New England areas of the city, where two large mosques (including the Faidhan-e-Madina Mosque and Husaini Islamic Center-Peterborough) are based. Peterborough also has both Hindu (Bharat Hindu Samaj) and Sikh (Singh Sabha Gurdwara) temples in these areas.

The Anglican Diocese of Peterborough covers roughly 1,200 square miles (3,100 km^{2}), including the whole of Northamptonshire, Rutland and the Soke of Peterborough. The parts of the city that lie south of the river, which were historically in Huntingdonshire, fall within the Diocese of Ely, which covers the remainder of Cambridgeshire and western Norfolk. The current Bishop of Peterborough has been appointed Assistant Bishop in the Diocese of Ely, with pastoral care for these parishes delegated to her by the Bishop of Ely. The city falls wholly within the Roman Catholic Diocese of East Anglia (which has its seat at the Cathedral Church of Saint John the Baptist, Norwich) and is served by Saint Peter and All Souls Church, built in 1896 and decorated in the Gothic style. The Greek Orthodox Community of Saint Cyril, Patriarch of Jerusalem was established in 1991 under the Orthodox Archdiocese of Thyateira and Great Britain.

== Economy ==
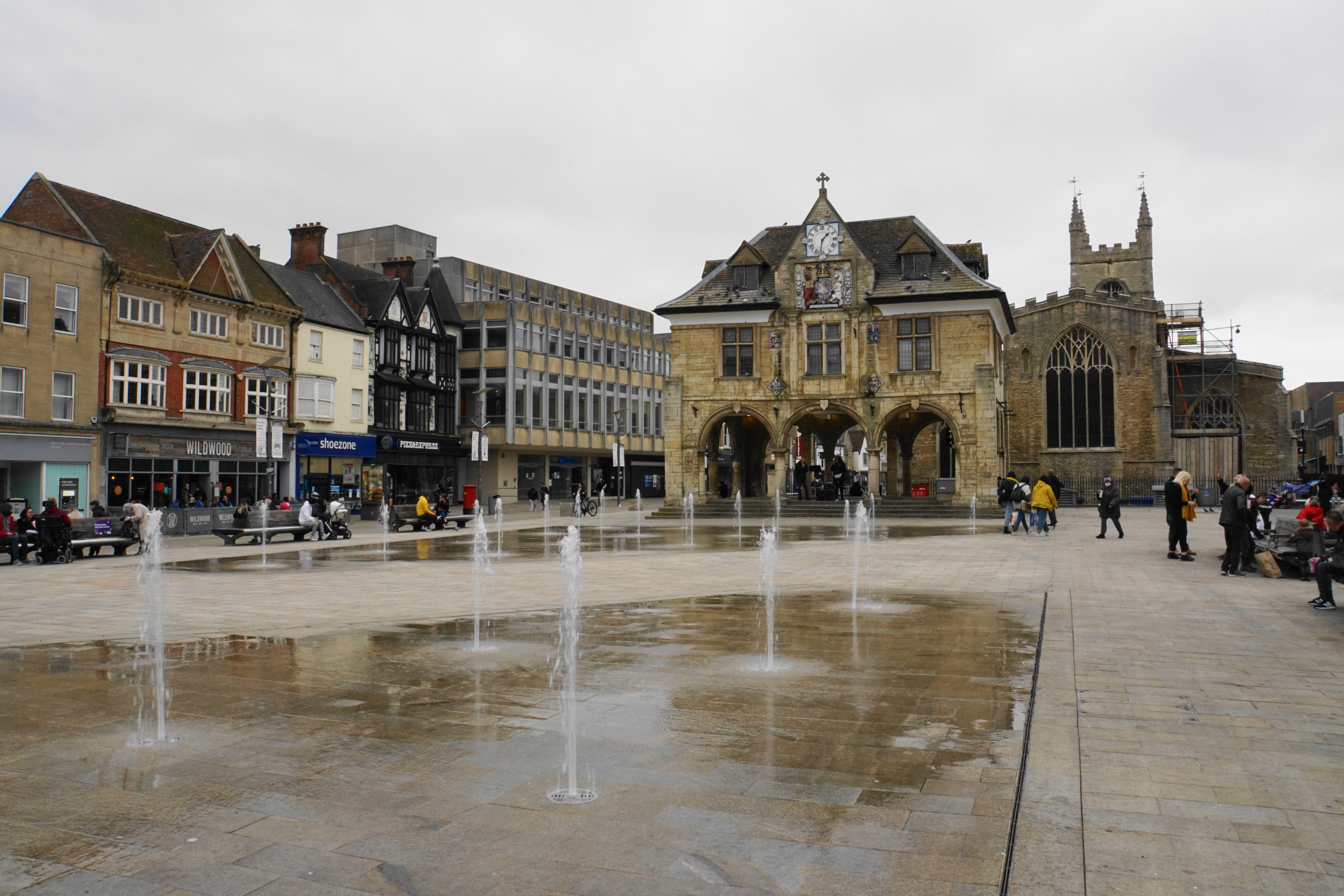
Cathedral Square. The water fountains were removed in 2024.

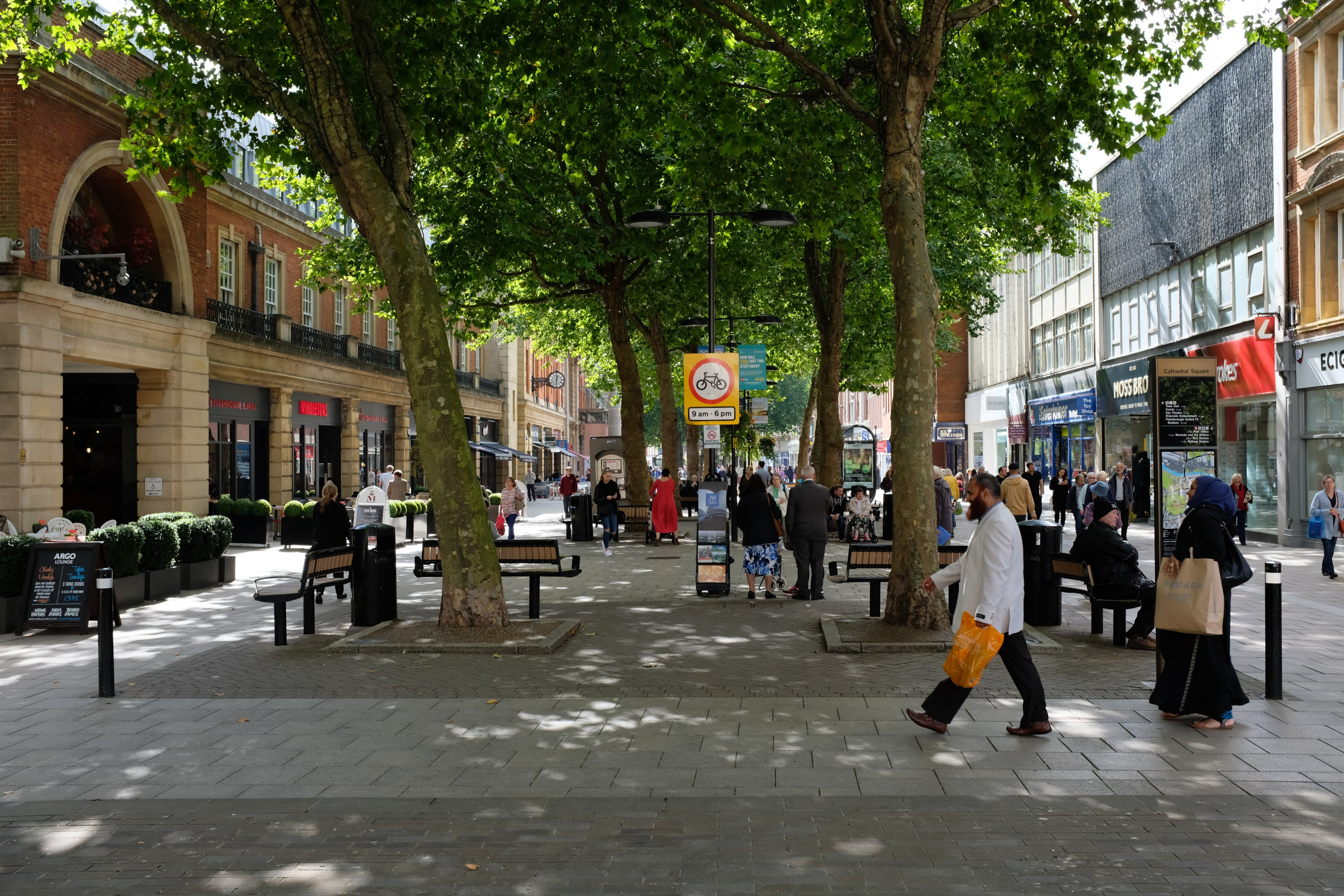
Bridge Street

=== Regeneration ===
Figures plotting growth from 1995 to 2004, revealed that Peterborough had become the most successful economy among unitary authorities in the East of England. They also revealed that the city's economy had grown faster than the regional average and any other economy in the region. It has a strong economy in the environmental goods and services sector and has the largest cluster of environmental businesses in the UK.

In 1994, Peterborough designated itself one of four environment cities in the UK and began working to become the country's acknowledged environment capital. Peterborough Environment City Trust (PECT), an independent charity, was set up at the same time to work towards this goal, delivering projects promoting healthier and sustainable living in the city. Until 2017, PECT organised a yearly 'Green Festival' centered around Cathedral Square, Peterborough, which also benefited local artists and arts organisations through attracting Arts Council funding grants aided by arts facilitator organisation Metal. During the summer of 2018 the last Green Festival was held at Nene Park, in 2019 Peterborough's community environmental projects attracted ministerial attention from the environment secretary Michael Gove. During the COVID-19 pandemic of 2020–21 Peterborough's culture and leisure umbrella charity, Vivacity ceased operating.

The council and regional development agency have taken advice on regeneration issues from a number of internationally recognised experts, including Benjamin Barber (formerly an adviser to President Bill Clinton), Jan Gustav Strandenaes (United Nations adviser on environmental issues) and Patama Roorakwit (a Thai "community architect").

=== Employment ===
According to the 2001 census, the workplace population of 90,656 is divided into 60,118 people who live in Peterborough and 30,358 people who commute in. A further 13,161 residents commute out of the city to work. Earnings in Peterborough are lower than average. Median earnings for full-time workers were £11.93 per hour in 2014, less than the regional median for the East of England of £13.62 and the median hourly rate of £13.15 for Great Britain as a whole. As part of the government's M11 corridor, Peterborough is committed to creating 17,500 jobs with the population growing to 200,000 by 2020.

Future employment will also be created through the plan for the city centre launched by the council in 2003. Predictions of the levels and types of employment created were published in 2005. These include 1,421 jobs created in retail; 1,067 created in a variety of leisure and cultural developments; 338 in three hotels; and a further 4,847 jobs created in offices and other workspaces. Recent relocations of large employers include both Tesco (1,070 employees) and Debenhams (850 employees) distribution centres. A further 2,500 jobs were to be created in the £140 million Gateway warehouse and distribution park. This was expected to compensate for the 6,000 job losses as a result of the decline in manufacturing, anticipated in a report cited by the cabinet member for economic growth and regeneration in 2006.

With traditionally low levels of unemployment, Peterborough is a popular destination for workers and has seen significant growth through migration since the postwar period. The leader of the council said in August 2006 that he believed that 80% of the 65,000 people who had arrived in East Anglia from the states that joined the European Union in 2004 were living in Peterborough. To help cope with this influx, the council put forward plans to construct an average of 1,300 homes each year until 2021. Peterborough Trades Council, formed in 1898, is affiliated to the Trades Union Congress.

== Culture ==
The former public library on Broadway was funded by Scottish philanthropist Andrew Carnegie and opened in 1906; Carnegie was made first freeman of the city on the day of the opening ceremony.

=== Arts ===
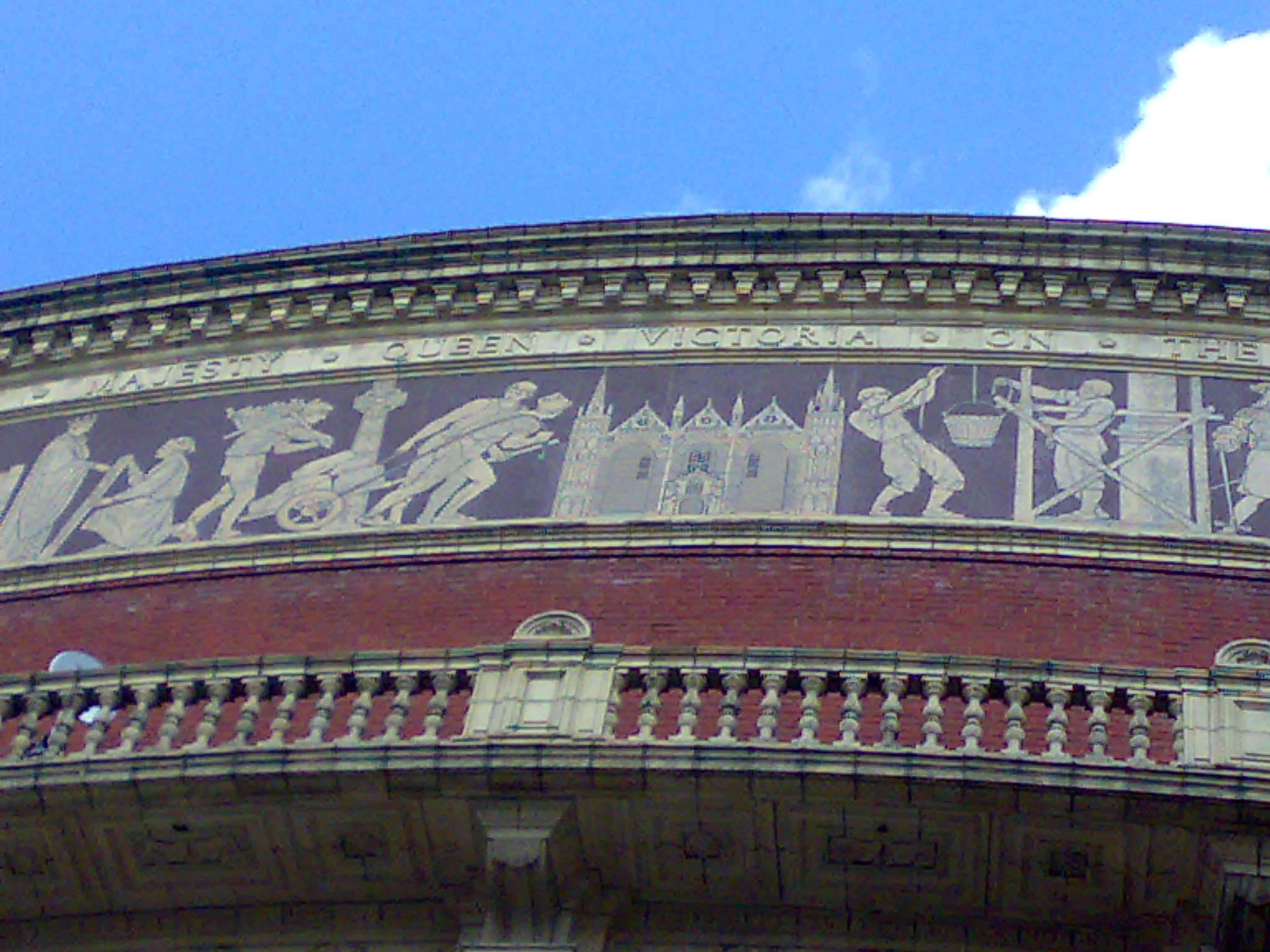
A section of the Triumph of Arts and Sciences at the Royal Albert Hall (1867–1871), depicting Peterborough Cathedral

Peterborough enjoys a wide range of events including the annual East of England Show, Peterborough Festival and CAMRA beer festival, which takes place on the river embankment in late August. The yearly festivals have attracted arts funding and enabled further community projects within the city. Nationally published cartoonist John Elson, from Peterborough, has provided imagery for many of the events.

The city acts as the central hub for the region's visual arts community, with the Peterborough Artists Open Studio organisation (PAOS), celebrating its 21st anniversary year as of 2021. A number of statues by the British sculptor Antony Gormley were re-installed in the city in 2018. Removed for repair works from their original setting on concrete pillars next to the rowing lake in Nene Park, they can now be seen on top of buildings surrounding Cathedral Square in the town centre.

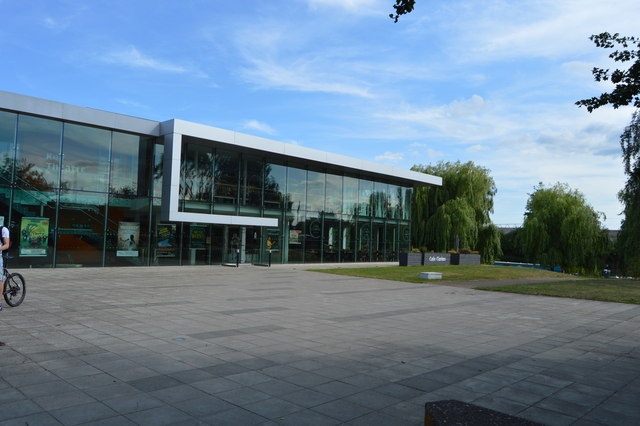
The Key Theatre

The Key Theatre, built in 1973, is situated on the embankment, next to the River Nene. The theatre aims to provide entertainment, enlightenment and education by reflecting the rich culture Peterborough has to offer. The programme is made up of home-grown productions, national touring shows, local community productions and one-off concerts. There is disabled access, an infrared hearing system for the deaf and hard of hearing and there are also regular signed performances.

In 1937, the Odeon Cinema opened on Broadway, where it operated successfully for more than half a century. In 1991, the Odeon showed its last film to the public and was left to fall into a state of disrepair, until 1997, when a local entrepreneur purchased the building as part of a larger project, including a restaurant and art gallery. The Broadway, designed by Tim Foster Architects, was one of the largest theatres in the region and offered a selection of live entertainment, including music, comedy and films. In 2009, it was severely damaged by arsonists, resulting in closure when its insurers refused to pay the claim due to faulty fire detection systems.

The Embassy Theatre, a large Art Deco building designed by David Evelyn Nye, also opened on Broadway in 1937. Nye was usually a cinema architect, and this was his only theatre. The Embassy was converted into a cinema in 1953, becoming the ABC and later the Cannon Cinema, before it was closed in 1989. Since 1996, the premises have been occupied by the Edwards bar chain.

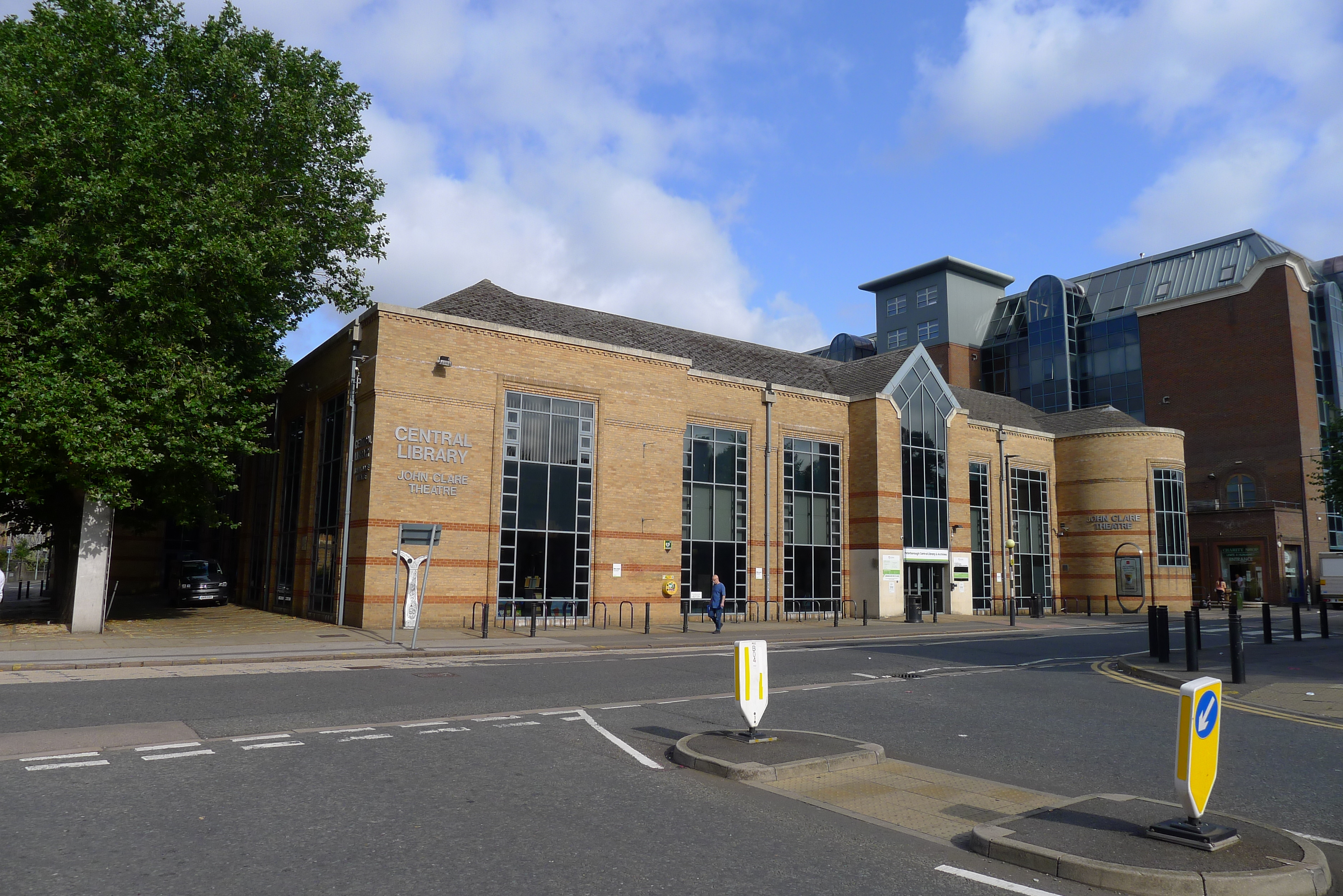
Central Library and John Clare Theatre

The John Clare Theatre within the new central library, again on Broadway, is home to the Peterborough Film Society. One of the region's leading venues, the Cresset in Bretton, provides a wide range of events for the residents of the city and beyond, including theatre, comedy, music and dance. Peterborough has a 13-screen Showcase Cinema, an ice rink and two indoor swimming pools open to the general public.

A diverse range of restaurants can be found throughout the city, including Chinese, Indian, Thai and many Italian restaurants. Peterborough has recently been used as the setting in popular literature: A Short History of Tractors in Ukrainian by Marina Lewycka, A Spot of Bother by Mark Haddon and, the first in a projected series, Long Way Home, a debut novel by Eva Doran.

=== Twinning ===
Town twinning started in Europe after the Second World War. Its purpose was to promote friendship and greater understanding between the people of different European cities. A twinning link is a formal, long-term friendship agreement involving co-operation between two communities in different countries and endorsed by both local authorities. The two communities organise projects and activities addressing a range of issues and develop an understanding of historical, cultural, lifestyle similarities and differences. Peterborough is twinned with the following municipalities:

- Alcalá de Henares, Spain (birthplace of Queen Katherine, 1986)
- Ballarat, Australia (1947)
- Bourges, France (1957)
- Forlì, Italy (1981)
- Viersen, Germany (1981)
- Vinnytsia, Ukraine (1991)

Bourges and Forlì are also twinned with each other. The city also has more informal friendship links with Foggia, Italy; Kwe Kwe, Zimbabwe; Pécs, Hungary; and all Peterboroughs around the world. The county of Cambridgeshire has been twinned with Kreis Viersen, Germany since 1983.

== Landmarks ==
Peterborough Cathedral, formally the Cathedral Church of Saint Peter, Saint Paul and Saint Andrew, whose statues look down from the three high gables of the West Front, was founded as a monastery in AD 655 and re-built in its present form between 1118 and 1238. It has been the seat of the Bishop of Peterborough since the diocese was created in 1541, when the last abbot was made the first bishop and the abbot's house was converted into the episcopal palace. Peterborough Cathedral is one of the most intact large Norman buildings in England and is renowned for its imposing early English Gothic West Front which, with its three enormous arches, is without architectural precedent and with no direct successor. The cathedral has the distinction of having had two queens buried beneath its paving: Catherine of Aragon and Mary, Queen of Scots. The remains of Queen Mary were removed to Westminster Abbey by her son James I when he became King of England.

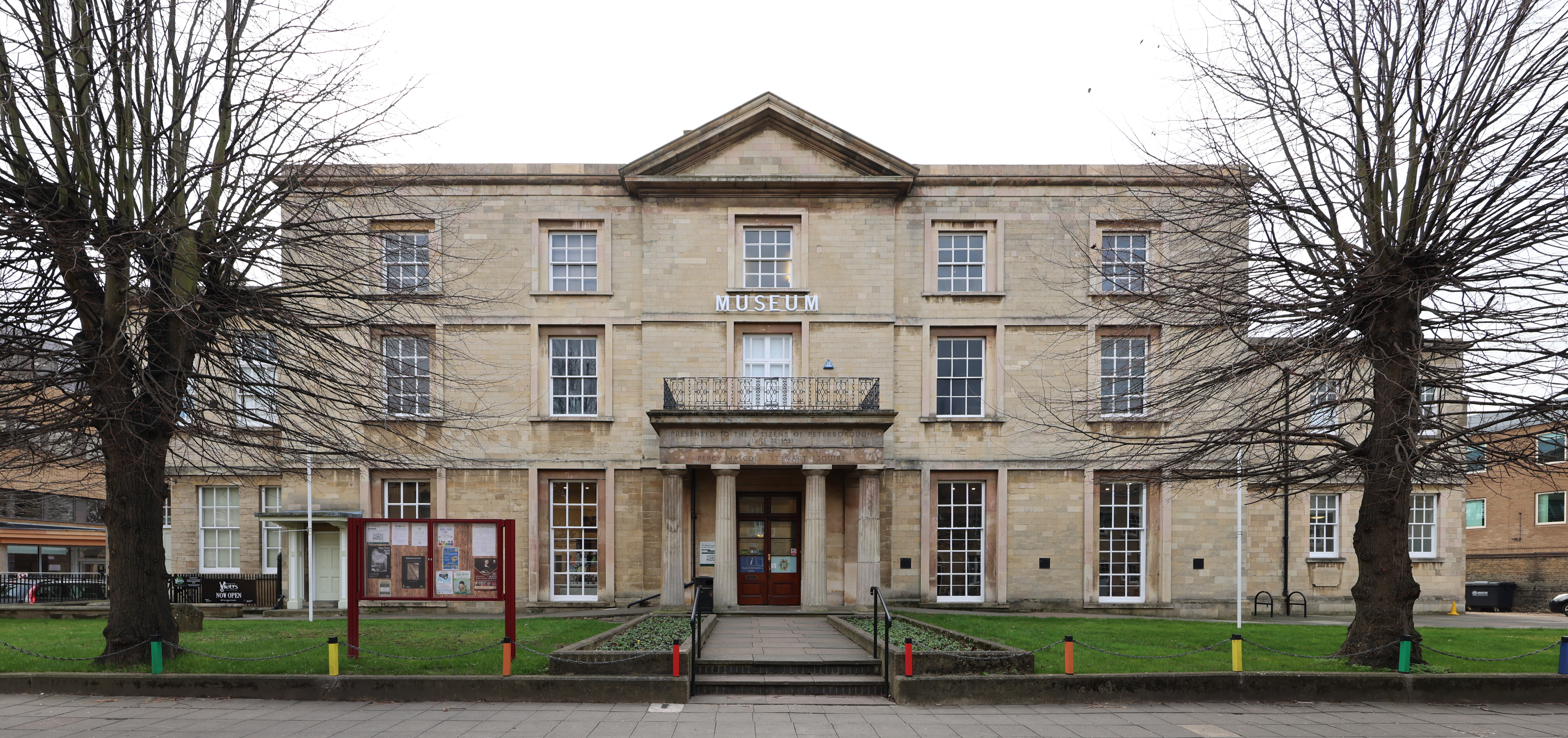
Museum and Art Gallery

The general layout of Peterborough is attributed to Martin de Vecti who, as abbot from 1133 to 1155, rebuilt the settlement on dry limestone to the west of the monastery, rather than the often-flooded marshlands to the east. Abbot Martin was responsible for laying out the market place and the wharf beside the river. Peterborough's 17th-century Guildhall was built in 1671 by John Lovin, who also restored the bishop's palace shortly after the restoration of King Charles II. It stands on columns, providing an open ground floor for the butter and poultry markets which used to be held there. The Market Place was renamed Cathedral Square and the adjacent Gates Memorial Fountain moved to Bishop's Road Gardens in 1963, when the (then weekly) market was transferred to the site of the old cattle market.

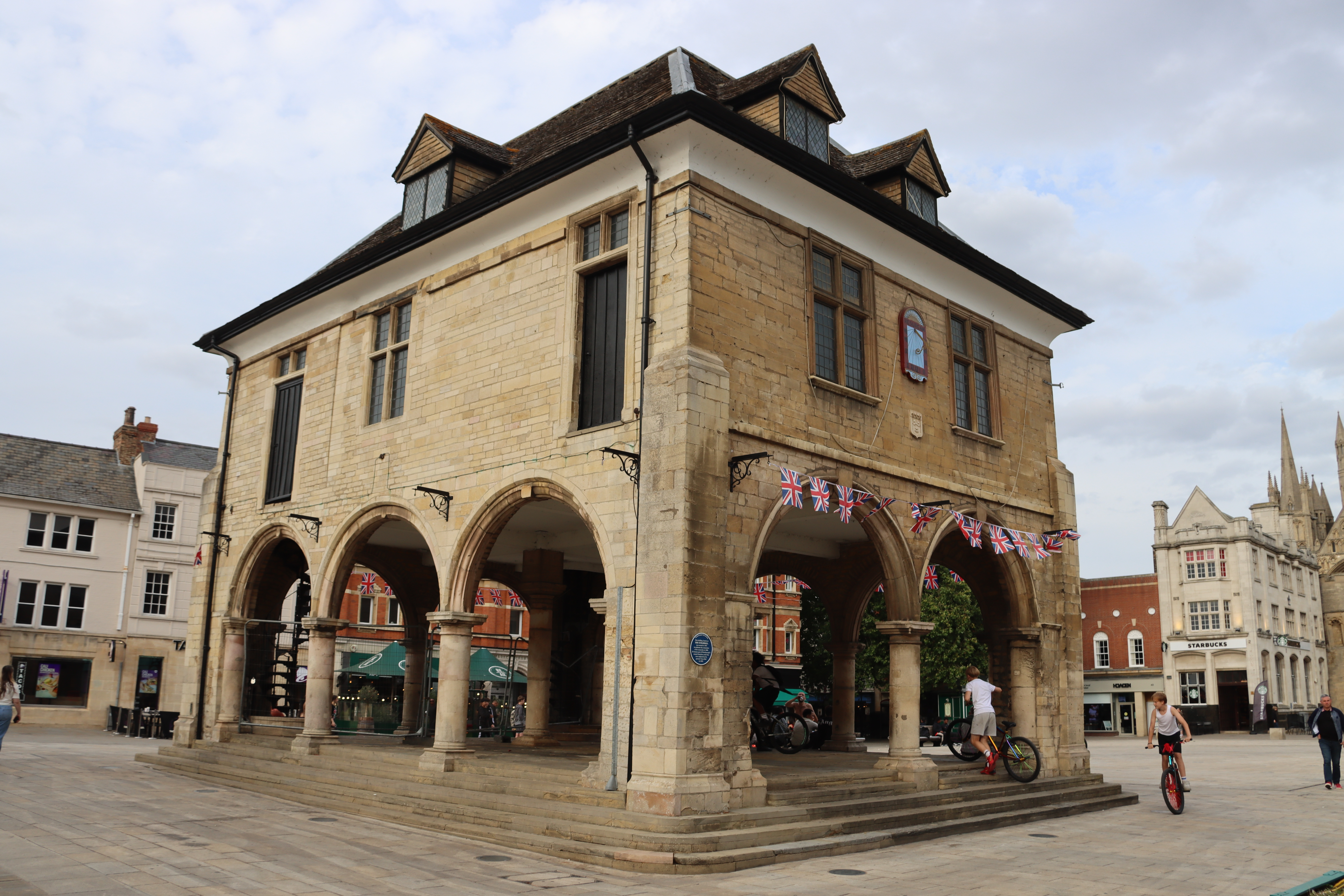
Peterborough Guildhall

Peterscourt on City Road was designed by Sir George Gilbert Scott in 1864, housing St. Peter's Teacher Training College for men until 1938. The building is mainly listed for the 18th century doorway, brought from the London Guildhall following war damage. Nearby Tout Hill, the site of a castle bailey, is a scheduled monument. The city has a large Victorian park containing formal gardens, children's play areas, an aviary, bowling green, tennis courts, pitch and putt course and tea rooms. The Park has been awarded the Green Flag Award, the national standard for parks and green spaces, by the Civic Trust. A Cross of Sacrifice was erected in Broadway cemetery by the Imperial War Graves Commission in the early 1920s. The Lido, a striking building with elements of art deco design, was opened in 1936 and is one of the few survivors of its type still in use.

Peterborough Museum and Art Gallery, built in 1816, housed the city's first infirmary from 1857 to 1928. The museum has a collection of some 227,000 objects, including local archaeology and social history, from the products of the Roman pottery industry to Britain's oldest known murder victim; a collection of marine fossil remains from the Jurassic period of international importance; the manuscripts of John Clare, the "Northamptonshire Peasant Poet" as he was commonly known in his own time; and the Norman Cross collection of items made by French prisoners of war. These prisoners were kept at Norman Cross on the outskirts of Peterborough from 1797 to 1814, in what is believed to be the world's first purpose-built prisoner of war camp. The art collection contains an impressive variety of paintings, prints and drawings dating from the 1600s to the present day. Peterborough Museum also holds regular temporary exhibitions, weekend events and guided tours.

Burghley House to the north of Peterborough, near Stamford, was built and mostly designed by Sir William Cecil, later 1st Baron Burghley, who was Lord High Treasurer to Queen Elizabeth I for most of her reign. The country house, with a park laid out by Lancelot 'Capability' Brown in the 18th century, is one of the principal examples of 16th-century English architecture. The estate, still home to his descendants, hosts the Burghley Horse Trials, an annual three-day event. Another Grade I listed building, Milton Hall near Castor, ancestral home of the Barons and later Earls Fitzwilliam, also dates from the same period. For two centuries following the restoration the city was a pocket borough of this family.

The John Clare Cottage in the village of Helpston was purchased by the John Clare Trust in 2005. The cottage, home of John Clare from his birth in 1793 until 1832, has been restored using traditional building methods to create a resource where visitors can learn about the poet, his works and how rural people lived in the early 19th century. The John Clare Cottage and Thorney Heritage Museum form part of the Greater Fens Museum Partnership, along with Peterborough Museum and Flag Fen.

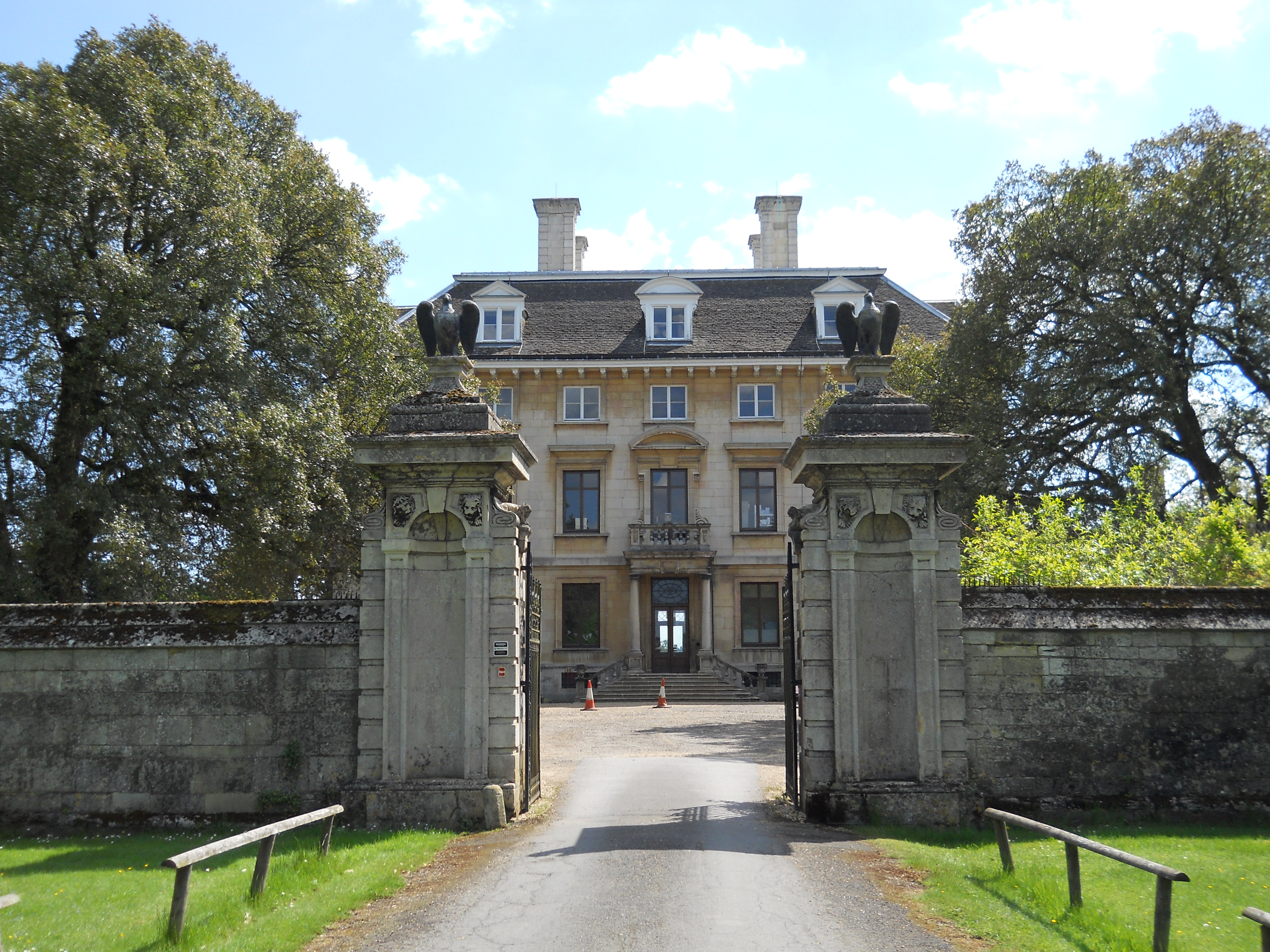
Thorpe Hall

Longthorpe Tower, a 14th-century three-storey tower and fortified manor house in the care of English Heritage, is situated about 2 mi (3.2 km) west of the city centre. It is a scheduled monument, and contains the finest and most complete set of domestic paintings of their period in northern Europe. Nearby Thorpe Hall is one of the few mansions built in the Commonwealth period. A maternity hospital from 1943 to 1970, it was acquired by the Sue Ryder Foundation in 1986 and is currently in use as a hospice.

Flag Fen, the Bronze Age archaeological site, was discovered in 1982, when a team led by Dr Francis Pryor carried out a survey of dykes in the area. Probably religious, it comprises a large number of poles arranged in five long rows, connecting Whittlesey with Peterborough across the wet fenland. The museum exhibits many of the artefacts found, including what is believed to be the oldest wheel in Britain. An exposed section of the Roman road known as the Fen Causeway also crosses the site.

The Nene Valley Railway, which is now a 7.5-mile (12.1 km) heritage railway, was one of the last passenger lines to fall under the Beeching Axe in 1966, although it remained open for freight traffic until 1972. In 1974, the former development corporation bought the line, which runs from the city centre to Yarwell Junction just west of Wansford via Orton Mere and the 500 acres (200 hectares) Ferry Meadows country park, and leased it to the Peterborough Railway Society. Railworld is a railway museum located beside Peterborough Nene Valley railway station.

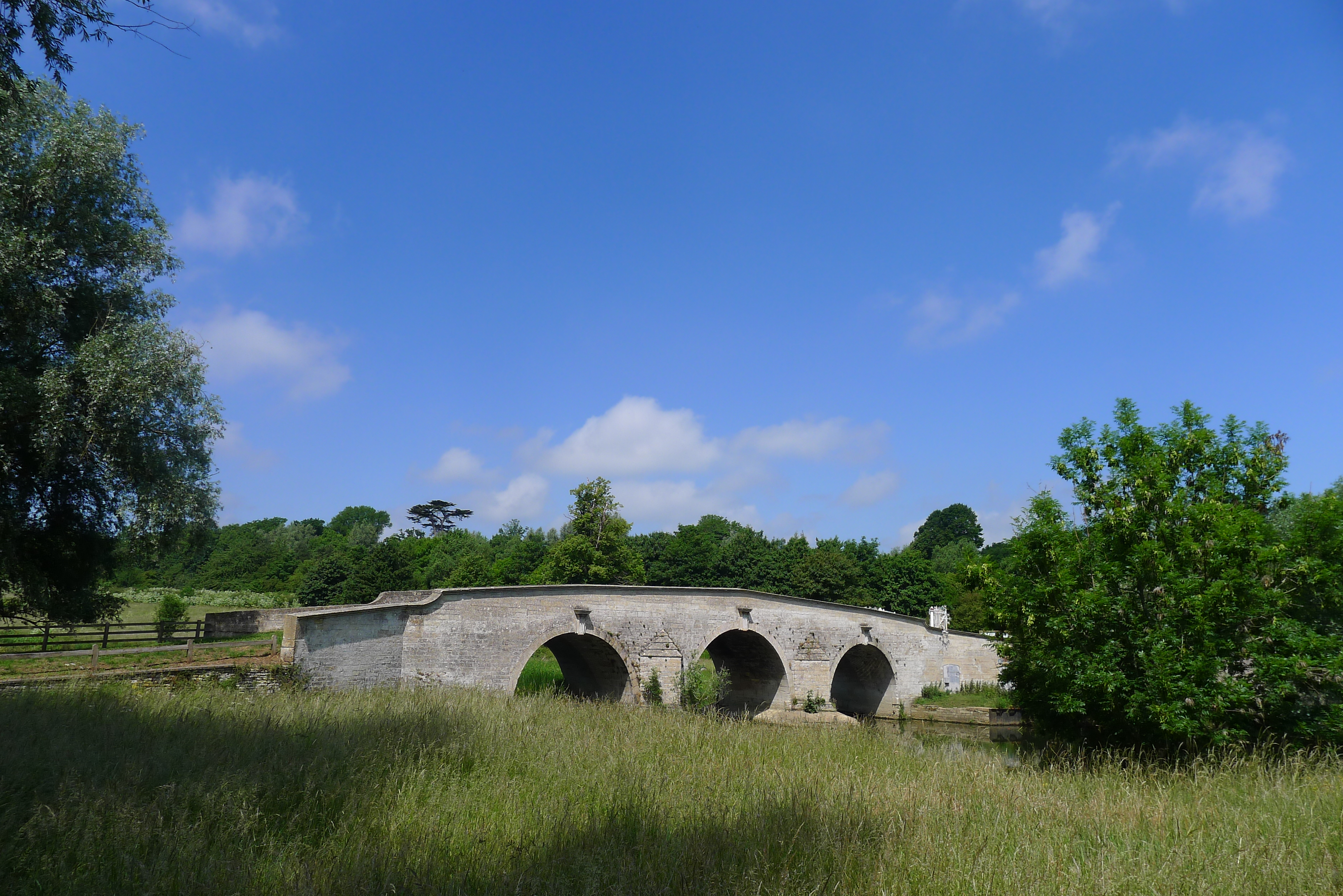
Ferry Bridge at Nene Park

The Nene Park, which opened in 1978, covers a site 3.5 mi (5.6 km) long, from slightly west of Castor to the centre of Peterborough. The park has three lakes, one of which houses a watersports centre. Ferry Meadows, one of the major destinations and attractions signposted on the Green Wheel, occupies a large portion of Nene Park. Orton Mere provides access to the east of the park.

Southey Wood, once included in the Royal Forest of Rockingham, is a mixed woodland maintained by the Forestry Commission between the villages of Upton and Ufford. Nearby, Castor Hanglands, Barnack Hills and Holes and Bedford Purlieus national nature reserves are each sites of special scientific interest. In 2002, the Hills and Holes, one of Natural England's 35 spotlight reserves, was designated a special area of conservation as part of the Natura 2000 network of sites throughout the European Union.

== Transport ==
=== Rail ===
Peterborough railway station is a principal stop on the East Coast Main Line, 45–50 minutes' journey time from central London, with high-speed intercity services from King's Cross to Edinburgh Waverley operated by the London North Eastern Railway at around a 20-minute frequency. It is the northern terminus of slower commuter services from Horsham, via Gatwick Airport and central London, operated by Greater Thameslink Railway.

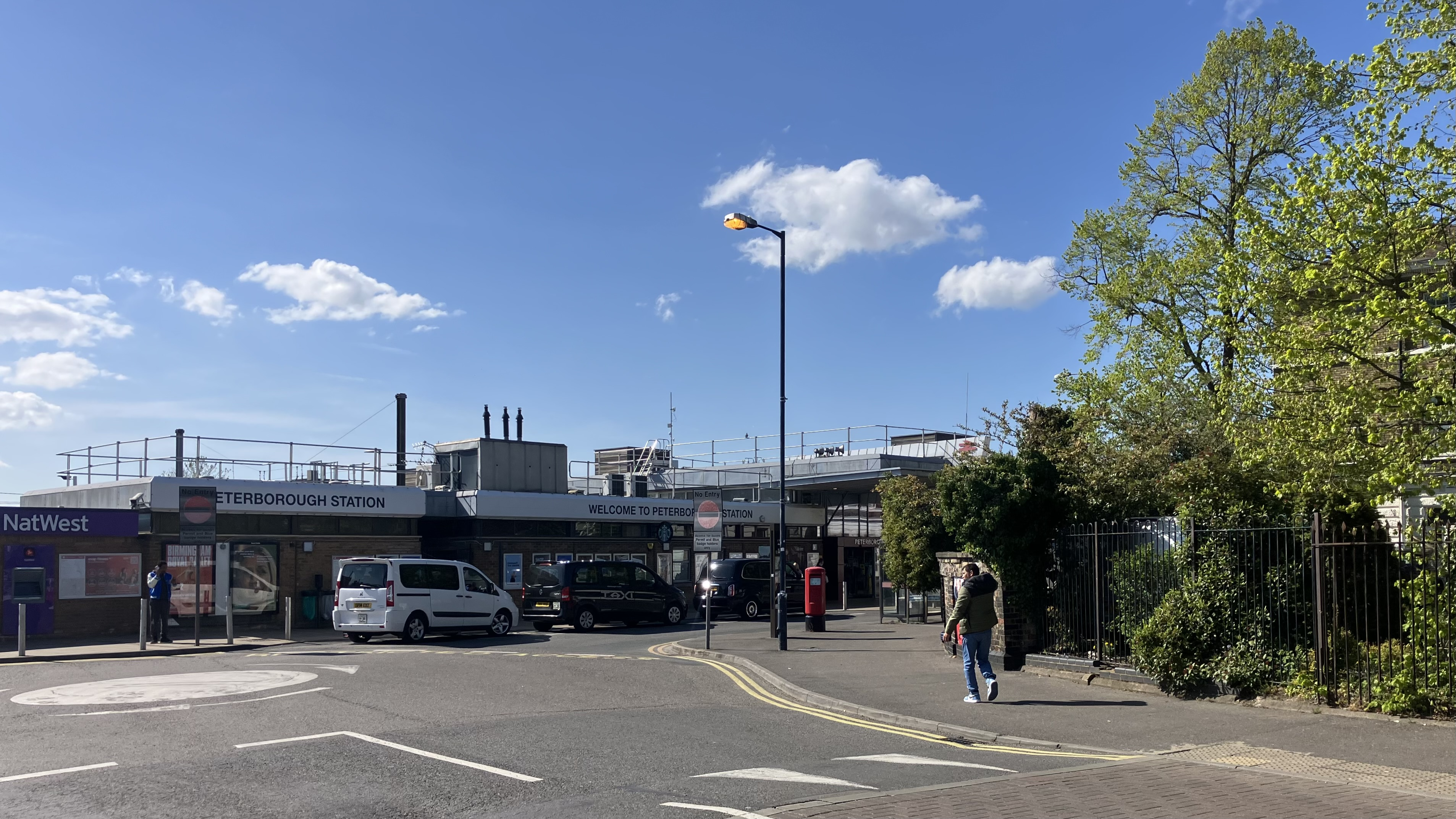
The railway station

It is a major railway junction where a number of cross-country routes converge:

- East Midlands Railway operates through services between Norwich, Nottingham and Liverpool Lime Street that call at Peterborough, as well as trains on the line to Lincoln.
- CrossCountry provides connections west to Leicester and Birmingham, and east to Ely, Cambridge and Stansted Airport.
- Greater Anglia also runs trains to and from Ipswich via Soham.

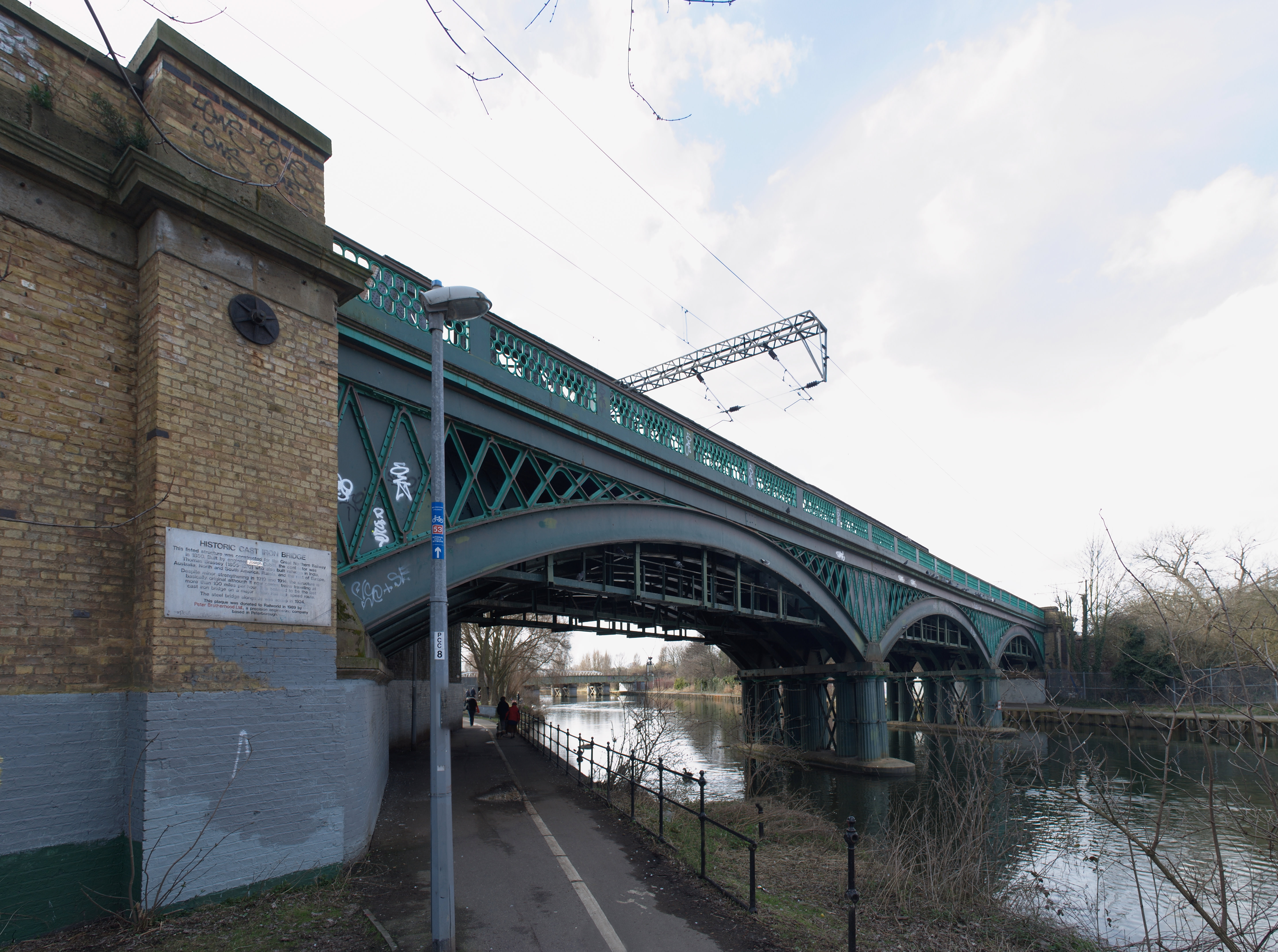
Historic cast iron railway bridge over the River Nene (1847), built by Sir William and Joseph Cubitt

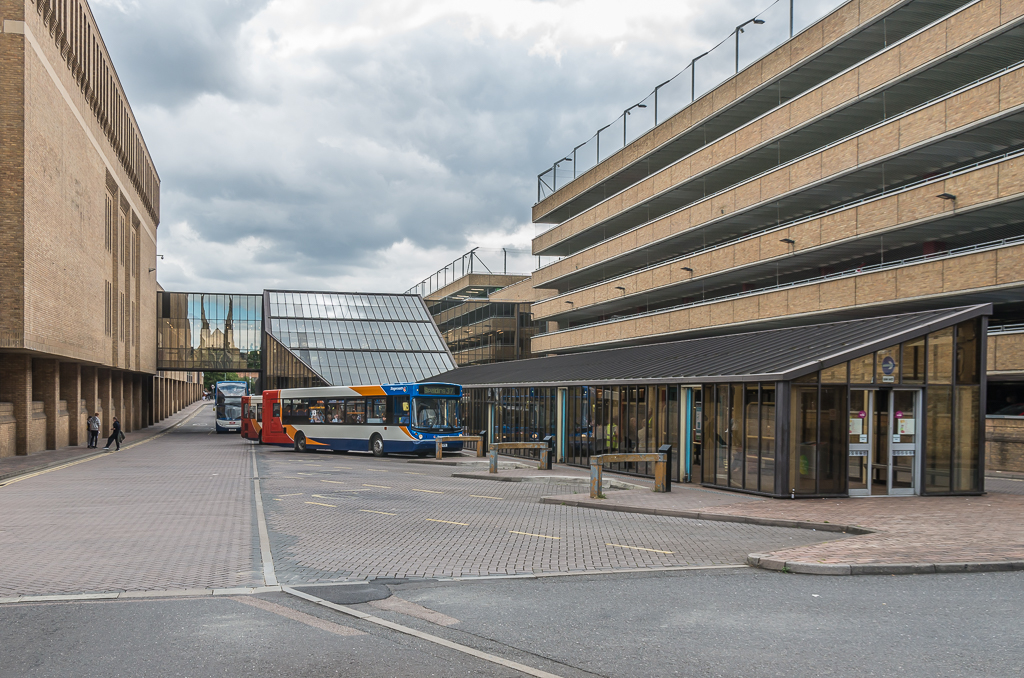
Queensgate Bus Station

=== Water ===
The River Nene, made navigable from the port at Wisbech to Northampton by 1761, passes through the city centre. The Nene Viaduct carries the railway over the river. It was built in 1847 by Sir William and Joseph Cubitt. William Cubitt was the chief engineer of Crystal Palace erected at Hyde Park in 1851. Apart from some minor repairs in 1910 and 1914 (the steel bands and cross braces around the fluted legs) the bridge remains as the Cubitts built it. Now a Grade II* listed structure, it is the oldest surviving cast-iron railway bridge in the UK. By the Town Bridge, the Customs House, built in the early eighteenth century, is a visible reminder of the city's past function as an inland port. The Environment Agency navigation starts at the junction with the Northampton arm of the Grand Union Canal and extends for 91 miles (146 km), ending at Bevis Hall, just upstream of Wisbech. The tidal limit was Woodston Wharf until the Dog-in-a-Doublet lock was built five miles (8.0 km) downstream in 1937.

=== Road ===
The A1/A1(M) primary route (part of European route E15) broadly follows the path of the historic Great North Road from St Paul's Cathedral in the heart of London, passing Peterborough (Junction 17), and continuing north a further 335 miles (539 km) to central Edinburgh. In 1899 the British Electric Traction Company sought permission for a tramway joining the northern suburbs with the city centre. The system, which operated under the name Peterborough Electric Traction Company, opened in 1903 and was abandoned in favour of motor buses in 1930, when it was merged into the Eastern Counties Omnibus Company. Today, bus services in the city are operated by several companies including Stagecoach (formerly Cambus and Viscount) and Delaine Buses. Despite its large-scale growth, Peterborough has the fastest peak and off-peak travel times for a city of its size in the UK, due to the construction of the parkways. The Local Transport Plan anticipated expenditure totalling around £180 million for the period up to 2010 on major road schemes to accommodate development.

The combination of rail connections to the Port of Felixstowe and to the East Coast Main Line as well as a road connection via the A1(M) has led to Peterborough being proposed as the site of a 334 acres (1.35 km^{2}) rail-road logistics and distribution centre to be known as Magna Park.

=== Green Wheel and City Cycling ===
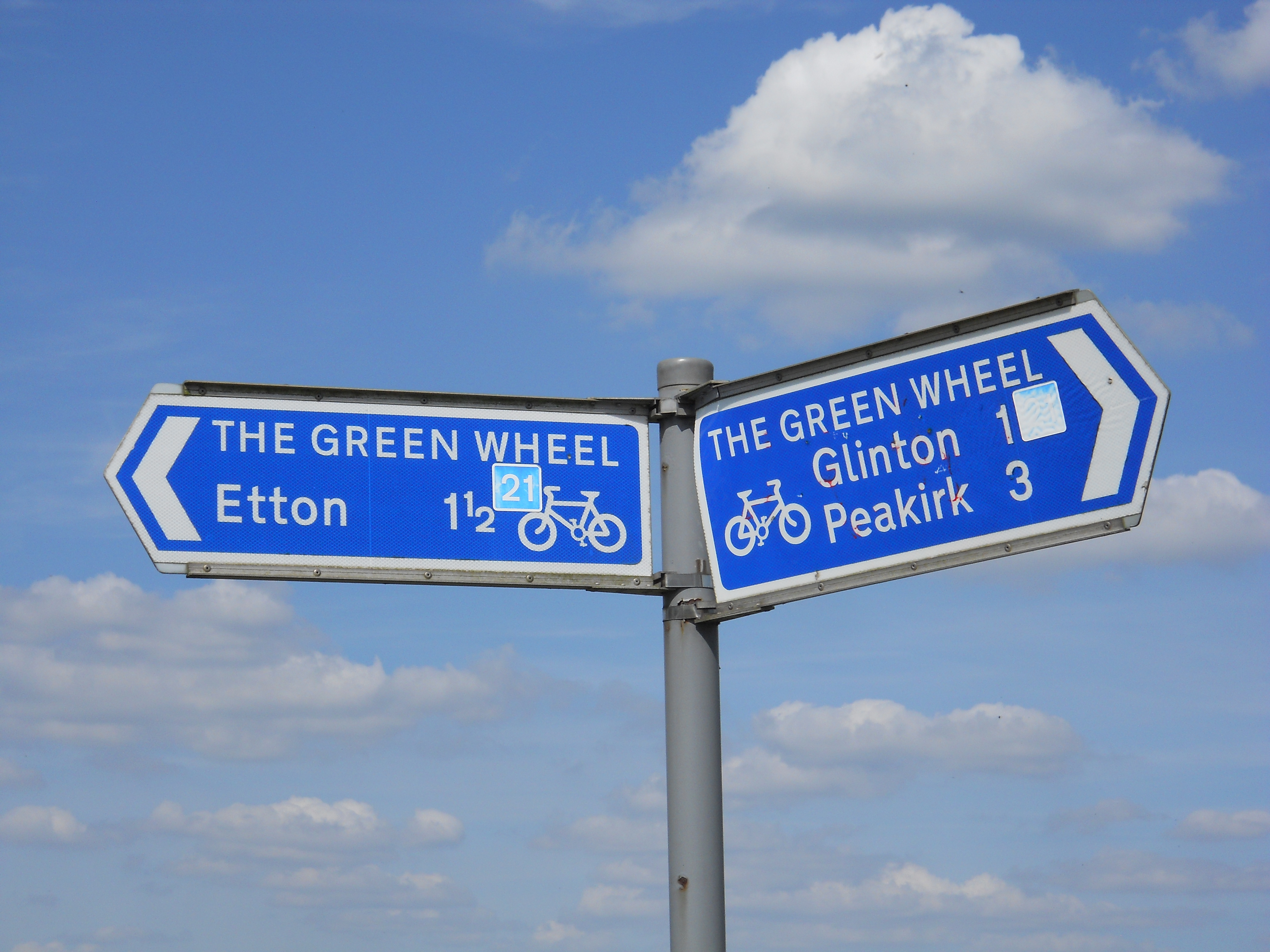
Green Wheel signpost

The Peterborough Millennium Green Wheel is a 50-mile (80 km) network of cycleways, footpaths and bridleways which provide safe, continuous routes around the city with radiating spokes connecting to the city centre. The project has also created a sculpture trail, which provides functional, landscape artworks along the Green Wheel route and a Living Landmarks project involving the local community in the creation of local landscape features such as mini woodlands, ponds and hedgerows. Another long-distance footpath, the Hereward Way, runs from Oakham in Rutland, through Peterborough, to East Harling in Norfolk. While cycling within the city received a boost during the COVID-19 pandemic with the introduction of new cycle lanes in busy streets, plans to connect the villages to the west of Peterborough with a new cycle track have been refused permission and some cycle lane decisions have been reversed in the city centre during easing of the corona virus lockdowns.

== Education ==
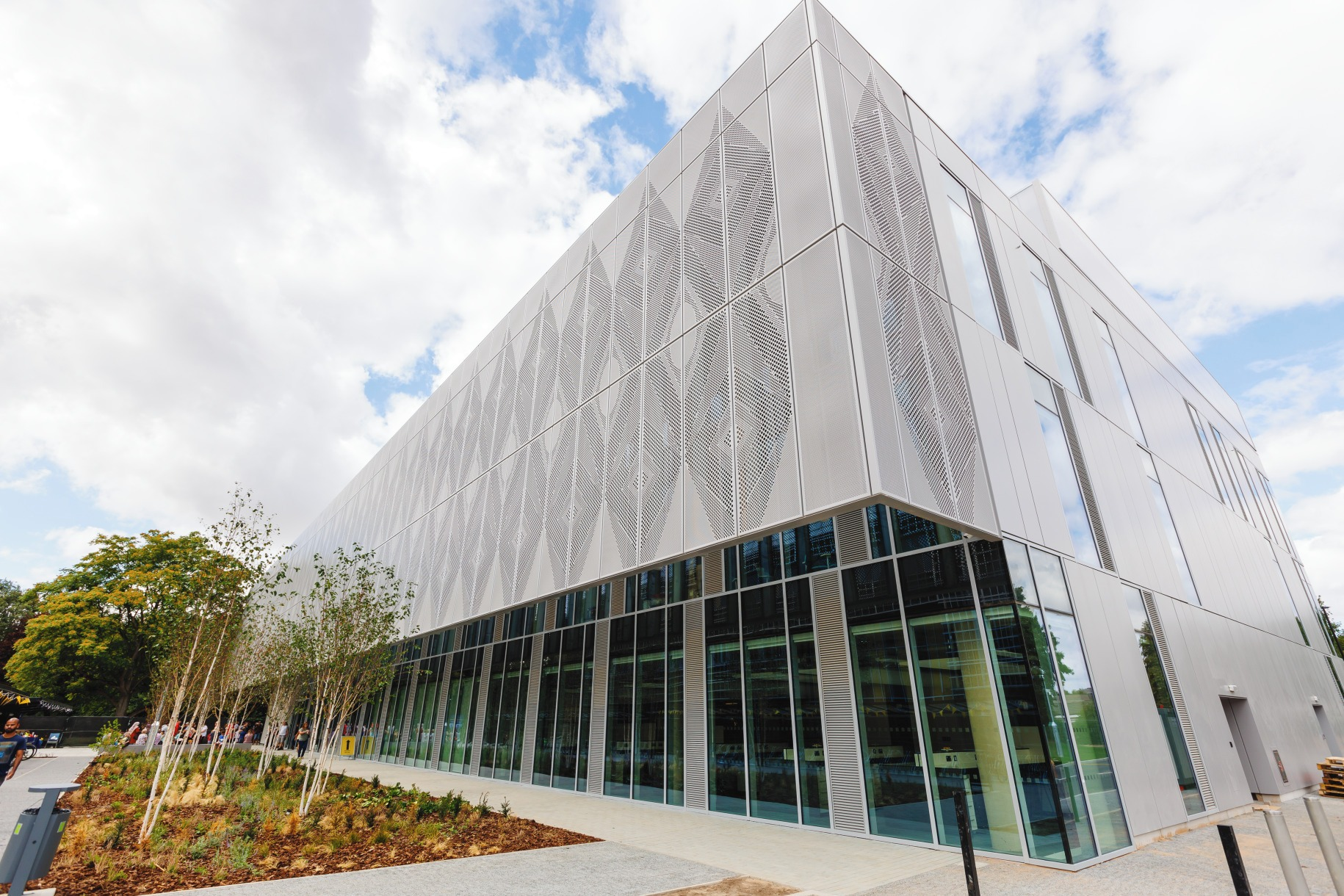
University House, Anglia Ruskin University Peterborough.

Peterborough has one independent school: The Peterborough School at Westwood House, founded in 1895. The school caters for girls and now boys up to the age of 18. Peterborough's state schools have recently undergone significant change. Five of the city's fifteen secondary schools were closed in July 2007, to be demolished over the coming years. John Mansfield (now an adult learning centre), Hereward (formerly Eastholm, now City of Peterborough Academy, sponsored by the Greenwood Dale Foundation Trust) and Deacon's were replaced with the flagship Thomas Deacon Academy, designed by Lord Foster of Thames Bank which opened in September 2007.

Queen Katharine Academy (previously The Voyager School), which has specialist media arts status, replaced Bretton Woods and Walton Community School. It is part of the Thomas Deacon Education Trust. The schools that remain have been extended and enlarged. Over £200 million was spent and the changes on-going to 2010. The King's School is one of seven schools established, or in some cases re-endowed and renamed, by King Henry VIII during the dissolution of the monasteries to pray for his soul. In 2006, 39.4% of Peterborough local education authority pupils attained five grades A* to C, including English and Mathematics, in the General Certificate of Secondary Education, lower than the national average of 45.8%.

The city has two colleges of further and higher education, Peterborough College (established in 1946 as Peterborough Technical College) and City College Peterborough (known as Peterborough College of Adult Education until 2010). By 2004, Peterborough College attracted over 15,000 students each year from the UK and abroad and was ranked in the top five per cent of colleges in the UK. Greater Peterborough University Technical College is a new education facility set to open in September 2015.

In 2020, planning permission was granted for a new university campus, ARU Peterborough, which subsequently opened its doors in September 2022 on Bishops Road, a five-minute walk from the City Centre. It is operated by Anglia Ruskin University with four faculties: Business, Innovation and Entrepreneurship; Creative and Digital Arts and Sciences; Agriculture, Environment and Sustainability; Health and Education. The new campus took its first cohort of students in 2022, expecting to recruit up to 12,500 by 2028. ARU Peterborough is not expected to receive independent degree awarding powers before 2030, when a review is to take place to determine its future as part of Anglia Ruskin University or whether it should become an independent entity.

== Public Services ==
Healthcare is provided by Peterborough City Hospital, part of the North West Anglia NHS Foundation Trust.

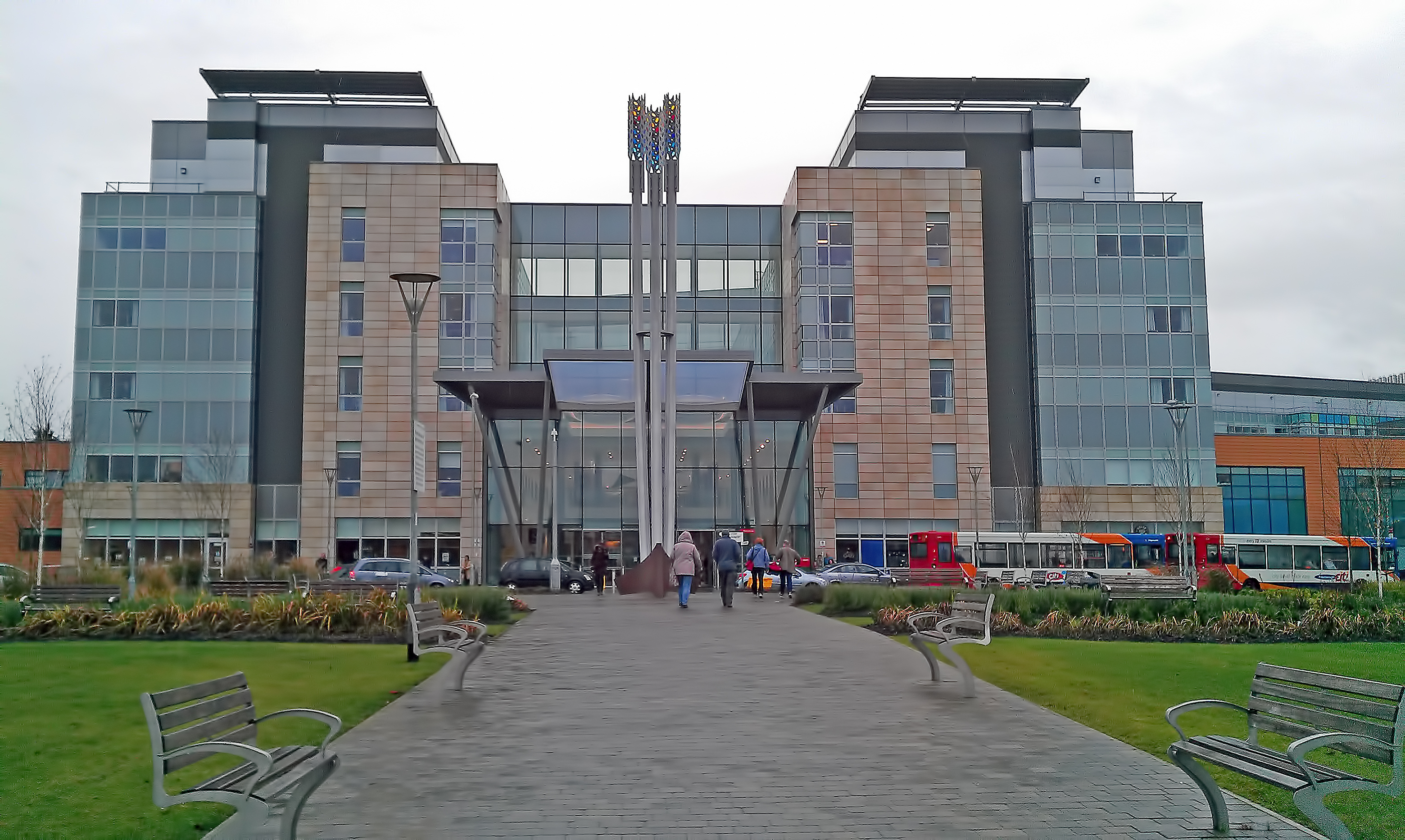
Peterborough City Hospital

== Sport ==
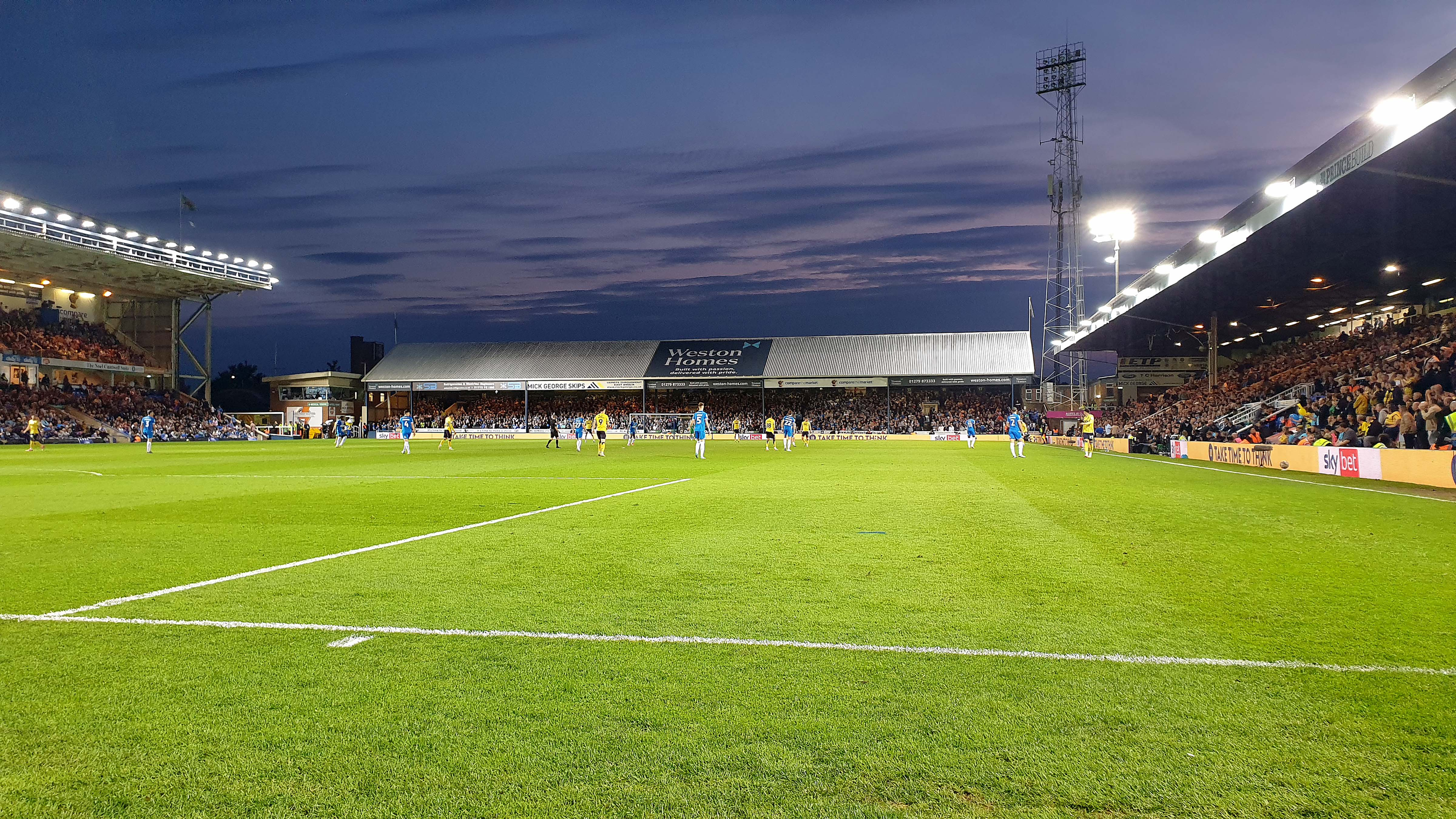
London Road Stadium

Peterborough United Football Club, known as "The Posh", has been the local football team since 1934. They play their home matches at London Road on the south bank of the River Nene. Peterborough United have a history of cup giant-killings. They set the record for the highest number of league goals (134, Terry Bly alone scoring 52) in the 1960–61 season, when they won the Fourth Division title in their first season in the Football League. The club's highest finish position to date was 10th place in Division One, then the second tier of English football, in the 1992–93 season. Irish property developer Darragh MacAnthony was appointed chairman in 2006 and is now owner, having undertaken a lengthy purchase from Barry Fry who remains director of football, having also been manager of the club from 1996 to 2005. Peterborough also has a non-league club, Peterborough Sports, who play in the National League North.

As well as football, Peterborough has teams competing in rugby, cricket, hockey, ice hockey, rowing, athletics, American and Australian rules football. Although Cambridgeshire is not a first-class cricket county, Northamptonshire staged some home matches in the city between 1906 and 1974. Peterborough Town Cricket Club and the City of Peterborough Hockey Club compete at their shared ground in Westwood.

After reforming in 2005, rugby union club Peterborough Lions RFC now compete in National League 3 Midlands. Meanwhile, the city's oldest rugby team, Peterborough RUFC, play at Second Drove (otherwise known as "Fortress Fengate"), and have struggled in recent seasons. Relegation in 2013–14 season, from Midlands 1 East, has been followed by a season in the lower-mid table of the Midlands 2 East (South).

Peterborough City Rowing Club moved from its riverside setting to the current Thorpe Meadows location in 1983. The spring and summer regattas held there attract rowers and scullers from competing clubs all over the country. Every February the adjacent River Nene is host to the head of the river race, which again attracts hundreds of entries. Peterborough Athletic Club train and compete at the embankment athletics arena. In 2006, after 10 years, the Great Eastern Run returned to the racing calendar. Around 3,000 runners raced through the flat streets of Peterborough for the half-marathon, supported by thousands of spectators along the course.

Peterborough Phantoms are the city's ice hockey team, playing in the NIHL at Planet Ice Peterborough, located on Mallard Way in Bretton. Motorcycle speedway is also a popular sport in Peterborough, with race meetings held at the East of England Showground. The team, known as the Peterborough Panthers, have operated regularly in the Elite League. The Showground hosts the annual British Motorcycle Federation Rally each May. In 2009, Peterborough hosted one of the first rounds of the Tour Series, a new series of televised town and city centre cycling races. As of 2015, the city has hosted a round of the Tour Series each year since, with the exception of 2013.

In March 2017 the first bandy session in England for over a century was held in Peterborough, in the form of rink bandy. In 2018 Peterborough Bandy Club was founded. At the 2022 Women's Bandy World Championship Great Britain made its debut in the tournament, represented by a Peterborough team.

== Media ==
There is a major radio transmitter at Morborne, approximately eight miles (13 km) west of Peterborough, for national FM radio (BBC Radios 1–4 and Classic FM) and BBC Radio Cambridgeshire which is the BBC Local Radio station that covers the city. This facility includes a 154-metre (505-foot) high guyed radio mast which collapsed in 2004 after a fire and has since been re-built. Another transmission site at Gunthorpe in the north east of the city transmits AM/MW and local FM radio. The site is only 3 metres (9.8 feet) above sea level and has an 83-metre (272-foot) high active insulated guyed mast situated on it.

Peterborough is covered by six local radio stations and one regional station, though only two community stations broadcast from the city. These are Salaam FM, catering for the local Muslim population, which started broadcasting in 2016 and Peterborough Community Radio (PCR FM), a station formed as a result of a merger between former internet stations Peterborough FM and Radio Peterborough, which started broadcasting in 2017.

Heart Cambridgeshire (now Heart East), the original independent local radio station launched as Hereward Radio in 1980 and becoming Heart Peterborough in 2009, still holds a large section of the market, but relocated to Cambridge in 2012, where it began sharing the localised programming (of mainly national output) with Heart Cambridge. Hereward's sister station, WGMS, was launched on the old 1332 kHz frequency in 1992; known as Classic Gold from 1994 to 2007, it is now part of Heart's sister Gold Radio network, but has no programming made in Peterborough. Connect Radio (from 1999 to 2010, known as Lite FM), was the city's second commercial station, but was sold and rebranded as Smooth East Midlands on 1 October 2019.

Local TV coverage is provided by BBC Look East and ITV News Anglia.

The Peterborough Telegraph (established 1948) is the city's newspaper. The Telegraph is owned by National World Publishing Ltd. Its website, Peterborough Today, is updated six days a week. The PT's sister paper, the Peterborough Citizen (1898), was a weekly paper delivered free to many homes in the city. The Peterborough Herald and Post (1989, a replacement for the Peterborough Standard, established 1872) ceased publication in 2008. The publisher Emap, which specialises in the production of magazines and the organisation of business events and conferences, traces its origins back to Peterborough in 1854. The 33rd Mayor of Peterborough, Sir Richard Winfrey JP, founder of what would become the East Midland Allied Press, was perhaps the last person to read the Riot Act in 1914.

Peterborough has been used as a location for various television programmes and films. The 1982 BBC production of The Barchester Chronicles was filmed largely in and around Peterborough. In 1983 opening scenes for the 13th James Bond film, Octopussy, starring Sir Roger Moore, were filmed at Orton Mere. A music video for the song "BreakThru" by the band Queen was also shot on the preserved Nene Valley Railway in 1989. In 1995 Pierce Brosnan filmed train crash sequences for the 17th Bond film, GoldenEye, at the former sugar beet factory. A scene for the film The Da Vinci Code was filmed at Burghley House during five weeks' secret filming in 2006; and actor, Lee Marvin, found himself camping in Ferry Meadows during the filming of The Dirty Dozen: Next Mission in 1985. In October 2008 Hollywood returned to Wansford for the filming of the musical Nine, starring Penélope Cruz and Daniel Day-Lewis.

== Notable people ==
=== Before 1950 ===
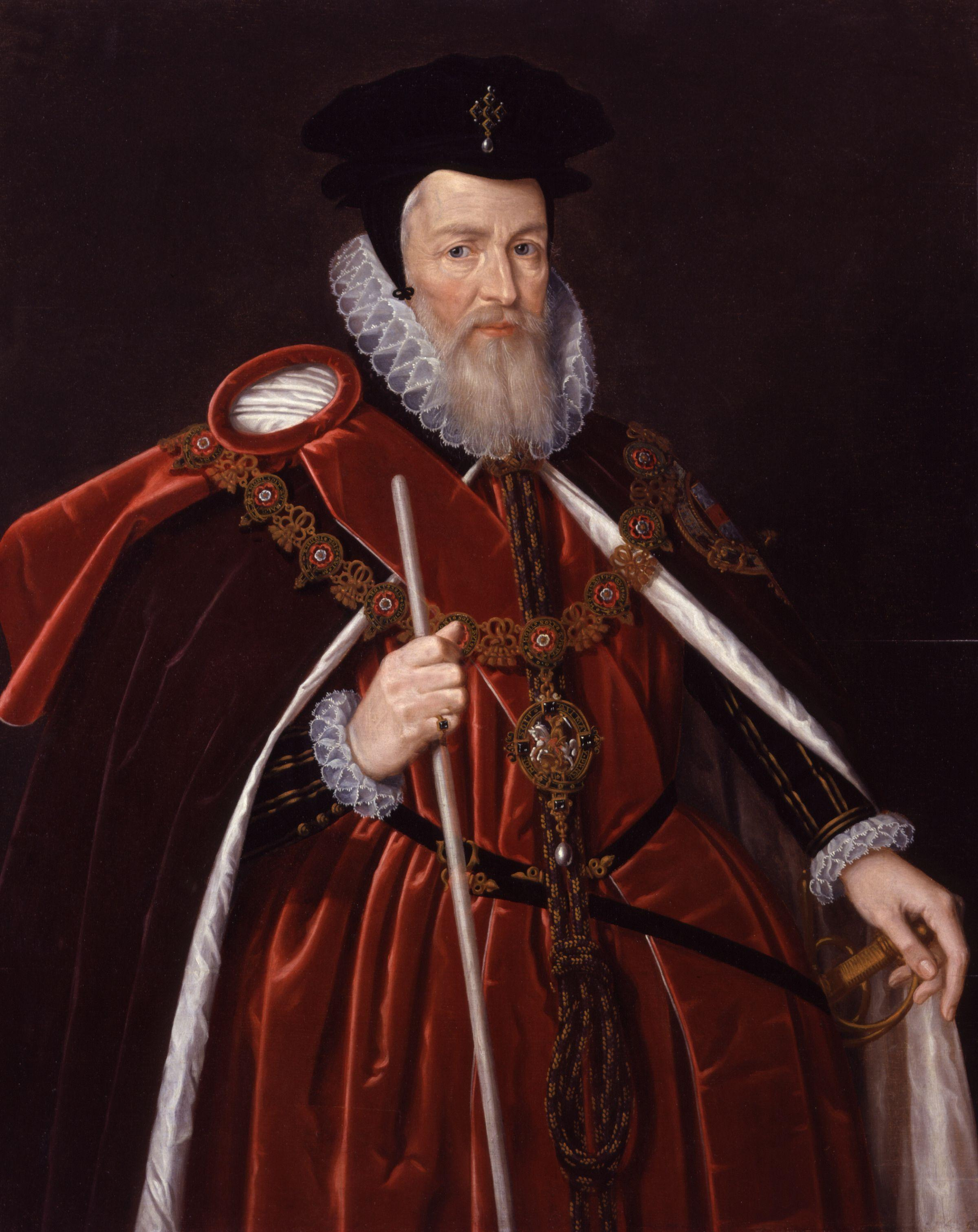
William Cecil, 1st Baron Burghley (1520–1598), in Garter robes

The utilitarian philosopher, Dr Richard Cumberland, was 14th Lord Bishop of Peterborough from 1691 until his death in 1718; and Norfolk-born nurse and humanitarian, Edith Cavell, who received part of her education at Laurel Court in the Minster Precinct, is commemorated by a plaque in the cathedral and by the name of the hospital. A gravedigger called Old Scarlett, whose portrait can be seen above the west door of Peterborough Cathedral, is considered a folk hero. He died in 1594 at the age of 98, having spent much of his life as the sexton at Peterborough Cathedral; having buried two monarchs, he has also been suggested as the inspiration for the gravedigger in Shakespeare's Hamlet. Two prominent historical figures were born locally, Hereward the Wake, an outlaw who led resistance to the Norman Conquest and now lends his name to several places and businesses in the city; and St. John Payne, one of the group of prominent Catholics martyred between 1535 and 1679 and later designated the Forty Martyrs of England and Wales, who was beatified by Pope Leo XIII in 1886 and canonised with the other 39 by Pope Paul VI in 1970.

Peterborough is the birthplace of many notable people, the astronomer George Alcock, one of the most successful visual discoverers of novas and comets; John Clare, from Helpston, the nineteenth century poet; artist, Christopher Perkins – brother of Frank; and Sir Henry Royce, 1st Baronet of Seaton, engineer and co-founder of Rolls-Royce. Physician, actor and author, "Sir" John Hill, credited with 76 separate works in the Dictionary of National Biography, the most valuable of which dealing with botany, is also said to have been born here. The socialist writer and illustrator, Frank Horrabin, who was born in the city, and was elected as the Labour Member of Parliament in 1929.

=== After 1950 ===
Musicians include Sir Thomas Armstrong, organist, conductor and former principal of the Royal Academy of Music; Andy Bell, lead vocalist of the electronic pop duo Erasure; Barrie Forgie, leader of the BBC Big Band; Don Lusher, trombonist and former professor of the Royal College of Music and the Royal Marines School of Music; Paul Nicholas, actor and singer; Maxim and Gizz Butt of The Prodigy and Aston Merrygold of Brit Award-winning pop group JLS. Comedian Ernie Wise lived on Thorpe Avenue for many years, next door to Canadian baritone and actor Edmund Hockridge. Jimmy Savile also lived in the city in the early 1990s.

Other media personalities include actors Simon Bamford, known for the 'Hellraiser' franchise, Adrian Lyne, director of Fatal Attraction, Oscar Jacques, known for playing Tom Tupper in the CBBC Series M.I. High, Luke Pasqualino, known for his roles in Skins and The Musketeers; television presenter, Sarah Cawood, who grew up in Maxey; BBC Formula One presenter, Jake Humphrey; football journalist and Talksport radio presenter, Adrian Durham; and the biologist, author and broadcaster, Prof. Brian J. Ford, who attended the King's School and still lives in Eastrea near Whittlesey. Local businessman, Peter Boizot, founder of the Pizza Express restaurant chain and Deputy Lieutenant of Cambridgeshire, has supported the cultural and sporting life of Peterborough and received its highest accolade, the freedom of the city. The thalidomide victim Terry Wiles, subject of the 1979 film On Giant's Shoulders, was born in the city.

In the sporting world, former Tottenham Hotspur and England footballer, David Bentley, was born in the city, as was Louis Smith, who at the 2008 games became Great Britain's first gymnast to win an individual Olympic medal in a century. Chelsea Football player, currently on loan at Luton Town footballer Isaiah Brown, was born in Peterborough, before joining Leicester City and later West Bromwich Albion, becoming the second youngest player to play in the Premier League. Harry Wells, a rugby union player for Leicester Tigers in Premiership Rugby, was born in Peterborough and attended The King's (The Cathedral) School.

== Freedom of the City ==
The following people, military units and organisations and groups have received the Freedom of the City of Peterborough.

=== Individuals ===
- Peter Boizot: 2007
- Wyndham Thomas, British architect, 19 September 2015
- Louis Smith: 21 March 2017
- James Fox: 21 March 2017
- Lee Manning: 21 March 2017
- Tommy Robson: 12 March 2020.

=== Military units ===
- RAF Wittering: 1983.
- 158 (Royal Anglian) Transport Regiment, Royal Logistic Corps (Volunteers): 25 July 2009.
- 115 (Peterborough) Squadron Air Training Corps: 28 April 2014.

=== Organisations and groups ===
- The Salvation Army (Peterborough Branch): 4 March 2015.
- Royal British Legion (Peterborough Branch): 28 July 2021.
