= Daniel Smith (nonfiction author) =

British writer

Daniel Smith is a British nonfiction writer with a particular interest in history and true crime. He has written more than 30 books. His most recent narrative non-fiction includes The Peer and the Gangster, which was long-listed for the Crime Writers' Association Gold Dagger for Non-Fiction, Scandal at Dolphin Square co-written with Simon Danczuk and The Drummond Affair: Murder and Mystery in Provence co-written with Stephanie Matthews.

== Life and career ==
For more than 20 years he was a contributing editor to The Statesman's Yearbook, a geo-political guide to every country in the world, published annually since 1864. His book subjects range from true crime to Sherlock Holmes, Steve Jobs and the Second World War.
