= Barry Turner =

Barry Turner may refer to:

- Barry Turner (politician) (born 1946), Canadian politician and lobbyist
- Barry Turner (author), British author, editor and journalist
- Barry Turner (American football) (born 1987), American football defensive end
