= The Lament of Swordy Well =

The Lament of Swordy Well is a poem written by John Clare in the 1830s.

== Synopsis ==
Clare personifies an old limestone quarry and heath that was close to his home in Helpston, Northamptonshire, and, using its voice, speaks of the despair it felt at the hardships of the poor and the land around it ever since it has been enclosed by the local parish. The poem is one of Clare's most famous protestation poems.

Swordy Well in Marholm, now Swaddywell, is an area of scientific interest. The Langdyke Countryside Trust established Swaddywell Pit nature reserve in 2003.

Poet Paul Farley celebrated Clare's work through this poem on BBC Radio 4 in 2008.
