= I Am (poem) =

1848 poem by John Clare

"I Am", "I Am!" (or "Lines: I Am") is a poem written by English poet John Clare in late 1844 or 1845 and published in 1848. It was composed when Clare was in the Northampton General Lunatic Asylum (commonly Northampton County Asylum, and later renamed St Andrew's Hospital), isolated by his mental illness from his family and friends.

== Background and structure ==
This poem, written in three stanzas of regular iambic pentameter with an "ababab" rhyme scheme in the first stanza, an "cdcdee" scheme for the second stanza and an "fgfghh" for the third stanza, details Clare's finding of a sanctuary from the travails of his life in the asylum by reasserting his individuality in life and love of the beauty of the natural world in which he will find peace in death. An irony of Clare writing a poem declaring "I am" is that at times during his years in asylums he believed he was Lord Byron and Shakespeare, even re-editing Byron's poems at one point.

The second stanza examines the alienation he feels from his family and friends due to his mental condition "And e'en the dearest – that I loved the best – / Are strange – nay, rather stranger than the rest". The final stanza adopts religious imagery, calling on God, recalling the garden of Eden and longing for the "vaulted sky", a reference to a cathedral-like heaven. It appears to both hope for a spiritual afterlife and accept the physical reality of peaceful repose in his beloved earth.

The house steward of the asylum, W. F. Knight, who worked there from April 1845 to the end of January 1850, transcribed the poem for Clare. The poem was first published on 1 January 1848 in the Bedford Times, or per other sources in the Annual Report of the Medical Superintendent of Saint Andrews for 1864, and later appeared with slightly altered text in Life of John Clare, the biography of the poet by Frederick Martin. The poem is known as Clare's "last lines" and is his most famous.

The poem's title is used for a 2003 collection of Clare's poetry, I Am: The Selected Poetry of John Clare, edited by his biographer Jonathan Bate, and it had previously been included in the 1992 Columbia University Press anthology, The Top 500 Poems.

The poem is not to be confused with a sonnet also written by Clare and also entitled "I Am" (or "I Only Know I Am", or "Sonnet: I Am"). The latter may, however, "be seen as a complementary piece".
