= John Clare Cottage =

Cottage in Helpston, Cambridgeshire, England

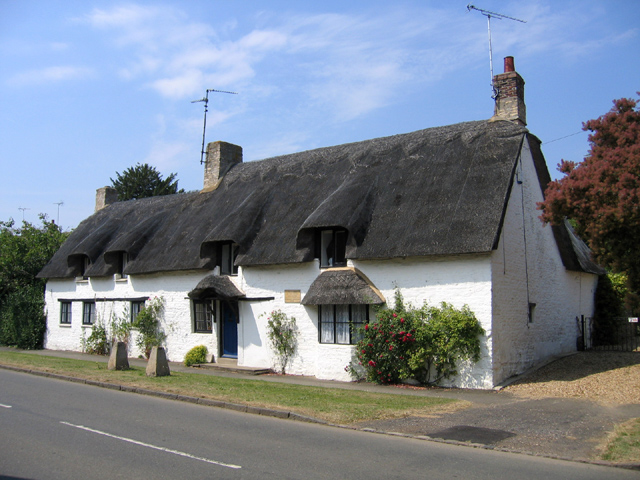
- Interactive map of the John Clare Cottage area

General information
- Location: 12 Woodgate, Helpston
- Coordinates: 52.6342°N 0.3446°W
- Named for: John Clare
- Owner: John Clare Trust

Website
- http://www.clarecottage.org/

Listed Building – Grade II*
- Official name: Clare Cottage
- Designated: 15 December 1955
- Reference no.: 1331603

John Clare Cottage is a cottage and literary museum in Helpston, Peterborough, United Kingdom. The cottage was the birthplace of English poet John Clare (1793–1864).

The thatched Grade II* cottage at 12 Woodgate, Helpston, originally consisted of five smaller tenement buildings, which were joined into a single structure at a later date.

The cottage was bought by the John Clare Trust in 2005. In May 2007, the Trust gained £1.27 million of funding from the Heritage Lottery Fund and commissioned Jefferson Sheard Architects to create a new landscape design and Visitor Centre, including a café, shop and exhibition space. The cottage was restored using traditional building methods and is open to the public.

In 2013 the John Clare Trust received a further grant from the Heritage Lottery Fund to help preserve the building and provide educational activities for young people visiting the cottage.

The garden behind the cottage is maintained by volunteers, and planted with varieties that would have been seen in Clare's time.

The John Clare Cottage forms part of the Fens Museum Partnership, along with Peterborough Museum and Flag Fen.

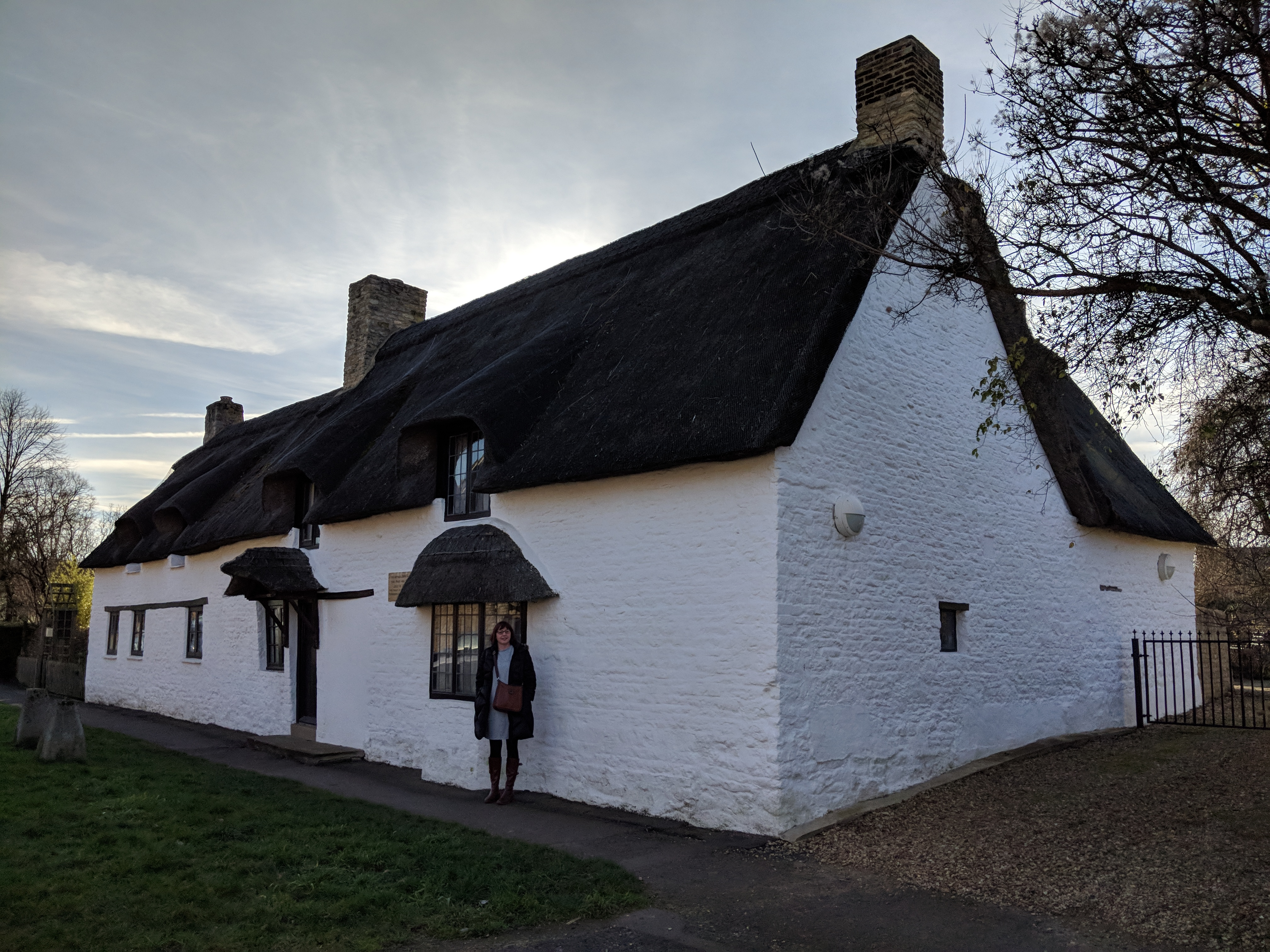
Clare Cottage in 2018

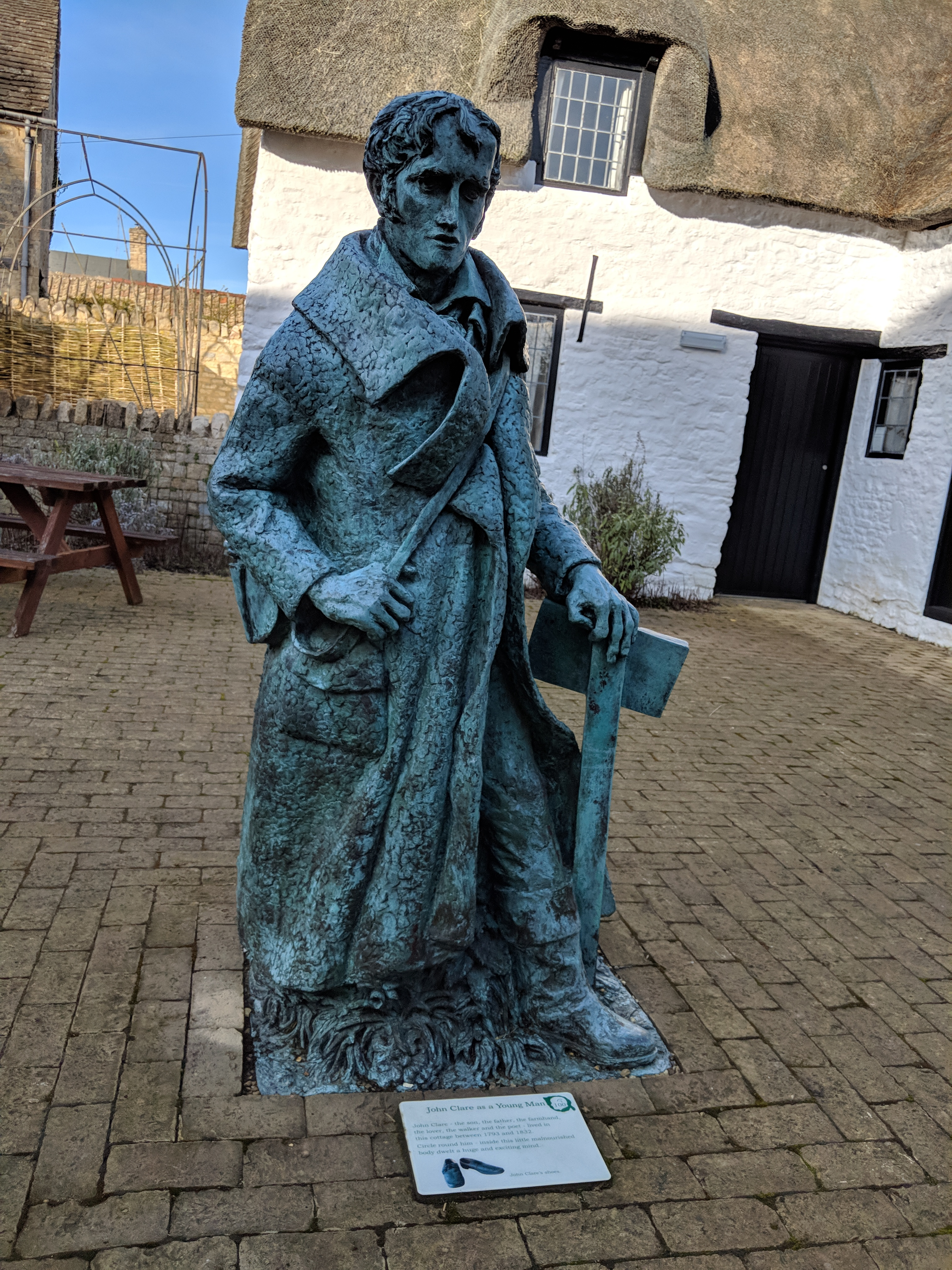
Statue of John Clare

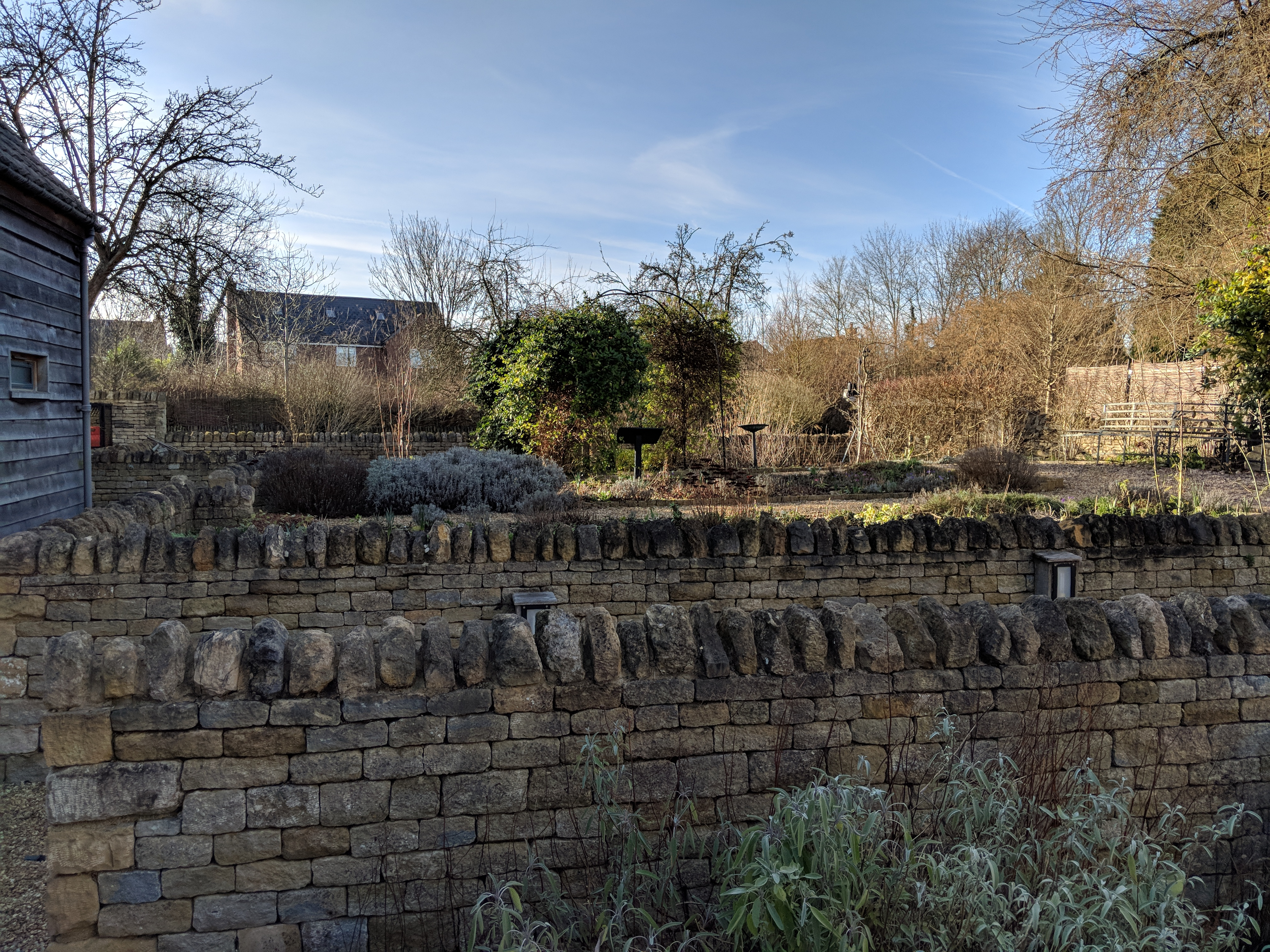
Cottage gardens

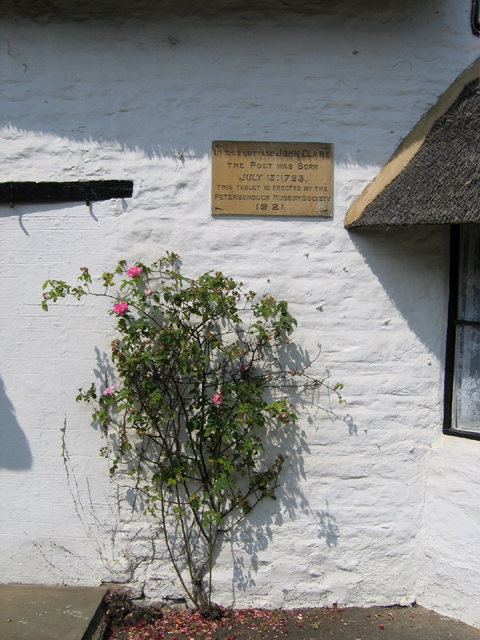
Plaque erected by the Peterborough Museum Society 1921
