= Chauncy Hare Townshend =

English poet

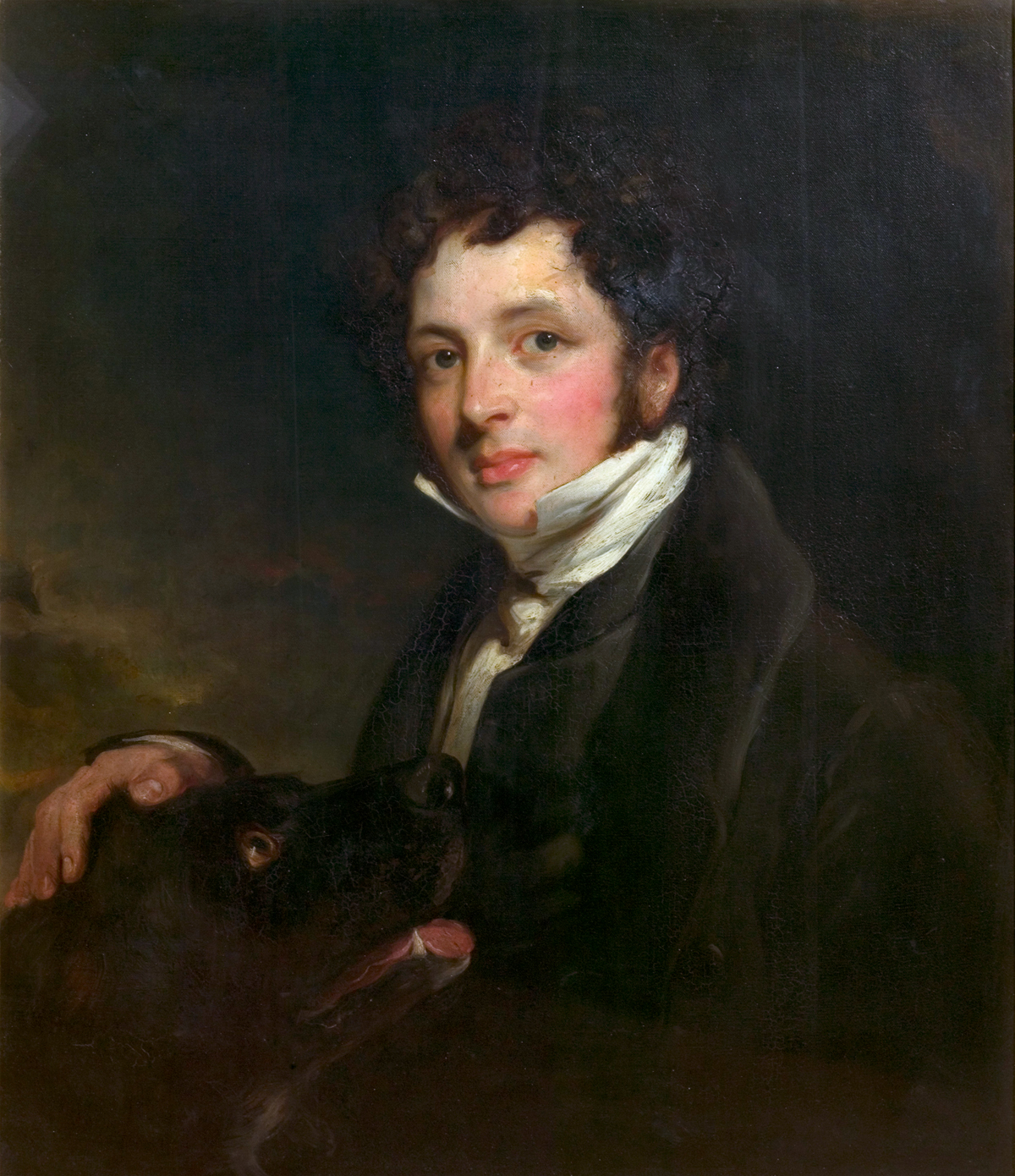
Chauncy Hare Townshend, ca. 1828, painted by John Boaden

Chauncy Hare Townshend, whose surname was spelt by his parents as Townsend (20 April 1798, Godalming, Surrey – 25 February 1868), was a 19th-century English poet, clergyman, mesmerist, collector, dilettante and hypochondriac. He is mostly remembered for bequeathing his collections to the South Kensington Museum (now the Victoria and Albert Museum) and the Wisbech & Fenland Museum in Wisbech, Cambridgeshire. He added an 'h' to his surname in 1835, upon inheriting; his first name was often spelled "Chauncey".

== Early life ==
Townshend was the only son of Henry Hare Townsend, whose maternal grandfather was Henry Hare, 3rd Baron Coleraine, and whose father (and thus Chauncy's grandfather) was James Townsend, Lord Mayor of London from 1772 – 1773 and a member of parliament. It was a rich family, with properties in Norfolk, London, and Switzerland, and the young Chauncy was educated at Eton College and Trinity Hall, Cambridge. He graduated BA in 1821 and MA in 1824, and won the Chancellor's Gold Medal in 1817 for his poem Jerusalem. He also played one game of first-class cricket for a Kent side in 1827.

== Life as a poet ==
Townshend met the poet Robert Southey in 1815, and through him met the Wordsworths and Coleridges.

A sonnet on John Clare was published in the Morning Post in 1820.

" There is a vivid lightning of the breast,
Flash'd from a kindred spark of poesy.
Which Poets only know, when rapt they see
Some hidden thought — some feeling unexprest
Upon the pages of the Bard imprest
In all the warmth of Nature's energy.
Oh, Clare! such answering electricity
Darts from thy numbers to my soul addrest.
Thou hast read Nature with a Poet's eye.
Thou hast felt Nature with a Poet's heart;
But the fine secrets which poetic art
Alone unravels — can alone impart —
And to which none but Poets' souls reply."

His encounter with John Clare was made famous in a book by Frederick Martin:

During the summer of 1821, Clare gave up his agricultural labours almost entirely. The greater part of the time he spent in roaming through woods and fields, planning new poems, and correcting those already made. Visits to Stamford, also, were frequent and of some duration, and he not unfrequently stayed three or four days together at the house of Mr. Gilchrist, or of Mr. Drury. The stream of visitors to Helpston had ceased, to a great extent, and the few that dropped in now and then were mostly of the better class, or at least not belonging to the vulgar-curious element. Among the number was Mr. Chauncey Hare Townsend, a dandyfied poet of some note, particularly gifted in madrigals and pastorals.

He came all the way from London to see Clare, and having taken a guide from Stamford to Helpston, was utterly amazed, on his arrival, to find that the cottage, beautifully depicted in the 'Village Minstrel', was not visible anywhere. His romantic scheme had been to seek Clare in his home, which he thought easy with the picture in his pocket; and having stepped over the flower-clad porch, to rush inside, with tenderly-dignified air, and drop into the arms of the brother poet. However, the scheme threatened to be frustrated, for though the village could easily be surveyed at a glance, such a cottage as that delineated in the 'Minstrel', with more regard to the ideal than the real, was nowhere to be seen. In his perplexity, Mr. Chauncey Hare Townsend inquired of a passer-by the way to Clare's house. The individual whom he addressed was a short, thick-set man, and, as Mr. Hare Townsend thought, decidedly ferocious-looking; he was bespattered with mud all over, and a thick knotted stick, which he carried in his hands, gave him something of the air of a highwayman. To the intense surprise of Mr. Chauncey Hare Townsend, this very vulgar person, when addressed, declared that he himself was John Clare, and offered to show the way to his house. Of course, the gentleman from London was too shrewd to be taken in by such a palpable device for being robbed; so declining the offer with thanks, and recovering from his fright by inhaling the perfume of his pocket handkerchief, he retreated on his path, seeking refuge in the 'Blue Bell' public house. The landlord's little girl was ready to show the way to Clare's cottage, and did so, leaving the stranger at the door. Mr. Townsend, now fairly prepared to fall into the arms of the brother poet, though not liking the look of his residence, cautiously opened the door; but started back immediately on beholding the highwayman in the middle of the room, sipping a basin of broth. There seemed a horrible conspiracy for the destruction of a literary gentleman from London in this Northamptonshire village. Mrs. Clare, fortunately, intervened at the nick of time to keep Mr. Townsend from fainting. Patty, always neatly dressed (save and except on washing days), approached the visitor; and her gentle looks re-assured Mr. Chauncey Hare Townsend. He wiped his hot brow with his scented handkerchief, and, not without emotion, introduced himself to the owner of the house and the neat little wife. The conversation which followed was short, and somewhat unsatisfactory on both sides, and the London poet, in the course of a short half an hour, quitted the Helpston minstrel, leaving a sonnet, wrapped in a one-pound note, behind him.

Clare frowned when discovering the nature of the envelope; but he liked the sonnet, and for the sake of it, and on Patty's petition, consented not to send it back to the giver.

The nature of this encounter was refuted in an extensive review in The Examiner, the date they met must have been 1820 (the year the sonnet was published) not 1821, as letters dated 1820 from Clare mention his visit. Neither did Townshend's memory of the visit tally with the book account.

Two volumes of his poetry were published in 1821,

== Friendship with Charles Dickens ==
In the 1830s Townshend studied mesmerism, and was the chief British exponent of the art after Dr. John Elliotson; he published two books and some articles and letters on the subject. Elliotson introduced Townshend to Charles Dickens, who also had an interest in mesmerism, and the two became lifelong friends. Townshend's volume of poetry The Three Gates (1859) was dedicated to Dickens, who in turn dedicated Great Expectations to Townshend; Dickens also gave Townshend the original manuscript of the novel, and his crystal ball.

== Later life ==
Townshend married Eliza Frances Norcott in 1826, but in 1843 they legally separated due to "un-happy differences", and he spent much of his life thereafter travelling abroad, collecting things as he went, and at his villa in Lausanne. Three further volumes of poetry emerged: Sermons in Sonnets, 1851, The Burning of the Amazon, 1856, and The Three Gates, 1859. He died on 25 February 1868 at 21 Norfolk Street, Park Lane, London, and is buried in the new cemetery in Godalming.

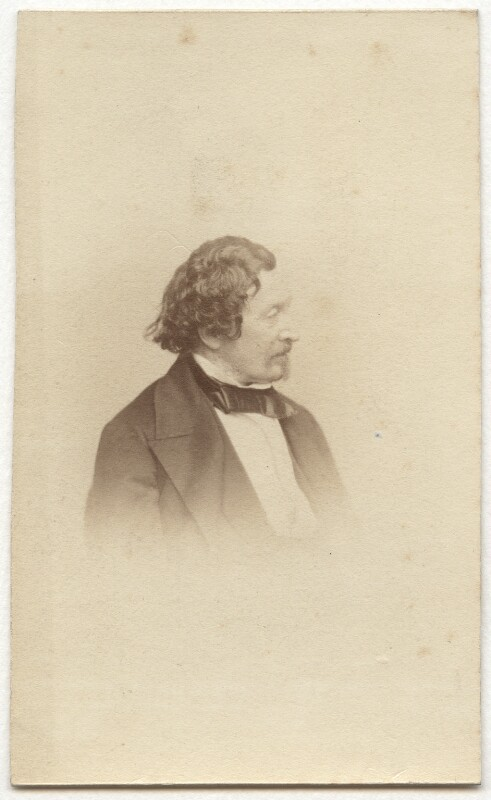
A photograph of Chauncy Hare Townshend in the 1860s

== Legacy ==
Nowadays Townshend is chiefly remembered for his bequests. Attached to his will of 1863 is an inventory of his collections, which lists 4464 books, 1411 paintings, engravings and prints (including works by Canaletto, Rubens and Teniers), 687 fossils, 9 cases of stuffed birds and animals, a large collection of coins, 622 specimens of gems and minerals, 267 pieces of jewellery, 5 portfolios of autographs and a collection of maps. Most of the artworks and photographs, and some of the books and jewellery were acquired by the South Kensington Museum in London, and most of the rest went to the Wisbech and Fenland Museum. This includes part of a Sèvres porcelain breakfast service thought to have been captured from Napoleon's baggage after the Battle of Waterloo, and the manuscript of Great Expectations. A street is named after him, Townsend Road near the park in Wisbech.

Under the terms of his will, his property was sold and given towards the provision of an elementary school in London. This school, the Burdett-Coutts and Townshend Foundation Church of England Primary School still exists in Rochester Street, Westminster, and bears a plaque saying:

The Chauncy Hare Townshend Schools. The Baroness Burdett-Coutts, the Revd. Thomas Helmore, executors and divisees of the Revd. Chauncy Hare Townshend, erected these schools as a memorial of friendship and furtherance of his pious wish. This corner stone was laid by their friend Hannah, widow of William Brown Esq. MD, on this 13th day of September 1876.

His will also appointed Charles Dickens as his literary executor:

I appoint my friend Charles Dickens, of Gad's Hill Place, in the County of Kent, Esquire, my literary executor; and beg of him to publish without alteration as much of my notes and reflections as may make known my opinions on religious matters, they being such as I verily believe would be conducive to the happiness of mankind.

a task which Dickens apparently was not expecting and did not enjoy. At any rate, Religious opinions by the late Reverend Chauncy Hare Townshend duly appeared in 1869.

== Publications ==
- Poems (1821); republished as The Weavers Boy, a tale; and other poems (1825)
- The Reigning Vice: A Satirical Essay (1827)
- A Descriptive Tour in Scotland (1839)
- Facts in Mesmerism; with Reasons for a dispassionate Inquiry into it. (1840)
- Sermons in Sonnets and Other Poems (1851)
- Philosophy in the Fens (1851), under the pseudonym T.Greatly
- Mesmerism Proved True (1854)
- The Burning of the Amazon (1852)
- The Three Gates (1861)
- Religious Opinions of the late Reverend Chauncy Hare Townshend (1869)
