= Barry Turner (author) =

British writer and editor (born 1937)

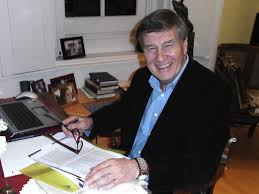
- Born: 4 October 1937 (age 88)
- Education: London School of Economics (BSc); London University (DipEd); London School of Economics (PhD)
- Occupations: writer, editor
- Years active: 1970–present

Barry Turner (born 4 October 1937) is a British writer, editor and former journalist.

== Career ==
Turner started his career as a teacher before turning to journalism with The Observer and making many appearances on radio and television. His first book, a study of British politics in the early Twentieth Century, was published in 1970. While writing and presenting documentary series for Thames Television, Yorkshire and Granada Television, he co-authored Adventures in Education and wrote Equality for Some, a history of girls' education. In 1972, he wrote A Place in the Country, a bestseller about life in the great country houses which inspired a television series.

In the mid-1970s, Turner joined Macmillan to develop a general non-fiction list before turning to marketing as a director of the academic press responsible for world sales. Returning to full-time writing in the early 1980s, he produced a wide range of work from theatrical biographies to a political and economic study of the five Nordic countries, The Other European Community. The story of ten thousand refugee children who escaped to Britain from Nazi Germany, ...And the Policeman Smiled, was published by Bloomsbury Publishing in 1990. For many years he wrote on travel for The Times and reviewed and serialised books for the paper. He reviews classic crime novels for the Daily Mail.

As founding editor of The Writer’s Handbook Turner took this annual reference title through to its twenty-fourth (final) edition. He was editor of The Statesman's Yearbook from 1997 to 2014. He is a founder member and former chairman of the National Academy of Writing.

== Bibliography ==
- Adventures in Education (1969)
- Free Trade and Protection (1971)
- A Place in the Country (1972)
- Equality for Some (1974)
- Sweden (1976)
- The Other European Community: Integration and Cooperation in Nordic Europe (1982)
- The Playgoer’s Companion (1983)
- A Jobbing Actor (1984)
- Richard Burton (1987)
- Marks of Distinction (1988)
- East End, West End (1990)
- …And the Policeman Smiled (1990)
- The Long Horizon (1993)
- Quest for Love (1994)
- When Daddy Came Home (1995)
- The Writer’s Companion (1996)
- One Small Suitcase (2003)
- Countdown to Victory (2004)
- Suez 1956: The inside story of the first oil war (2006)
- The Connected Screenwriter: A Comprehensive Guide to the U.S. and International Studios, Networks, Production Companies, and Filmmakers that Want to Buy Your Screenplay (2009)
- Outpost of Occupation: How the Channel Islands survived Nazi rule, 1940–45 (2010)
- Beacon for Change: How the Festival of Britain shaped the modern age (2011)
- The Victorian Parson (2015)
- Karl Doenitz and the Last Days of the Third Reich (2015)
- The Berlin Airlift: The Relief Operation that Defined the Cold War (2017)
- Men of Letters: The Story of Garrick Writers (2019)
- Waiting for War: Britain 1939-1940 (2019)
- Thorns in the Crown (2022)
- Piccadilly: The Story of the World's Most Famous Thoroughfare (2023)
- Covent Garden and Strand: A History (2025)
