= Anne Tibble =

Anne Tibble, date unknown

Anne Tibble (née Mabel Anne Northgrave) was an English writer, who was best known for her studies of the life and work of the poet John Clare in partnership with J.W. Tibble. As well as two novels and a collection of poetry, she wrote three volumes of autobiography, biographies for children of well-known people, a book about African literature and reviews for various journals.

== Personal life ==
She went to Leeds University, taught for a while and married John William Tibble in 1927. They had two children and lived in various parts of England, ending in a cottage in Northamptonshire where Anne Tibble lived alone for the last few years of her life after her husband's death. She died on 31 August 1980.

== Works about John Clare ==
Tibble was Clare's biographer and "indefatigable champion", and an "anthologist and editor of neglected and forgotten work by John Clare", along with her husband John. In 1932 their first book on Clare, John Clare: A Life, followed "five years patient research among the thousands of letters, poems, and prose fragments which Clare carefully preserved…" It was widely seen as a work of importance in its field: "complete and definitive" said one critic. The Times reviewer said "It is improbable that the work of Mr and Mrs Tibble… will ever be superseded." When it was revised and expanded as John Clare: His Life and Poetry in 1956 Angus Wilson said, "The authors have never allowed their scholarship to weigh down their narrative, nor their devotion to Clare to distort their just estimate of his minor, though unique, place in English letters. However, a lengthy review by Geoffrey Grigson pointed to various "critical deficiencies" in the authors' approach. Other books of theirs about Clare include Selected Poems, The Midsummer Cushion, and The Journal, Essays, the Journey from Essex.

== Other writing ==
The autobiographical trilogy she wrote in the 1970s - Greenhorn, One Woman's Story and Alone - took readers from Tibble's early life in Yorkshire to her days as a widow. Displaying candour, perception and "openness to every kind of experience", these books may be her best remembered writing apart from the work on Clare. She also published two novels, Apples Redden (1942) and The God Spigo (1976), a volume of poetry, Labyrinth (1972), and a book on African-English literature (1965). Her children's books about famous people included a biography of Gertrude Bell, granddaughter of the Bell who built Tibble's childhood home.
