= Frederick Martin (editor) =

Frederick Martin (1830–1883) was a British writer of Swiss-German background, known as the editor of The Statesman's Year Book.

== Life ==
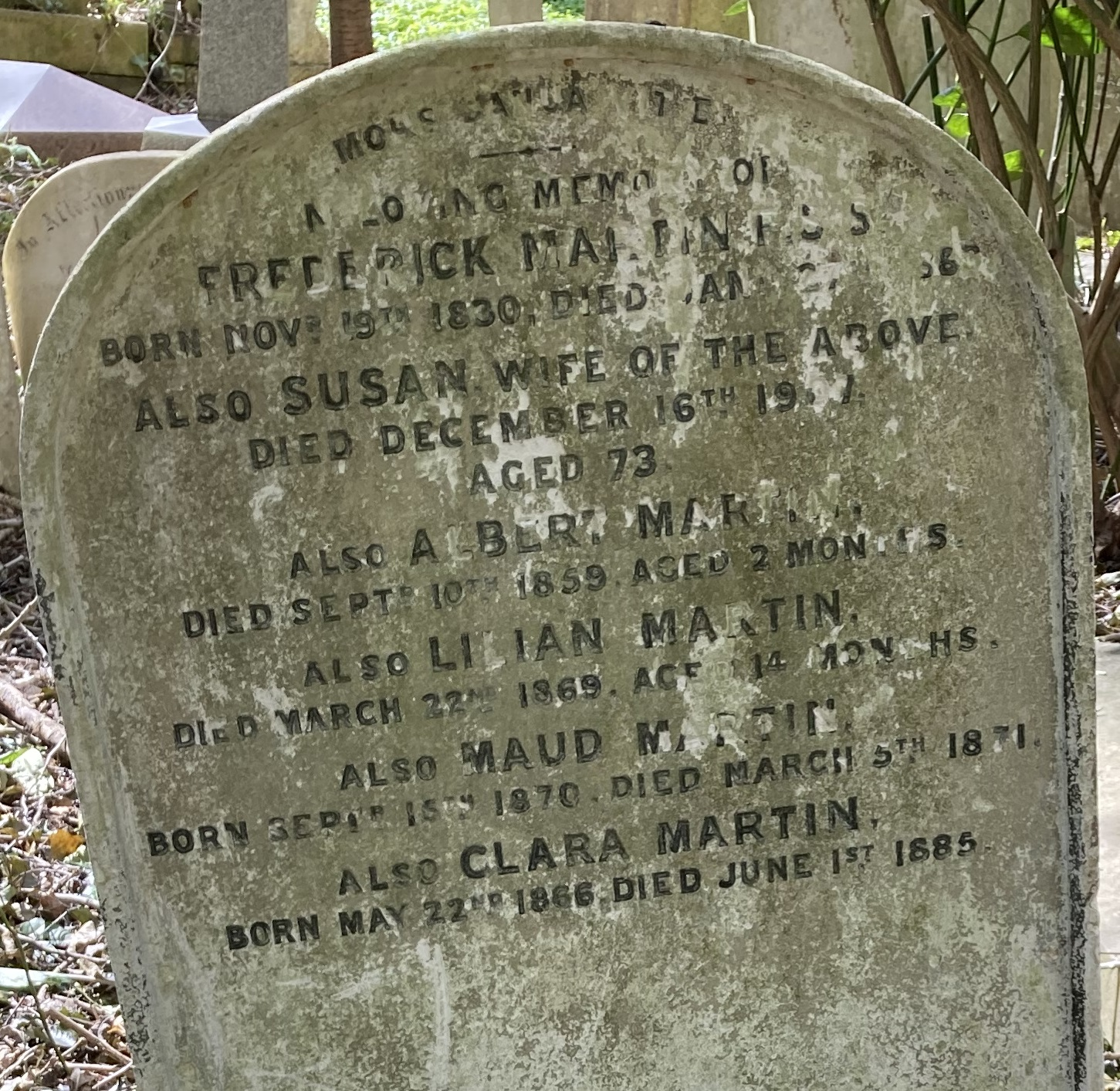
Grave of Frederick Martin in Highgate Cemetery

Born at Geneva, Switzerland, on 19 November 1830, Martin was educated at Heidelberg. He settled in England at an early age. For some years after 1856 he was secretary and amanuensis to Thomas Carlyle, whom he helped in historical researches.

In 1879 Lord Beaconsfield, who found The Statesman's Year-Book useful, awarded Martin a pension of £100 a year. He died on 27 January 1883 at his house in Lady Margaret Road, in north-west London, leaving a widow and family.

== Works ==
Martin started a short-lived biographical magazine called The Statesman, in which he began an account of Carlyle's early life. Carlyle objected, so Martin closed it down. He inaugurated The Statesman's Year-Book in 1864. He continued to supervise it till December 1882, when he was compelled by ill-health to give it up, and it was taken over by John Scott Keltie.

Martin's other works included:

- The Life of John Clare, London, 1866.
- Stories of Banks and Bankers, London, 1866.
- Commercial Handbook of France, London, 1867.
- The Story of Alec Drummond of the 17th Lancers, 3 vols. London, 1869.
- Handbook of Contemporary Biography, London, 1870.
- The History of Lloyd's and of Marine Insurance in Great Britain, London, 1876.
- The Property and Revenues of the English Church Establishment,' London, 1877.

Martin contributed a memoir of Thomas Chatterton, prefixed to an edition of the latter's Poems (1865); superintended a new edition of John Ramsay MacCulloch's Geographical Dictionary (1866); and revised the fifth edition of George Henry Townsend's Manual of Dates (1877). He wrote for various newspapers, and was an occasional contributor to the Athenæum. He contributed to the second volume of The National History of England (1873, 4 vols.)

== Notes ==
Attribution

This article incorporates text from a publication now in the public domain: Lee, Sidney, ed. (1893). "Martin, Frederick". Dictionary of National Biography. Vol. 36. London: Smith, Elder & Co.
