= Peterborough Museum and Art Gallery =

History and art museum in Peterborough, England

Coordinates: 52.57176°N 0.2459°W

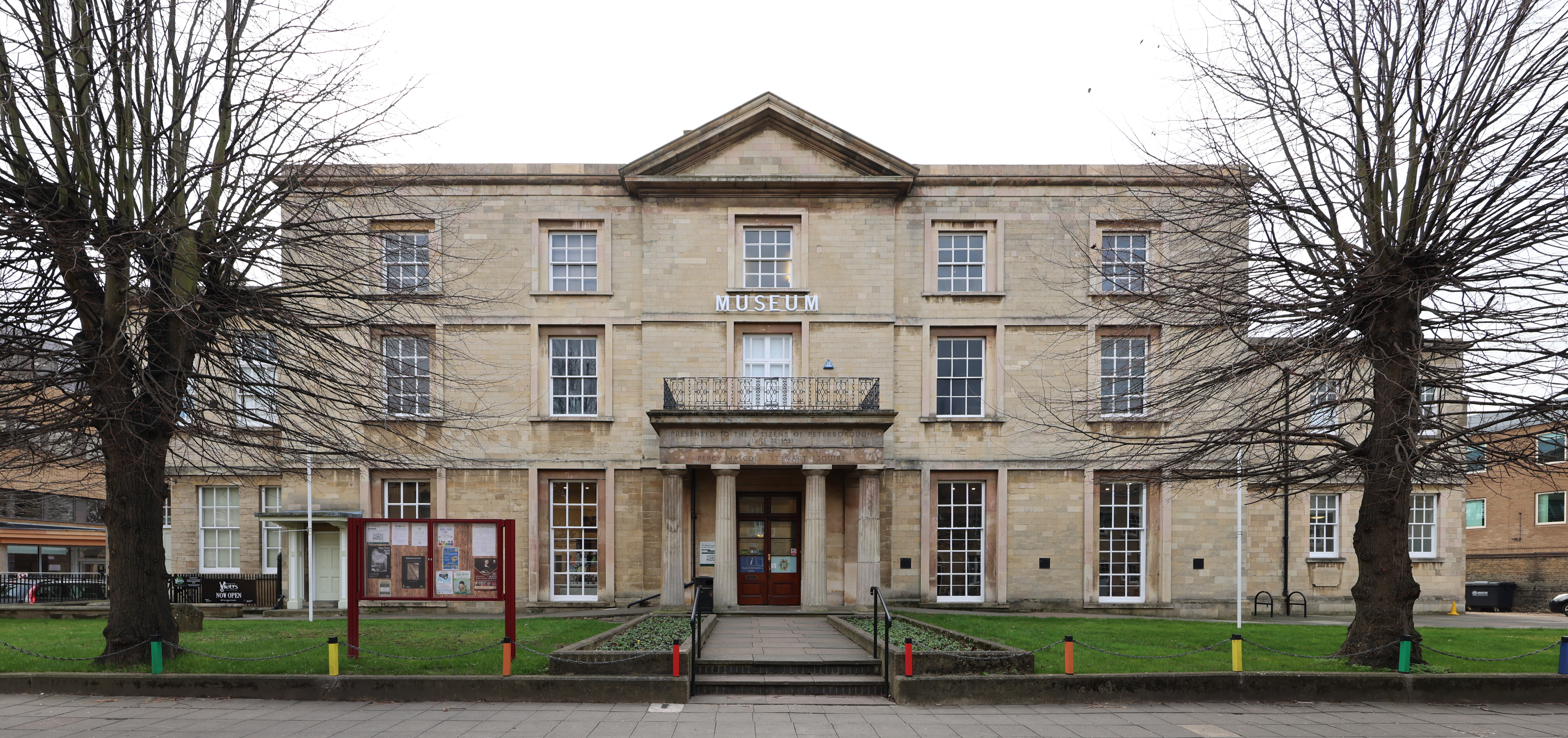
The Museum and Art Gallery, Priestgate, Peterborough.

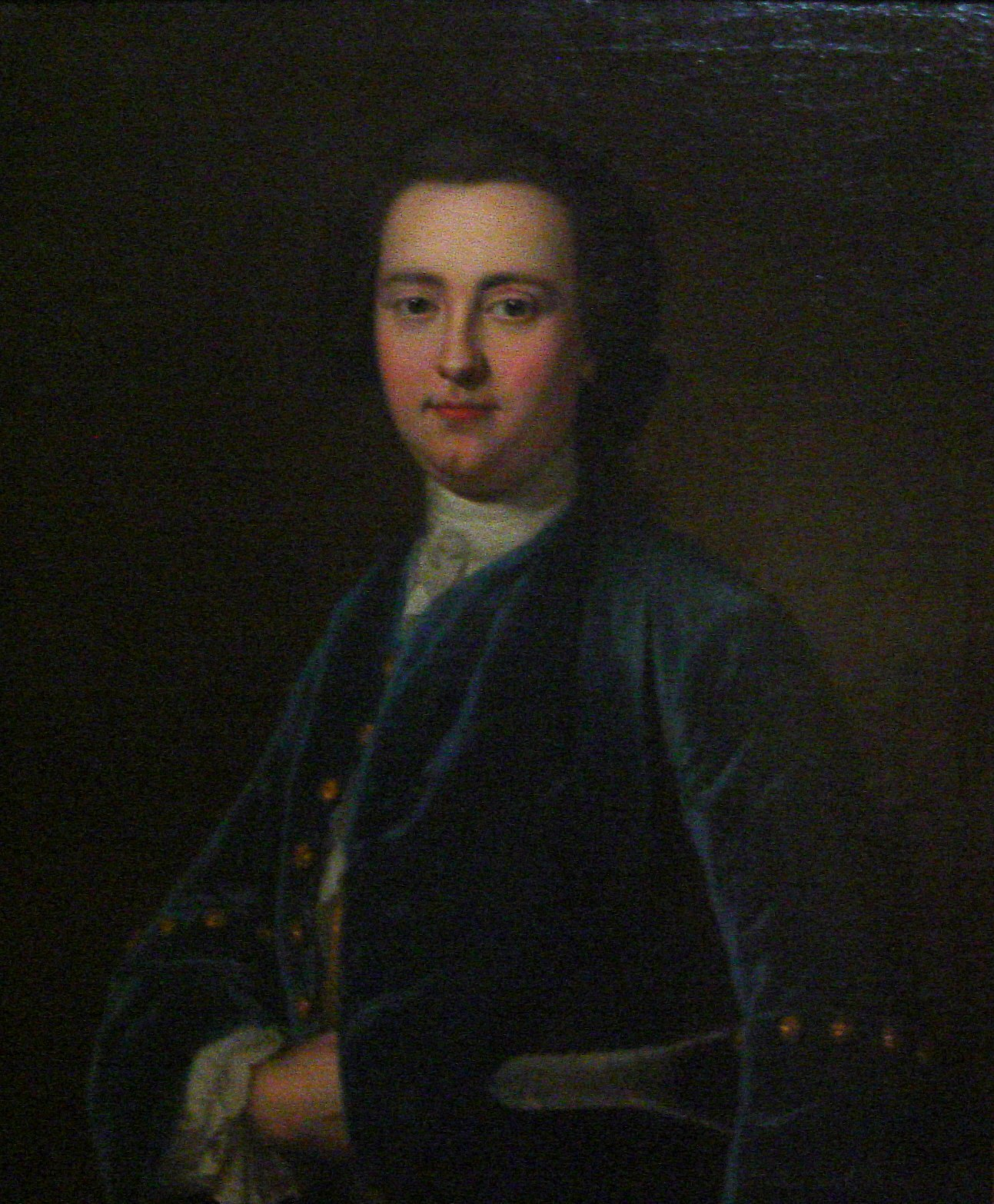
Portrait of George Montagu by John Giles Eccardt after Jean-Baptiste van Loo (c. 1739–1750).

Peterborough Museum and Art Gallery houses the historical and art collections of the city of Peterborough in Cambridgeshire, England. Managed by Peterborough Limited on behalf of the city council, it is part of the Museums in Cambridgeshire (MiC) partnership.

== History ==
Finding its roots in the Peterborough Natural History, Scientific and Archaeological Society formed in 1871, the museum's collection officially started in 1880. Originally displayed in a room on Long Causeway, Peterborough, it moved in 1887 to Becket Chapel on Cathedral grounds and again in 1907 to Barrass Memorial Hall, Queen Street. All sites have subsequently been demolished.

It would remain there until 1925, when the premises would be purchased by a printing company. The Society would then rent an unnamed building on Park Road which would eventually house the Theatre Royal until its closure.

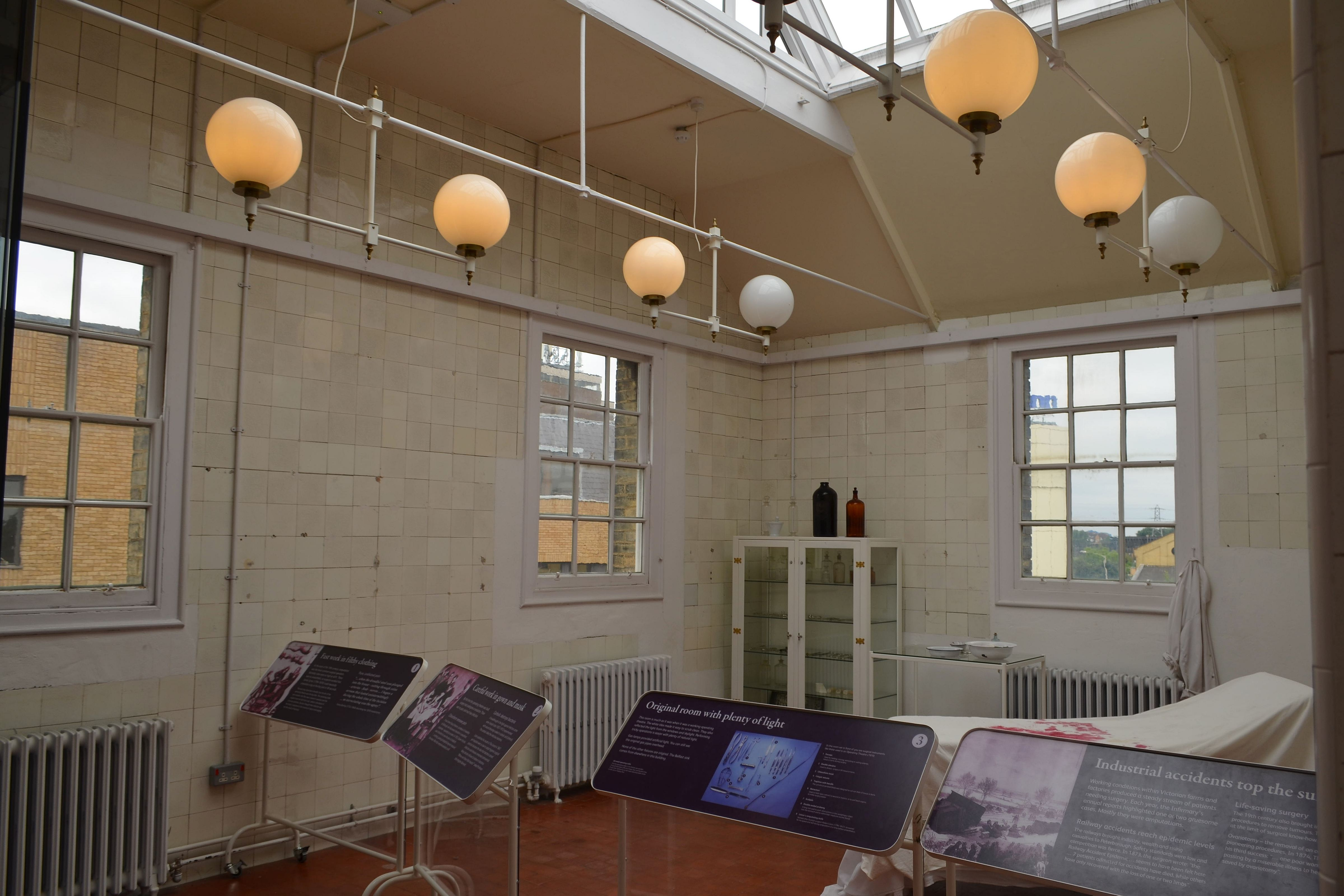
Victorian operating theatre

The current building on Priestgate was acquired and donated to the Society in 1931 by Sir Percy Malcolm Stewart. The art gallery was later constructed in 1939.

Originally a private house dating from 1816, with parts of the cellar dating back to an older house built in the 16th century, the Priestgate mansion had been sold to Earl Fitzwilliam in 1856. He allowed it to be used as a public dispensary and infirmary – the city's first hospital – from 1857 until the opening of the War Memorial Hospital in 1928. In 1968, it was presented to the city by the Peterborough Museum Society.

From 2010 to 2019, the museum was managed on behalf of the city council by Vivacity, an independent not-for-profit organisation with charitable status, which also ran the Key Theatre and the city's libraries.

It is currently managed by Peterborough Limited, a Local Authority Trading Company under Peterborough City Council.

== Collections ==
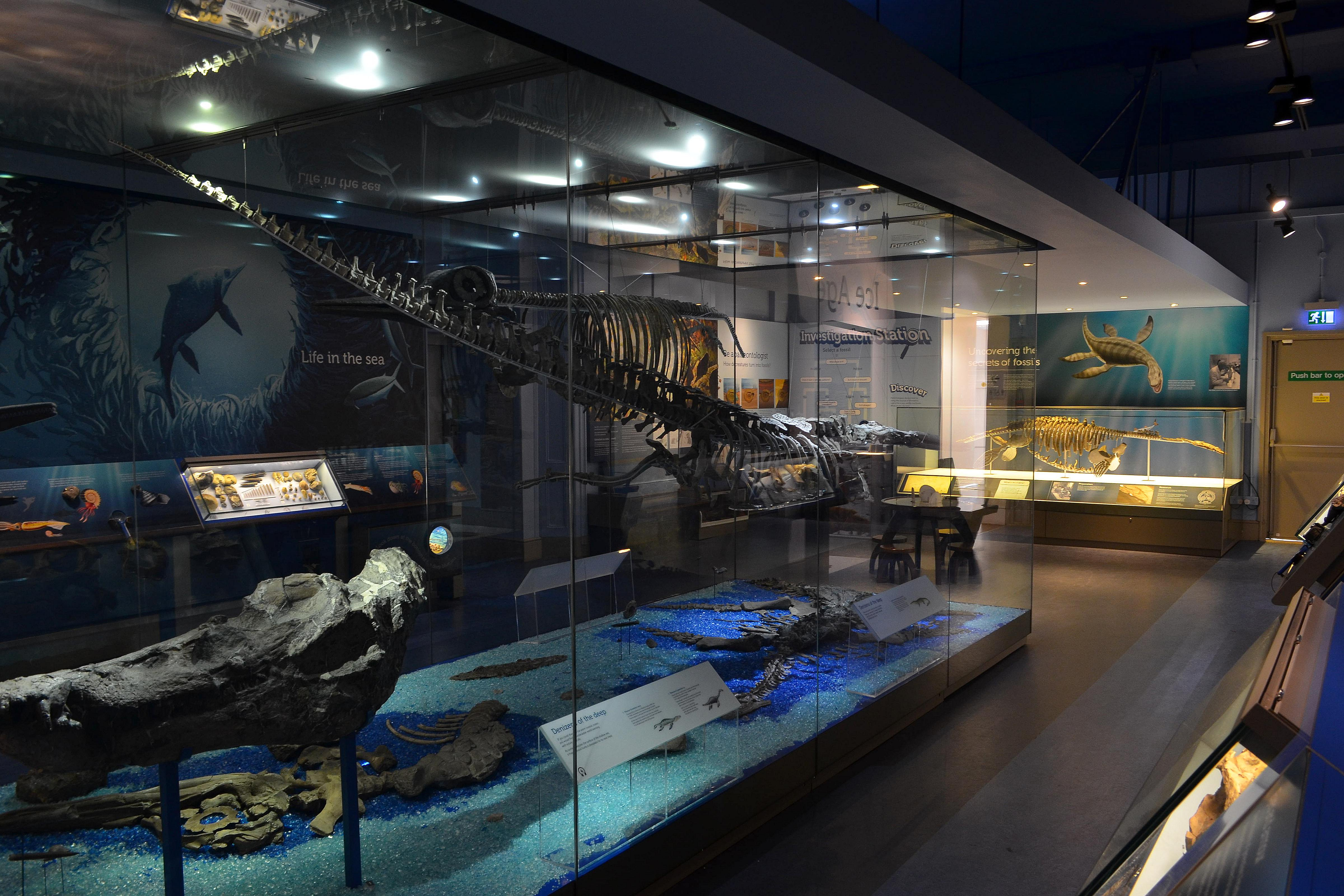
Marine fossils

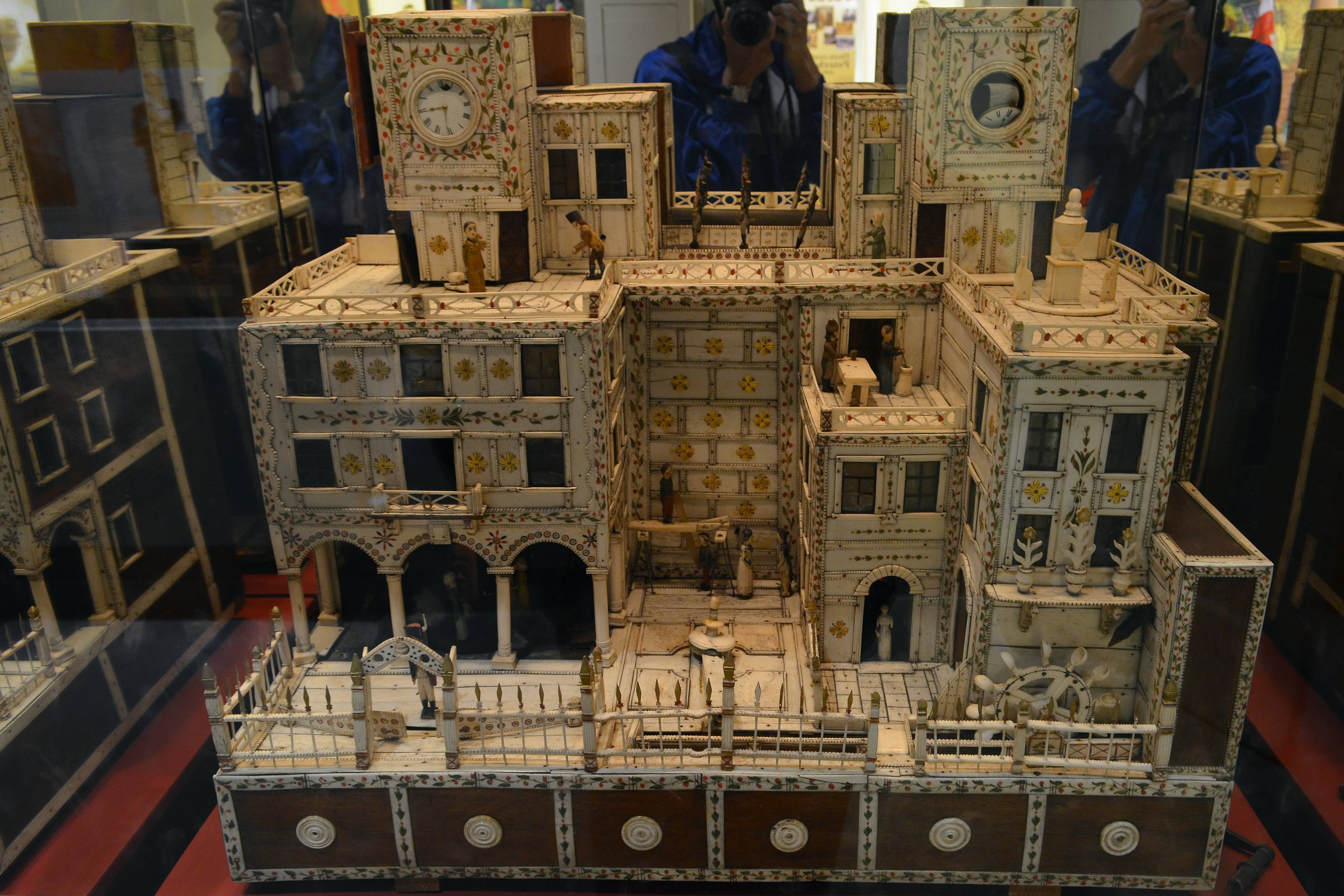
Norman Cross doll house

Peterborough Museum has a collection of some 227,000 objects, including local archaeology and social history ranging from the products of the Roman pottery industry to a collection of marine fossil remains of international importance from the Jurassic period.

The museum also contains the original manuscripts of John Clare, the "Northamptonshire Peasant Poet" as he was commonly known in his own time and the Norman Cross collection of items made by French prisoners of war. These prisoners were kept at Norman Cross Prison on the outskirts of Peterborough from 1797 to 1814, in what is believed to be the world's first purpose-built prisoner-of-war camp.

The art collection contains a variety of paintings, prints and drawings dating from the 17th century to the present day.

== See also ==
- Flag Fen
- John Clare Cottage
