= Five Flower Songs =

Choral composition by Benjamin Britten

- Part songs by Benjamin Britten
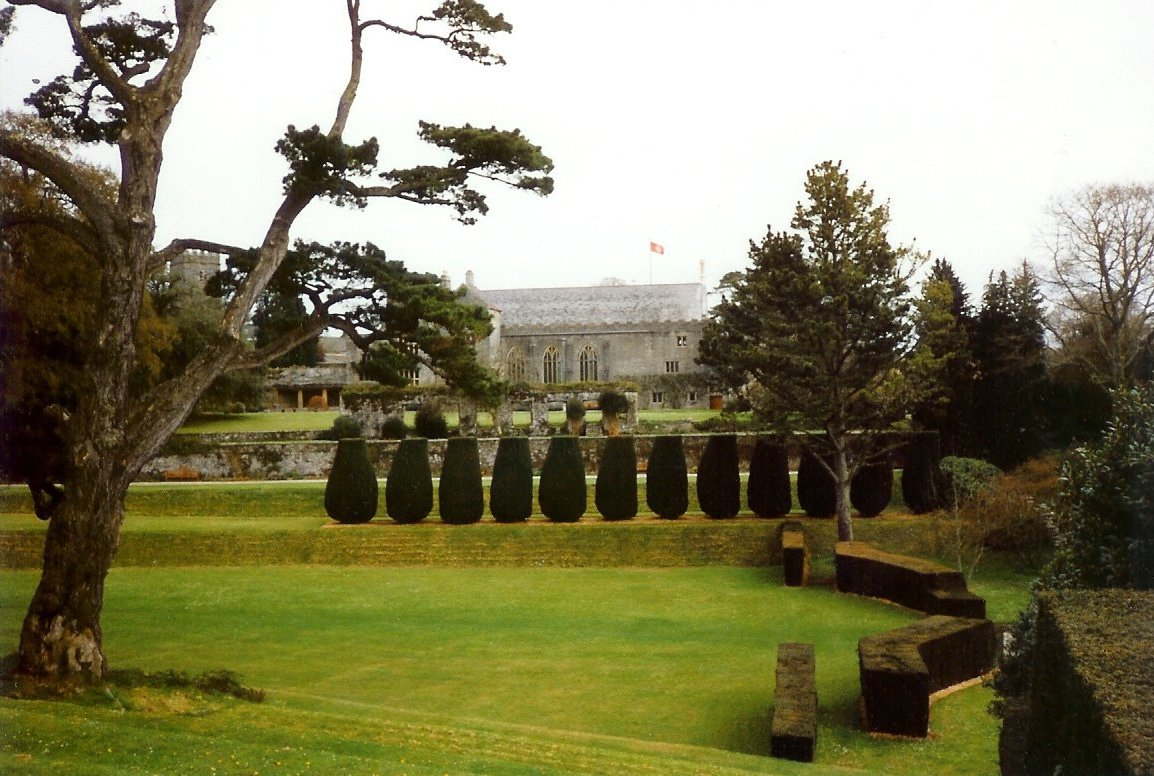
- Dartington Hall, where the part songs were first performed
- Opus: 47
- Text: poems
- Language: English
- Dedication: 25th wedding anniversary of Leonard and Dorothy Elmhirst
- Performed: 23 July 1950:
- Scoring: four-part choir (SATB)

Benjamin Britten's Five Flower Songs, Op. 47, is a set of five part songs to poems in English by four authors which mention flowers, composed for four voices (SATB) in 1950 as a gift for the 25th wedding anniversary of Leonard and Dorothy Elmhirst. It was first performed in the open air at the couple's estate Dartington Hall, with Imogen Holst conducting a student choir. The set has been frequently recorded by English and foreign chamber choirs and ensembles, including Polyphony, Cambridge Singers and the RIAS Kammerchor.

== History ==
Britten composed the music as a contribution to commemorate the 25th wedding anniversary of Leonard and Dorothy Elmhirst, who were both botanists, philanthropists, and fond of flowers. Leonard Elmhirst was an agronomist who developed depressed rural regions such as in India and Devon county. Dorothy Elmhirst was a wealthy American, supporting education and women's rights. They had gardens at their estate, Dartington Hall.

Britten wrote the part songs in the tradition of Edward Elgar, Parry and Charles Villiers Stanford. He scored the works for a four-part unaccompanied choir. He took into account that a student choir would perform the premiere on 23 July 1950 in the open air. The first performance was conducted at Dartington Hall by Imogen Holst. It was published by Boosey & Hawkes.

== Texts and music ==
The music is based on five poems by four different authors, all related to flowers:

1. To Daffodils, by Robert Herrick
2. The Succession of the Four Sweet Months, by Herrick
3. Marsh Flowers, by George Crabbe
4. The Evening Primrose, by John Clare
5. The Ballad of Green Broom, anon.

The music is in five movements, which Britten designed to be in that order, with mood-changes in mind. It has been named a song cycle. The duration is given as around 11 minutes.

To Daffodils is marked Allegro impetuoso. The text by Robert Herrick is a metaphor of life passing. In The Succession of the Four Sweet Months, also by Herrick, each month is assigned a voice part to begin a fugal setting. Marsh Flowers is a setting of a poem by George Crabbe who had also written the poems on which Britten's opera Peter Grimes was based. Britten created "a slightly menacing atmosphere", giving individual identity to flowers described as "slimy", "faded" or with "sickly scent". Evening Primrose, on a poem by John Clare, serves as the set's slow movement, depicting a nightscape, with the music turning to slumber. The anonymous The Ballad of Green Broom has been described as "a tour-de-force of humour", with a gradual accelerando, as an exciting closing movement. The tempo at the beginning is Cominciando esitando ("Beginning hesitantly"), the tenors begin as a ballad singer, while the other voices imitate guitar sounds, introducing a young lazy flower-cutter. The voices take turns telling the story, with increasing tempo, up to a final wedding to a rich woman, marked Vivace, with the first "guitar" chords as joyous and sonorous wedding bells.

== Recordings ==
Five Flower Songs was recorded by the Elizabethan Singers conducted by Louis Halsey in 1965. It became part of the composer's complete recordings. Paul Spicer conducted the Finzi Singers in a 1997 recording of Five Flower Songs as vol. 3 of the series Britten / The Choral Edition for the Chandos label. The cycle was recorded in 2000 by Polyphony, conducted by Stephen Layton, together with other choral music by Britten. The Cambridge Singers, conducted by John Rutter, recorded the songs as the conclusion of a collection There is sweet music of English part songs, by Stanford, Frederick Delius, Elgar, Gustav Holst and Percy Grainger, among others. The RIAS Kammerchor, conducted by Justin Doyle, recorded the cycle, along with other Britten works.
