= The Statesman's Yearbook =

International reference work, 1864-present

- Statesman's Year-Book 1921
- Original title: The Statesman's Yearbook: A Statistical, Genealogical, and Historical Account of the States and Sovereigns of the Civilised World for the Year ____.
- Country: United Kingdom
- Language: English
- Discipline: Reference work: World history and politics
- Publisher: Palgrave Macmillan
- Published: 1864-present
- No. of books: 160 (as of 2024)
- OCLC: 1011810563
- Website: link.springer.com/series/15683

The Statesman's Yearbook is a one-volume reference book published annually since 1864 providing information on the countries of the world. It is published by Palgrave Macmillan.

== History ==
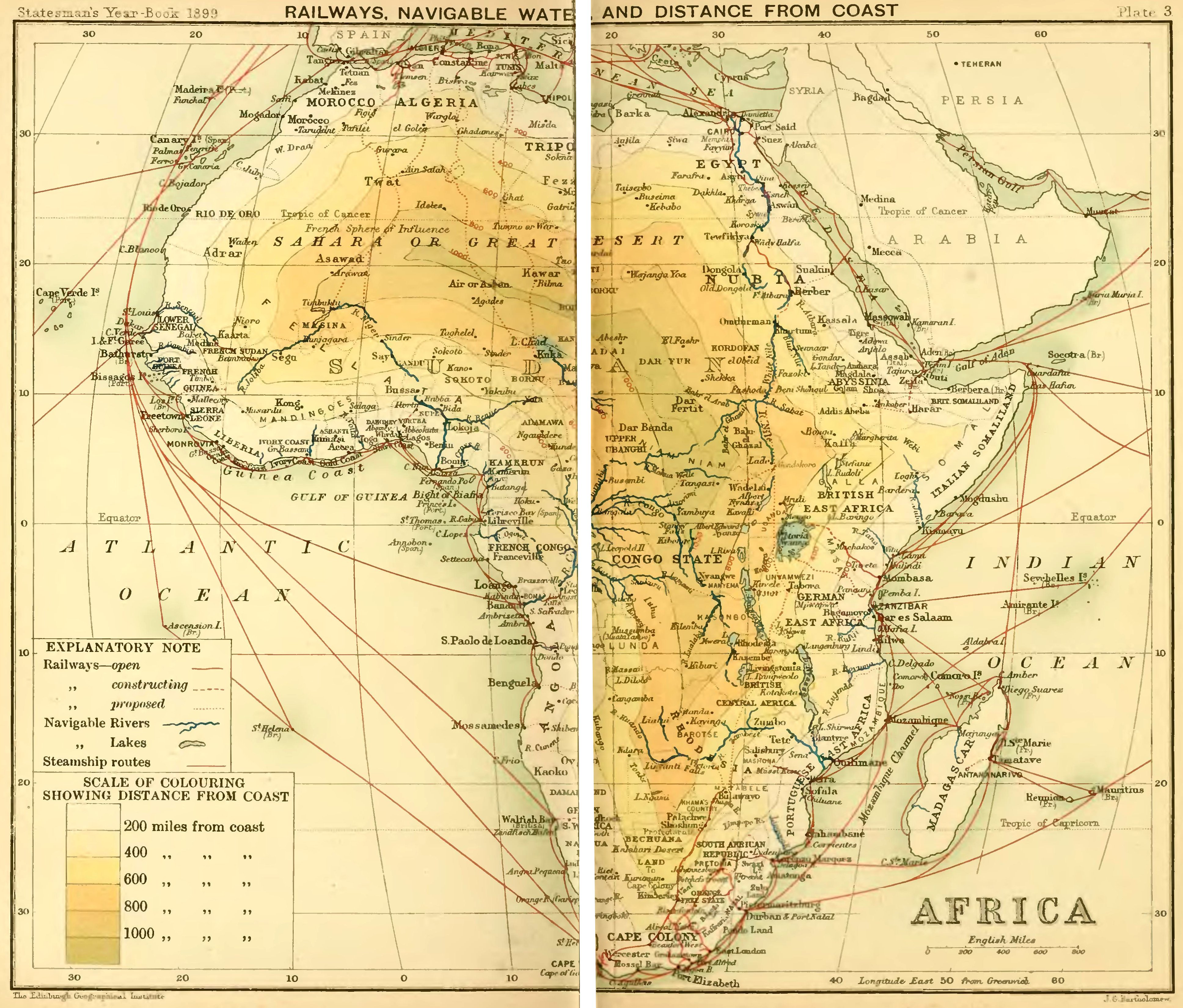
Railway map of Africa, including tracks proposed and under construction, The Statesman's Yearbook, 1899.

In the middle of the nineteenth century, the British Prime Minister Robert Peel suggested to Alexander Macmillan (of the family publishing house) the publication of “a handbook presenting in a compact shape a picture of the actual conditions, political and social of the various states in the civilised world.”

The first volume was published for 1864. Frederick Martin was its foundational editor, and presided over the book for twenty years, during which time it became established as a leading reference work.

According to Steinberg in 1966, the words Martin used in the preface of the first issue of the Statesman's Year-Book still applied to every volume a century later: "The great aim has been to insure an absolute correctness of the multiplicity of facts and figures given in the Statesman's Year-Book. For this purpose, none but official documents have been consulted in the first instance, and only when these failed or were manifestly imperfect, recourse has been had to authoritative books and influential newspapers, magazines and other reliable information."

His successor, Scottish journalist John Scott Keltie, took over in 1883. An author, editor, scholar, and passionate geographer, he introduced the insertion of thumbnail maps of each country and large political world maps. The cartographic illustration of networks of communication began in 1899 when two maps displayed the railways, navigable waters and telegraphic lines of Africa.

After Scott-Keltie's death in 1927, his sometime co-editor Mortimer Epstein took over and edited the work for over twenty years including, remarkably, during World War II when the book continued to be published yearly, despite the rationing of paper.

Epstein died in 1946, and his successor Henry Steinberg was faced with the challenge of producing a new Statesman's Yearbook for an ever-changing world, as new countries came into being and others ceased to exist. His passion for the task, sharp mind and amiable nature meant that The Statesman’s Yearbook swiftly adapted to the new world order.

Steinberg continued as Editor until 1969 when his assistant, John Paxton, took over. Brian Hunter edited between 1990 and 1997 and Barry Turner took over in 1997.

=== List of editors ===
- Frederick Martin (1864–1883)
- Sir John Scott-Keltie (1883–1926)
- Mortimer Epstein (1927–1946)
- S. H. Steinberg (Sigfrid Henry Steinberg) (1946–1969)
- John Paxton (1969–1990)
- Brian Hunter (1990–1997)
- Barry Turner (1997–2014)

=== Current edition ===
- Palgrave Macmillan (2018). The Statesman's Yearbook: The Politics, Cultures and Economies of the World, 2018 (154 ed.). Palgrave Macmillan. ISBN 978-1-137-50852-2. OCLC 1023862807.

== See also ==
- Whitaker's Almanack
- The World Factbook
- The Annual Register
