= Helpston =

Village in Cambridgeshire, England

Coordinates: 52.635°N 0.344°W

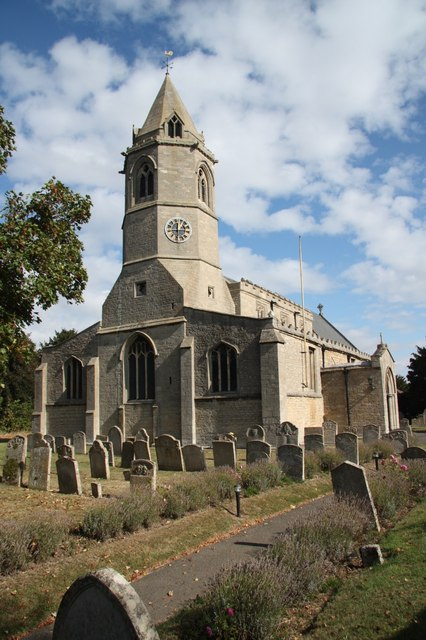
- St Botolph's Church

- Location within Cambridgeshire
- Population: 981
- OS grid reference: TF1205
- Unitary authority: Peterborough
- Ceremonial county: Cambridgeshire
- Region: East
- Country: England
- Sovereign state: United Kingdom
- Post town: Peterborough
- Postcode district: PE6
- Dialling code: 01733
- Police: Cambridgeshire
- Fire: Cambridgeshire
- Ambulance: East of England

Helpston (also, formerly, "Helpstone") is an English village in Cambridgeshire. Historically; it was formerly in the Soke of Peterborough in Northamptonshire, subsequently (1965–1974) in Huntingdon and Peterborough, then in Cambridgeshire. It is administered by the City of Peterborough unitary authority.

The civil parish of Helpston covers an area of 1,860 acres (750 ha) and had an estimated population in 2011 of 981.

The parish church is dedicated to St Botolph; the chancel window was created by Francis Skeat and depicts "Christ in Majesty".

The poet John Clare was born in Helpston in 1793 and is buried in the churchyard of St Botolph's. The thatched cottage where he was born was bought by the John Clare Trust in 2005. The John Clare Cottage, at 12 Woodgate, has been restored using traditional building methods and is open to the public. In 2013 the John Clare Trust received a grant from the Heritage Lottery Fund to help preserve the building and provide educational activities for youngsters visiting the cottage. John Clare Primary School is named after the poet.

The name Helpston is Anglo-Saxon in origin and means the farmstead (tun) first settled by Help (an Old English personal name). Helpston is well known for its athletics club, Helpston Harriers AC, who aspire to improve local running standards.

In July 1822 it was reported that a deodand of 20 shillings was laid upon the cart held responsible for the death of John Price, aged twelve, the driver of the cart. The inquest was held at the Bell Inn. Deodands were abolished under the Deodands Act 1846 24 years later.

== Gallery ==
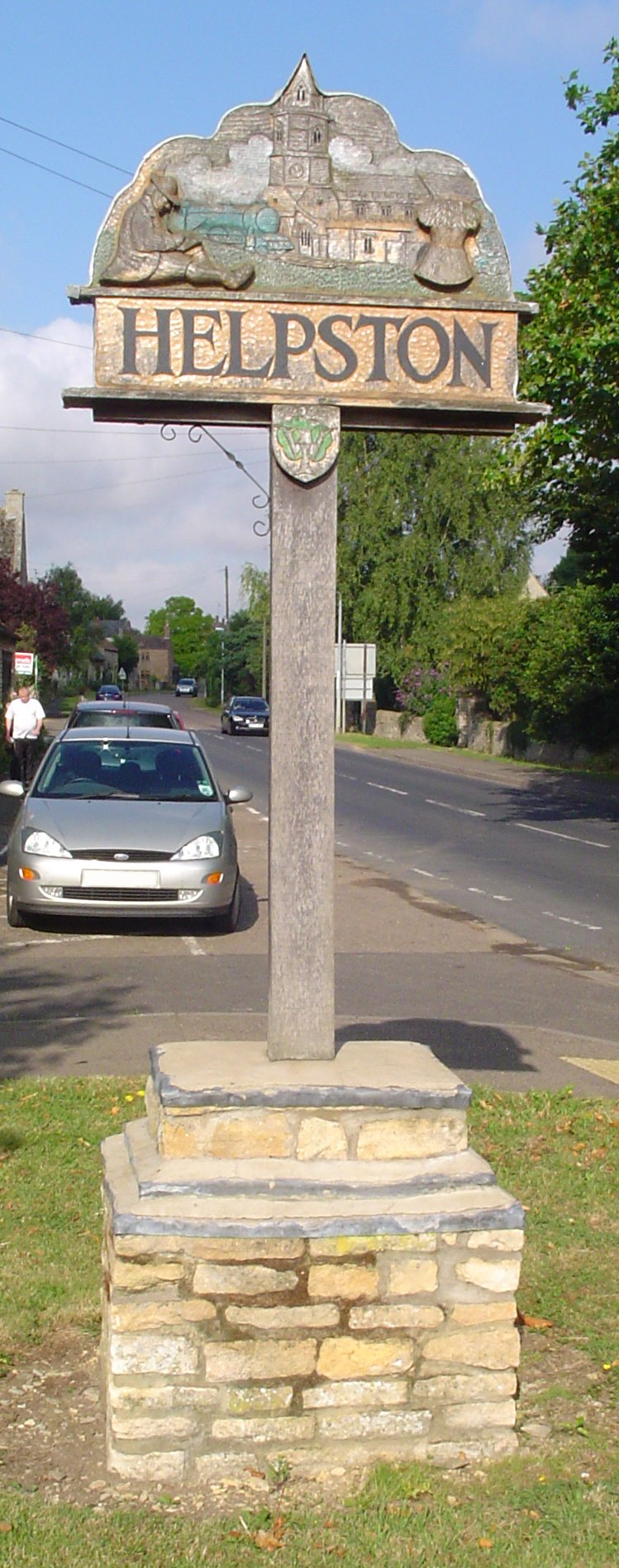
Village sign

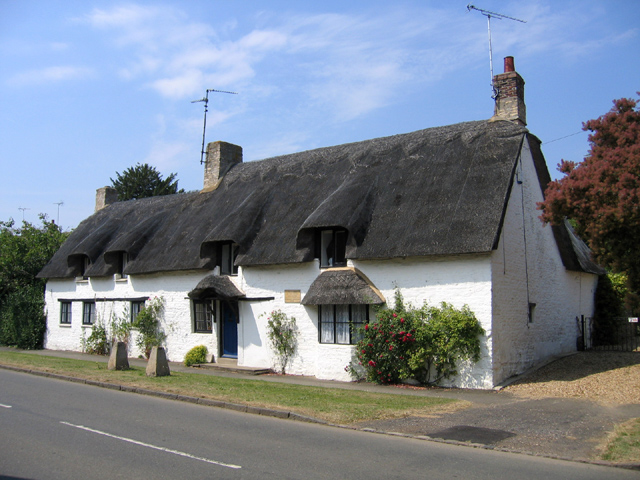
John Clare Cottage

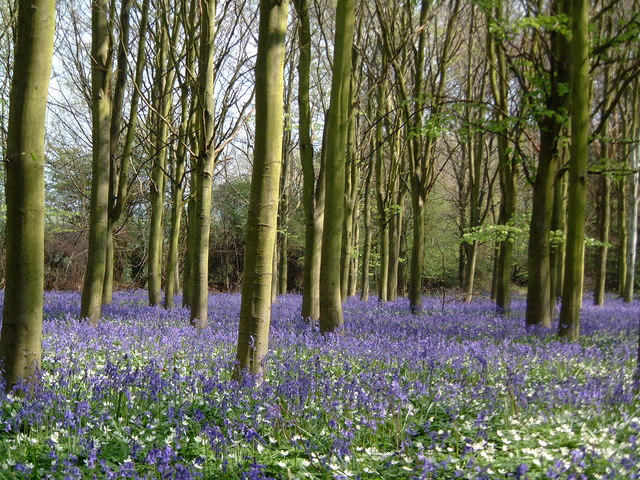
Bluebells at Helpston Heath

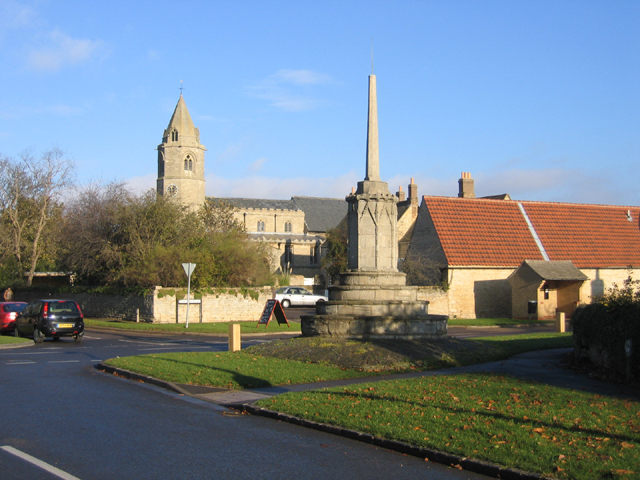
Butter Cross and parish church

== See also ==
- Helpston railway station
