= John Clare =

English poet (1793–1864)

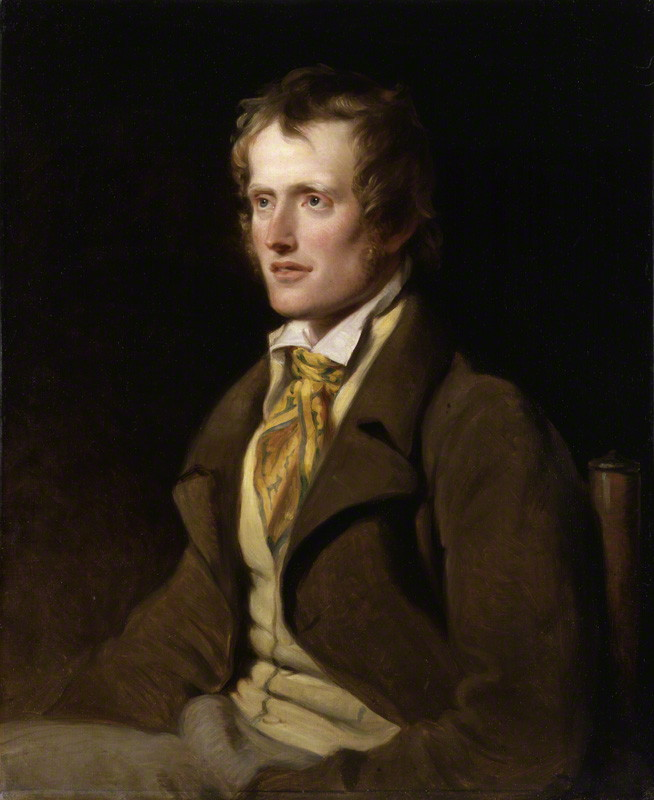
- John Clare by William Hilton, oil on canvas, 1820
- Born: 13 July 1793; Helpston, Northamptonshire, England
- Died: 20 May 1864 (aged 70); Northampton, Northamptonshire, England
- Writing career
- Genre: Rural
- Notable works: Poems Descriptive of Rural Life and Scenery

John Clare (13 July 1793 – 20 May 1864) was an English poet. The son of a farm labourer, he became known for his celebrations of the English countryside and his sorrows at its disruption. His work underwent major re-evaluation in the late 20th century; he is now often seen as a major 19th-century poet. His biographer Jonathan Bate called Clare "the greatest labouring-class poet that England has ever produced. No one has ever written more powerfully of nature, of a rural childhood, and of the alienated and unstable self."

== Life ==
=== Early life ===
Clare was born on 13 July 1793 in the village of Helpston in Northamptonshire. (Note: In his lifetime, the village was in the Soke of Peterborough in Northamptonshire and his memorial calls him "The Northamptonshire Peasant Poet". Helpston has been in Cambridgeshire since county boundary changes in 1974.) His parents, who married in December 1792, were Ann Stimson, daughter of a shepherd in the nearby village of Castor, and agricultural worker Parker Clare, the illegitimate son of Alice Clare and John Donald Parker, an itinerant Scottish schoolmaster who left the village before his son was born. Clare was one of twins; his twin sister Bessy, although the stronger baby, died a few weeks after birth. Clare was followed by sisters Elizabeth, who was born in 1796 and died in childhood, and Sophia, who was born in 1798.

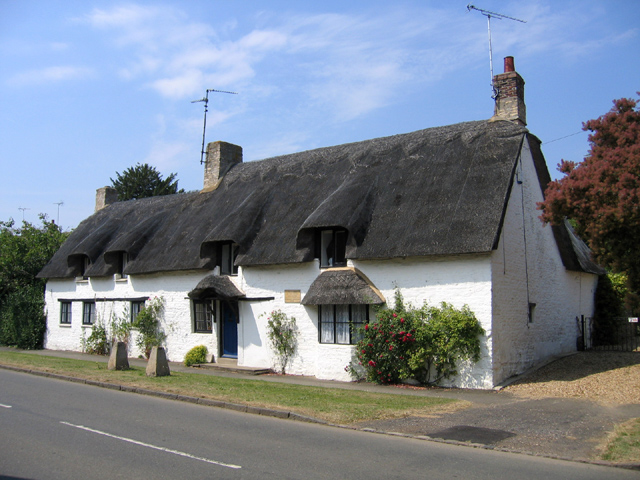
Clare's birthplace, Helpston. The cottage was subdivided with his family renting a part.

Clare left an account of his childhood and youth in unpublished autobiographical notes written in the 1820s. Always small for his age, he grew up in poverty in a small cottage in the village. His father could read a little but not write, while his mother could neither read nor write. They wanted their son to get an education, and, between the ages of five and seven, Clare attended the local dame school. From the age of eight, he attended the vestry school in Glinton church, while also helping in the fields and threshing barn. He acquired a love of learning and also of nature, spending Sundays wandering the fields and woods. While at school, he developed a friendship with Mary Joyce, a farmer's daughter, and gradually fell in love with her. The friendship lasted into adulthood, but Clare's hopes of marriage were disappointed. His unrequited love for Mary Joyce remained an important influence on his life and poetry. Clare left school aged twelve and his parents made a number of unsuccessful attempts to find a position for him. He rejected apprenticeships with a shoemaker and a stonemason, preferring to stay at home and work in the fields. He was offered work as a ploughboy at Woodcroft Castle but left after a few weeks. There was an unsuccessful interview for the position of a lawyer's clerk in Wisbech before he obtained work for a year as a potboy in the Bluebell Inn in Helpston.

Clare then was apprenticed to the kitchen gardener at Burghley House, but left before the end of the first year of his three-year apprenticeship. In 1811 he enlisted in the Northamptonshire Militia. By 1814, he was back in Helpston, living with his parents and working in fields and gardens. He went out drinking, spent Sundays and evenings with Gypsies camped on Helpston Heath, and for a time courted a wheelwright's daughter. In 1817, he found work as a lime burner in Pickworth, Rutland, and it was there that he began a courtship with Martha Turner, known as Patty, (Note: In the diminutive form of women's names beginning with M, the M is sometimes replaced by P, as in Margaret-Peggie, Mary-Polly) the eighteen-year-old daughter of a cottage farmer. Turner became pregnant, and the couple were married in the Church of St Peter and St Paul in Great Casterton on 16 March 1820, two months after the publication of Clare's first collection of poems.

=== Success as a poet ===
As a child, Clare had read chapbooks and broadsides as well as the Bible and Prayer Book. Aged thirteen, he acquired a copy of James Thomson's The Seasons and was inspired to start writing his own poetry. In 1817, Clare entered into an agreement with Market Deeping bookseller and printer J.B. Henson to publish a collection of his poems by subscription, but the plan came to nothing as Henson demanded increasing sums of Clare to cover the cost of printing. A Stamford bookseller, Edward Drury, then met with Clare and sent his poems to his cousin, John Taylor of the Taylor & Hessey firm in London, which had published the work of John Keats, William Hazlitt, Charles Lamb, Thomas de Quincey, Henry Francis Cary and others. Taylor recognised the value of Clare's poetry and agreed to publish them, edited for grammar and with a glossary of the dialect words used by the author. In December 1819, Drury paid the rent arrears of Clare's parents, saving them from eviction from the cottage they shared with Clare. In January 1820, Poems Descriptive of Rural Life and Scenery by John Clare A Northamptonshire Peasant was published.

Clare's first published volume of poetry was an immediate success. It received favourable reviews and sold well, running to four editions within a year. The New Monthly Magazine praised the poet's observation of nature and use of dialect; The Eclectic Review hailed him as a genius; the Anti-Jacobin Review described his as the new Robert Burns. "The Meeting", a poem from the collection, was put to music by Haydn Corri (a son of Domenico Corri) and sung by Lucia Elizabeth Vestris at Drury Lane. As Clare's fame spread, he was visited in Helpston by admirers. In February 1820, he was invited to Milton Hall, where Lady Fitzwilliam gave him £17. Next he was invited to Burghley House, where the Marquis of Exeter bestowed an annuity of 15 guineas upon him.

John Taylor, Clare's publisher, invited him to London, where he had his portrait painted by William Hilton and was introduced to future patrons Baron Radstock and Eliza Emmerson. After a week in London, Clare returned to Helpston and, on 16 March 1820, married Patty Turner, who signed the register with a cross. Among visitors to Helpston was Chauncy Hare Townshend, a student at the University of Cambridge who became a correspondent and friend of Clare. As Clare embarked on married life, his supporters set about finding money that would provide him with a settled income. Earl Spencer provided an annuity of £10, while Baron Radstock raised a subscription, which, together with the annuities from the Marquis of Exeter and Earl Spencer, was intended to give Clare an annual income of £43.

=== Decline ===
Clare's second volume of poetry, The Village Minstrel, was published in September 1821 but did not sell so well as the first. In 1822 he visited London for three weeks and met with literary figures including Hazlitt, Lamb and de Quincy. Back in Helpston, he became prone to fits of depression as he faced the need to provide for a growing family and the loneliness of living in a village where there were few people with whom he could share his literary interests. John Taylor invited him to London in 1824 and arranged for him to be treated by George Darling, a Scottish physician, who recommended rest and advised him to return to working in the fields, only write in his leisure time, and give up drinking. Clare followed the medical advice but his health declined over the following years. A third volume of poetry, The Shepherd's Calendar was published in 1827 but sold badly. The profits from his books and interest on the money previously collected for him were not enough to lift him out of poverty. In 1828, he spent a few weeks in London, staying with the Emmersons and sitting for a bronze bust by the sculptor Henry Behnes.

In 1832 Clare's friends, who included Earl Fitzwilliam's house steward and geologist Edmund Tyrell Artis and gardener Joseph Henderson, arranged for Clare to move his family into a larger cottage with two acres of land belonging to the Earl in the village of Northborough, not far from Helpston. His wealthy friends gave him money to set up as a small farmer, but it was not a successful venture and he felt more alienated there than he had done in Helpston. Clare continued to write and his fourth and final volume of verse was published in 1835. Originally titled The Midsummer Cushion, the volume was heavily edited by Eliza Emmerson, who removed half the poems and chose the new title of The Rural Muse. The book received favourable reviews, including one by Christopher North in Blackwood's Edinburgh Magazine. North considered it Clare's best work and had especial praise for the sonnets and bird poems. He thought the book was worth far more than its price and reminded readers that buying it would help lift the author and his family out of poverty. The book however did not sell well, and Clare despaired of being able to support his wife and seven children. In December 1835 his mother died and his ailing father joined the household. As Clare's health declined and his behaviour became at times strange, his friends began to discuss his admission to an asylum.

=== The asylum years ===
In July 1837, on the recommendation of his publishing friend, John Taylor, Clare went of his own volition (accompanied by a friend of Taylor's) to Dr Matthew Allen's private asylum High Beach near Loughton, in Epping Forest. Taylor had assured Clare that he would receive the best medical care.

Clare was reported as being "full of many strange delusions". He believed himself to be a prize fighter and that he had two wives, Patty and Mary. He started to claim he was Lord Byron. Allen wrote about Clare to The Times in 1840:

It is most singular that ever since he came... the moment he gets pen or pencil in hand he begins to write most poetical effusions. Yet he has never been able to obtain in conversation, nor even in writing prose, the appearance of sanity for two minutes or two lines together, and yet there is no indication of insanity in any of his poetry.

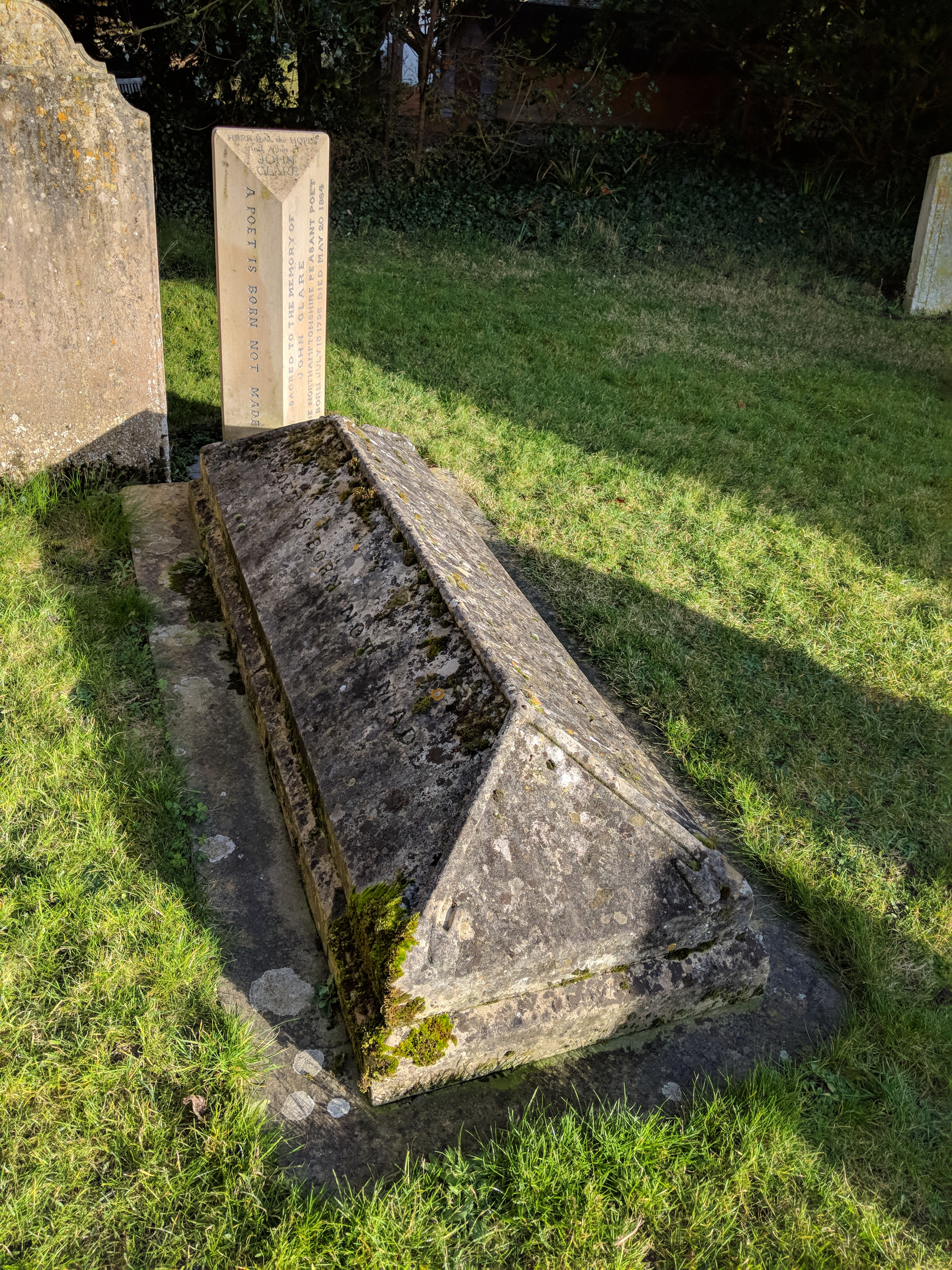
Clare's grave in Helpston churchyard

During his early asylum years in High Beach, Essex (1837–1841), Clare re-wrote poems and sonnets by Lord Byron. Child Harold, his version of Byron's Childe Harold's Pilgrimage, became a lament for past lost love, and Don Juan, A Poem, an acerbic, misogynistic, sexualised rant redolent of an ageing dandy. Clare also took credit for Shakespeare's plays, claiming to be him. "I'm John Clare now," the poet told a newspaper editor, "I was Byron and Shakespeare formerly."

In July 1841, Clare absconded from the asylum in Essex and walked some 80 miles (130 km) home, believing he was to meet his first love Mary Joyce, to whom he was convinced he was married. He did not believe her family when they told him she had died accidentally three years earlier in a house fire. He remained free, mostly at home in Northborough, for the five months following, but eventually Patty called the doctors.

Between Christmas and New Year, 1841, Clare was committed to Northampton General Lunatic Asylum (now St Andrew's Hospital). On his arrival at the asylum, the accompanying doctor, Fenwick Skrimshire, having treated Clare since 1820, completed the admission papers. Asked, "Was the insanity preceded by any severe or long-continued mental emotion or exertion?" Skrimshire entered: "After years of poetical prosing."

His maintenance at the asylum was paid for by Earl Fitzwilliam, "but at the ordinary rate for poor people". He remained there for the rest of his life under the humane regime of Thomas Octavius Prichard, who encouraged and helped him to write. Here he wrote possibly his most famous poem, "I Am". It was in this later poetry that Clare "developed a very distinctive voice, an unmistakable intensity and vibrance, such as the later pictures of Van Gogh" possessed.

John Clare died of a stroke on 20 May 1864, in his 71st year. His remains were returned to Helpston for burial in St Botolph's churchyard, where he had expressed a wish to be buried.

== Poetry ==
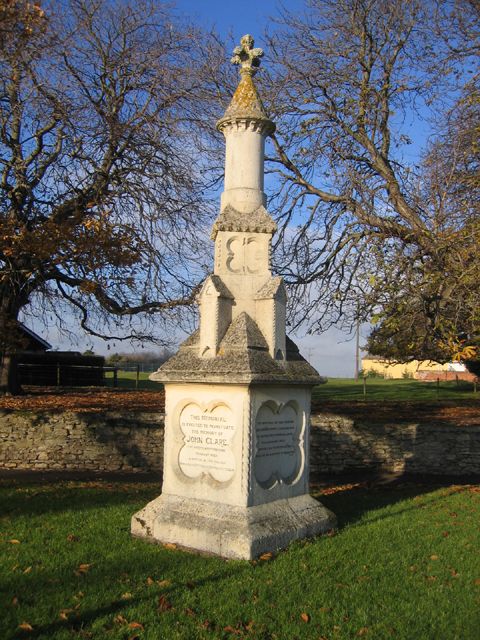
John Clare memorial, Helpston

In his time, Clare was commonly known as "the Northamptonshire Peasant Poet". His formal education was brief, his other employment and class origins lowly. Clare resisted the use of the increasingly standardised English grammar and orthography in his poetry and prose, alluding to political reasoning in comparing "grammar" (in a wider sense of orthography) to tyrannical government and slavery, personifying it in jocular fashion as a "bitch". He wrote in Northamptonshire dialect, introducing local words to the literary canon such as "pooty" (snail), "lady-cow" (ladybird), "crizzle" (to crisp) and "throstle" (song thrush).

In early life, he struggled to find a place for his poetry in the changing literary fashions of the day. He also felt that he did not belong with other peasants. As Clare once wrote:

"I live here among the ignorant like a lost man in fact like one whom the rest seemes careless of having anything to do with—they hardly dare talk in my company for fear I should mention them in my writings and I find more pleasure in wandering the fields than in musing among my silent neighbours who are insensible to everything but toiling and talking of it and that to no purpose."

It is common to see an absence of punctuation in Clare's original writings, although many publishers felt the need to remedy this in most of his work. Clare argued with his editors about how it should be presented to the public.

Clare grew up in a time of massive changes in town and countryside as the Industrial Revolution swept Europe. Many former agricultural and craft workers, including children, moved from the countryside to crowded cities, as factory work mechanized. The Agricultural Revolution saw pastures ploughed up, trees and hedges uprooted, fens drained and commons enclosed. This destruction of an ancient way of life distressed Clare. His political and social views were mainly conservative. ("I am as far as my politics reaches 'King and Country' – no Innovations in Religion and Government say I.") He refused even to complain of the subordinate position to which English society had placed him, swearing that "with the old dish that was served to my forefathers I am content."

His early work expresses delight in nature and the cycle of the rural year. Poems such as "Winter Evening", "Haymaking" and "Wood Pictures in Summer" mark the beauty of the world and the certainties of rural life, where animals must be fed and crops harvested. Poems such as "Little Trotty Wagtail" show his sharp observation of wildlife, though "The Badger" shows a lack of sentiment about the place of animals in the countryside. At this time he often used poetic forms such as the sonnet and the rhyming couplet. His later poetry tends to be more meditative and use forms similar to the folk songs and ballads of his youth. An example of this is "Evening".

Clare's knowledge of the natural world went far beyond that of the major Romantic poets. However, poems such as "I Am" show a metaphysical depth parallel with his contemporary poets and many of his pre-asylum poems deal with intricate play on the nature of linguistics. His "bird's nest poems", it can be argued, display the self-awareness and obsession with the creative process that captivated the romantics. Clare was the most influential poet, apart from Wordsworth, to prefer an older style.

In a foreword to the 2011 anthology The Poetry of Birds, the broadcaster and bird-watcher Tim Dee notes that Clare wrote about 147 species of British wild birds "without any technical kit whatsoever".

=== Religion ===
Clare was an Anglican. Whatever he may have felt about liturgy and ministry, and however critical an eye he may have cast on parish life, Clare retained and replicated his father's loyalty to the Church of England. He dodged services in his youth and dawdled in the fields during the hours of worship, but he derived much help in later years from members of the clergy. He acknowledged that his father "was brought up in the communion of the Church of England, and I have found no cause to withdraw myself from it." If he found aspects of the established church uncongenial and awkward, he remained prepared to defend it: "Still I reverence the church and do from my soul as much as anyone curse the hand that's lifted to undermine its constitution."

Much of Clare's imagery was drawn from the Old Testament (e.g. "The Peasant Poet"). However, Clare also honours the figure of Christ in poems such as "The Stranger".

== Essays ==
The only Clare essay to appear in his lifetime was "Popularity of Authorship", which described anonymously his predicament in 1824. Other essays by Clare to appear posthumously were "Essays on Landscape", "Essays on Criticism and Fashion", "Recollections on a Journey from Essex", "Excursions with an Angler", "For Essay on Modesty and Mock Morals", "For Essay on Industry", "Keats", "Byron", "The Dream", "House or Window Flies" and "Dewdrops".

== Legacy ==
Clare was relatively forgotten in the later 19th century, but interest in his work was revived by Arthur Symons in 1908, Edmund Blunden in 1920 and John and Anne Tibble in their ground-breaking 1935 two-volume edition, while in 1949 Geoffrey Grigson edited Poems of John Clare's Madness (published by Routledge and Kegan Paul). Benjamin Britten set some of "May" from A Shepherd's Calendar in his Spring Symphony of 1948 and included a setting of The Evening Primrose in his Five Flower Songs.

Copyright on much of his work was claimed after 1965 by Professor Eric Robinson, the editor of the Complete Poetry, but this has been contested. Some publishers such as Faber and Carcanet Press refused to acknowledge it. Robinson died in 2019 and neither his widow nor his literary agent maintain his claim to own the copyright.

The largest collection of original Clare manuscripts is held at Peterborough Museum and Art Gallery, where items are available to view by appointment. Other Clare papers are in public libraries in Northampton and New York.

Altering what Clare actually wrote continued into the later 20th century. Helen Gardner, for instance, amended both the punctuation and the spelling and grammar when editing the New Oxford Book of English Verse 1250–1950 (1972).

The John Clare Society was formed in the UK in 1981 and had around 550 members as of 2026. The society, which is a registered charity, holds an annual festival in Helpston in July. The John Clare Society of North America has, since 1993, organised an annual session of scholarly papers concerning John Clare at the Convention of the Modern Language Association of America.

On Clare's birthday, children at the John Clare School, Helpston's primary, parade through the village and place their "midsummer cushions" around his gravestone, which bears the inscriptions "To the Memory of John Clare The Northamptonshire Peasant Poet" and "A Poet is Born not Made".

== John Clare Cottage ==
The thatched cottage where Clare was born was bought by the John Clare Trust in 2005. In May 2007, the Trust gained £1.27 million of funding from the Heritage Lottery Fund and commissioned Jefferson Sheard Architects to create a new landscape design and visitor centre, including a cafe, shop and exhibition area. The cottage at 12 Woodgate, Helpston, has been restored using traditional building methods and is open to the public. In 2013, the John Clare Trust received a further grant from the Heritage Lottery Fund to help preserve the building and provide educational activities for youngsters visiting it.

== Works ==
- Autumn
- First Love
- Nightwind
- Snow Storm.
- The Firetail.
- The Badger – Date unknown
- The Lament of Swordy Well
- Sunday Dip.
- The Skylark.

=== Poetry collections ===
In chronological order:

- Poems Descriptive of Rural Life and Scenery. London, 1820
- The Village Minstrel, and Other Poems. London, 1821
- The Shepherd's Calendar with Village Stories and Other Poems. London, 1827
- The Rural Muse. London, 1835
- Sonnet. London 1841
- Poems by John Clare. Arthur Symons (Ed.) London, 1908
- The Poems of John Clare - In two volumes. London, 1935
- Selected Poems London, 1997

== Works about Clare ==
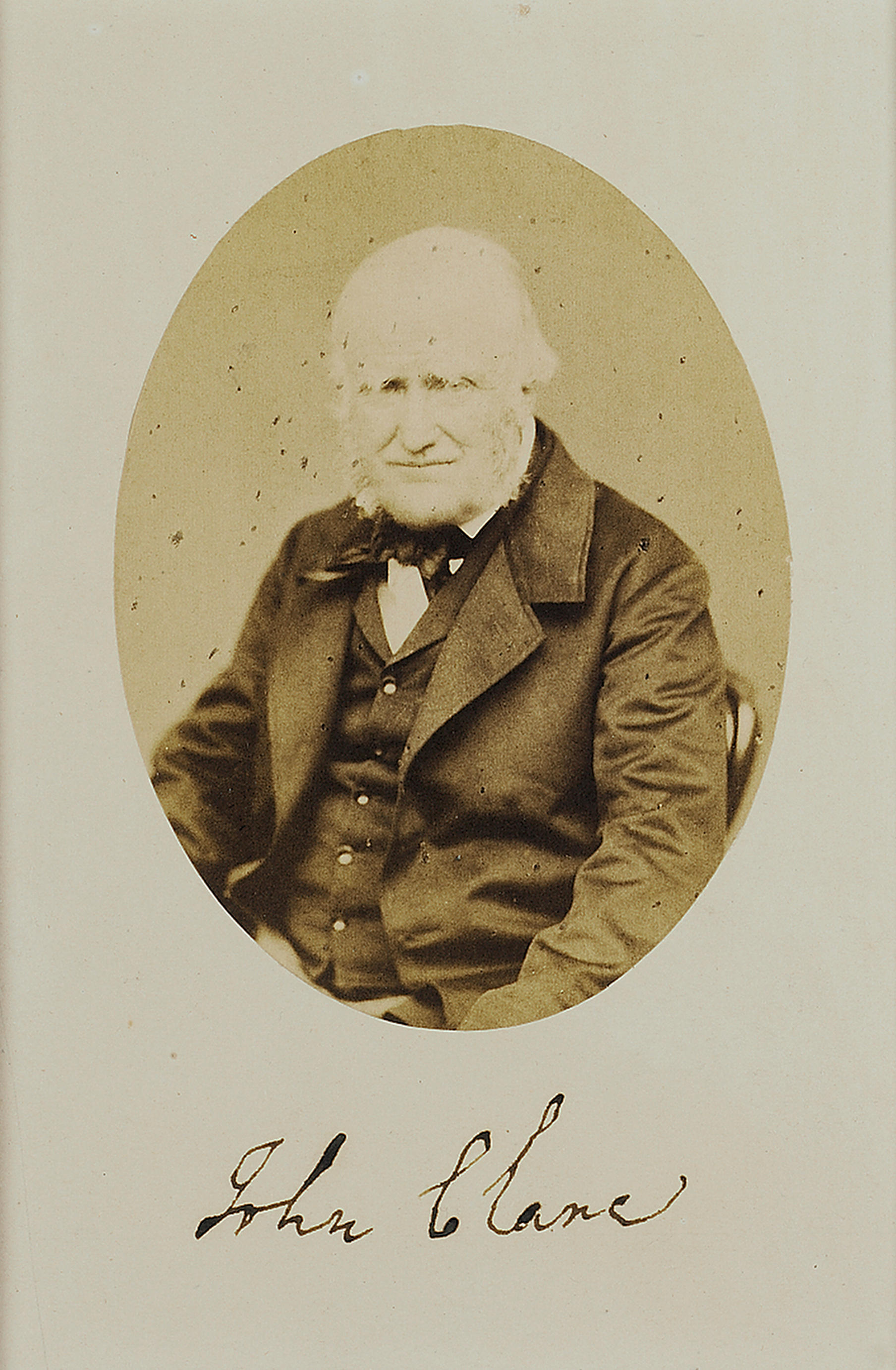
The only known photograph of Clare, 1862

In chronological order:

- Frederick Martin, The Life of John Clare, 1865
- J. L. Cherry, Life and Remains of John Clare, 1873
- Heath, Richard (1893). "John Clare" . The English Peasant. London: T. Fisher Unwin. pp. 292–319.
- Norman Gale, Clare's Poems, 1901
- J. W. and Anne Tibble, John Clare – A Life, Oxford University Press, 1932.
- June Wilson, Green Shadows: The Life of John Clare, 1951
- John Barrell, The Idea of Landscape and the Sense of Place, 1730–1840: An Approach to the Poetry of John Clare, Cambridge University Press, 1972
- Edward Bond, The Fool, 1975
- Greg Crossan, A Relish for Eternity: The Process of Divinization in the Poetry of John Clare, 1976, ISBN 978-0773406162
- H. O. Dendurent, John Clare: A Reference Guide, Boston: G. K. Hall, 1978
- Edward Storey, A Right to Song: The Life of John Clare, London: Methuen, 1982, ISBN 0-413-39940-0
- Timothy Brownlow, John Clare and Picturesque Landscape, 1983
- John MacKenna, Clare: a novel, Belfast: The Blackstaff Press, 1993, ISBN 0-85640-467-5 (fictional biography)
- Hugh Haughton, Adam Phillips and Geoffrey Summerfield, John Clare in Context, Cambridge University Press, 1994, ISBN 0-521-44547-7
- Alan Moore, Voice of the Fire (Chapter 10 only), UK: Victor Gollancz
- John Goodridge and Simon Kovesi (eds), John Clare: New Approaches, John Clare Society, 2000
- Arnold Clay, Itching After Rhyme: A Life of John Clare, Parapress Ltd., 2000
- Jonathan Bate, John Clare, London: Picador, 2003
- Alan B. Vardy, John Clare, Politics and Poetry, London: Palgrave MacMillan, 2003
- Iain Sinclair, Edge of The Orison: In the Traces of John Clare's "Journey Out of Essex", Hamish Hamilton, 2005
- John MacKay, Inscription and Modernity: From Wordsworth to Mandelstam, Bloomington: Indiana University Press, 2006, ISBN 0-253-34749-1.
- David Powell, First Publications of John Clare's Poems, John Clare Society of North America, 2009
- Carry Akroyd, "Natures Powers & Spells": Landscape Change, John Clare and Me, Langford Press, 2009, ISBN 978-1-904078-35-7
- Judith Allnatt, The Poet's Wife, Doubleday, 2010 (fiction), ISBN 0-385-61332-6
- Adam Foulds, The Quickening Maze, Jonathan Cape, 2009
- D. C. Moore, Town (Play)
- Sarah Houghton-Walker, John Clare's Religion, Routledge, 2016, ISBN 978-0-754665-14-4
- Adam White, John Clare's Romanticism, London: Palgrave Macmillan, 2017
- Simon Kövesi, John Clare: Nature, Criticism and History, London: Palgrave, 2017, ISBN 978-0-230-27787-8

== John Clare and music ==
Clare's father was, according to Clare, a 'noted singer', and Clare himself played the fiddle and collected folk songs and tunes. Regarding his fiddle-playing ability, he described himself as "a decent scraper", and collected over two hundred folk tunes in two books, the Northampton Manuscripts Nos. 12 and 13.

As well as collecting folk tunes, Clare also collected many folk songs which are recorded in the Northampton Manuscript No. 18, and the Peterborough Manuscripts B4 and B7. According to George Deacon, the Northampton Manuscript No. 18 contains "more polished and refined versions" of songs which were originally written up in a rougher form in the two Peterborough Manuscripts, B4 and B7. Deacon's research led him to view the two Peterborough manuscripts as more authentic, inasmuch as they showed, "less conscious interference from the poet in Clare" than the versions of the songs in the Northampton manuscript.

Since Clare's death, many of his poems have been set to music by classical composers, and, more recently, by contemporary singer/songwriters working in the acoustic and folk genres. However, at least one of Clare's poems was set to music in his lifetime, although Clare arrived in London too late to attend the performance. According to Professor Simon Kövesi, "The Meeting ... [was] Clare's first poem to be set to music and performed on stage. The performance by singer Madame Vestris was at Drury Lane Theatre on 19 February 1820; the song was threaded into the pasticcio opera The Siege of Belgrade. Clare just missed the show, arriving in London for his first visit to the capital a short while after. Clare wrote that 'on the night we got into London it was announcd [sic] in the Play Bills that a song of mine was to be sung at Covent Garden by Madam Vestris and we was to have gone but it was too late. I felt uncommonly pleasd [sic] at the circumstance'."

=== Songs and tunes collected by Clare in the Northampton Catalogue ===
The Catalogue of the John Clare Collection in the Northampton Public Library with Indexes to the Poems in Manuscript was compiled by David Powell and published by the County Borough of Northampton, Public Libraries, Museums and Art Gallery Committee in 1964. Included in the catalogue are the two books of folk tunes (MSS 12 & 13) and the book of folk songs (MSS 18).

==== John Clare, Northampton Manuscript No. 12 ====
Catalogue entry reads:

"A small oblong music book of song and dance tunes, inscribed on p.1 'John Clare / Helpstone / 1818' and entitled on p.3 A Collection / of Songs / Airs and Dances / For the Violin.

3¾" × 6¼", 82 pp., red quarter-leather with marbled boards.

Contents consist of eighty-eight titles, but the tunes are without words and directions. The titles are noted down in Clare's hand. This is No. 109 in the Peterborough Centenary Catalogue."

==== John Clare, Northampton Manuscript No. 13 ====
Catalogue entry reads:

"An oblong music book of song and dance tunes. Undated.

5¾″ × 9½″, 56 pp., blue paper covers.

Contents consist of 180 titles. Directions for some of the country dances are given in abbreviated form, but the only words given are those for Black Ey'd Susan and Dibdin's The Sailors Journal. The titles are noted down in Clare's hand. A few fragmentary lines of verse are scribbled inside the back cover. This is No. 108 in the Peterborough Centenary Catalogue."

==== John Clare, Northampton Manuscript No. 18 ====
Catalogue entry reads:

"A small oblong notebook, entitled Old Songs & Ballads, which Clare was using in 1827–8.

4″ × 6¼″, 34 pp. (+146 blank), worn brown half-calf with marbled boards.

The introduction begins: 'I commenced sometime ago with an intention of making a collection of old Ballads...', and contents include John Randall, The Maidens Welcome, The False Knights Tradegy, Loves Riddles, Banks of Ivory, etc. There is an additional poem, Round Oak, in pencil and several of the blank pages at the end contain traces of pencil writing which has been erased. This is No. 98 in the Peterborough Centenary Catalogue."

=== Recordings of songs and tunes collected by Clare ===
in chronological order:

- George Deacon, Dream Not of Love: 17 Songs from John Clare, album, 2002
- Decent Scrapers, The John Clare Project: music from the John Clare manuscripts, album, 2015
- Becky Dellow plays numerous tunes collected by Clare in: Becky Dellow & Adam Horovitz, The Thunder Mutters, podcast (episodes 1, 3, 5, 7, 9–13, 15–17), 2020–2021

=== Musical settings of Clare's poems ===
in chronological order:

- Benjamin Britten, "The Evening Primrose", song, from Five Flower Songs, choral composition for SATB, 1950
- Malcolm Arnold, John Clare Cantata, for SATB and piano duet, 1955
- Lois Rhea, Little Trotty Wagtail for SSA voices, 1955
- Trevor Hold, Three Songs of the Countryside, for two equal voices and piano to poems by "BB", John Clare and the composer, 1962
- Trevor Hold, For John Clare, for tenor and instrumental ensemble, 1964
- Richard Rodney Bennett, "The Insect World" & "Clock-a-clay", from The Insect World, song cycle for unison voices and piano, 1966
- Richard Rodney Bennett, "The Bird's Lament" & "The Early Nightingale", from The Aviary, song cycle for unison voices and piano, 1966
- Trevor Hold, Gathered from the Field, Seven songs for tenor and piano to poems by John Clare, 1975
- Michael Hurd, The Shepherd's Calendar, choral symphony for baritone solo, SATB chorus and orchestra, 1975
- Terence Greaves, Three Rustic Poems Of John Clare, for soprano voice and clarinet in A, 1976
- Royston Wood & Heather Wood, "The Cellar Door", song, from the album No Relation, 1977
- Kevin Coyne, "I am", song, from the album Dynamite Daze, 1978
- Trevor Hold, A John Clare Songbook, Nine songs for high voice and piano to poems by John Clare, 1980
- Judith Bingham, "A Winter Scene" from A Cold Spell – 5 Carols for Winter, for SSAATTBB unaccompanied choir, 1987
- Vikki Clayton, Midsummer Cushion, album (tracks 1–3, 5–9), 1991
- Trevor Hold, A Little Songbook for John Clare. Five songs for soprano and piano to poems by John Clare, 1993
- Gordon Tyrrall, A Distance from the Town: A musical appreciation of the work of the poet John Clare, album (tracks 1, 3–4, 6–7, 9–10, 12–13, 17, 19–20), 1998
- John Wright, "Song (Heaven to Be Near Thee)", song, from the album A Few Short Lines, 1999
- Terence Deadman, Eight Song Settings from the Poems of John Clare, compositions for tenor and piano, 2005
- Steeleye Span, "Ned Ludd Part 1 (Inclosure)", song, from the album Bloody Men, 2006
- Chris Wood, "I Am", song, from the album None the Wiser, 2013
- Andy Turner, "The Crow Sat on the Willow", song, 2018
- Andy Turner, "The Gipsey's Song", song, 2019
- Robert Farmer, John Clare – Songs from the Shepherd's Calendar, album, 2021
- Manish Lamport, "No.1, A Vision", song, from 3 Songs, Op. 16, for soprano and orchestra, 2024
- Manish Lamport, "II - 'Mouse's Nest'", song, from Songs of Impression, Op. 22, for soprano, tenor, chorus and orchestra, 2026

=== Songs about, inspired by, or containing references to Clare ===
in chronological order:

- Chris Wood, "Mad John", song, from the album Trespasser, 2008
- Pennyless, "John Clare", song, from the album Strange Dreams, 2019

=== More information about Clare and music ===
in chronological order:

- George Deacon, John Clare and the Folk Tradition, Sinclair Browne Ltd, 1983
- BBC Radio 4, John Clare's Playlist, 2013
- Derek B. Scott, John Clare and Folksong, 2015
- Tony Urbainczyk & Rose Urbainczyk, John Clare – poet and fiddler, 1793–1864, 2015
- BBC Radio 4, John Clare's Scraping, 2020
- Becky Dellow & Adam Horovitz, The Thunder Mutters, podcast (episodes 1, 3, 5, 7, 9–13, 15–17), 2020–2021
- Simon Kövesi, Julian Philips, & Toby Jones, The Meeting: A panel discussion on John Clare, his poetry and music, 2021

== See also ==
- Chauncy Hare Townshend
- Political poetry
- Proletarian poetry
- Proletarian literature
