= John Scott Keltie =

British geographer (1840–1927)

Sir John Scott Keltie FRGS FSS
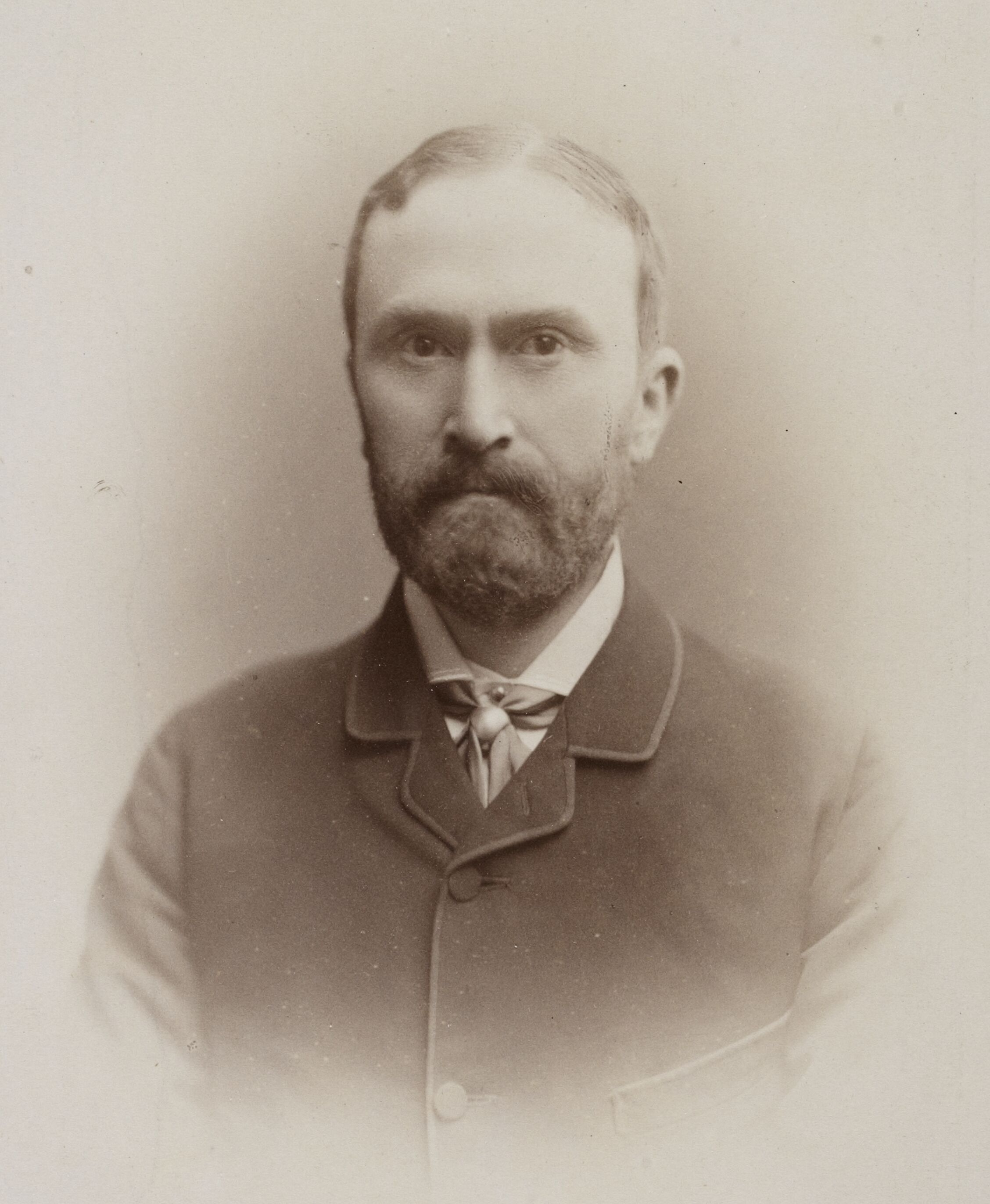
- Keltie in 1885
- Born: 29 March 1840; Dundee, Scotland
- Died: 12 January 1927 (aged 86); London, England
- Occupation: geographer
- Known for: work with the Royal Geographical Society
- Awards: Cullum Geographical Medal (1914); Victoria Medal (1917)

Sir John Scott Keltie FRGS FSS (29 March 1840 – 12 January 1927) was a Scottish geographer, best known for his work with the Royal Geographical Society.

== History ==
Keltie was born in Dundee and attended school in Perth. He matriculated at the University of St Andrews and the University of Edinburgh. He also completed a course of study at the Theological Hall of the United Presbyterian Church in Edinburgh, but did not go into a religious career.

Keltie later moved to London in 1871 to join Macmillan Publishers, where in 1873 he became sub-editor of the journal Nature and began separately to write articles on geography for The Times. In 1880, he was taken on as editor of The Statesman's Yearbook for Macmillan.

In 1883, Keltie joined the Royal Geographical Society and quickly became heavily involved in its activities. He was later appointed its Inspector of Geographical Education in 1884, and undertook a thorough review of the state of geography education in the UK, producing an influential 150-page report.

In 1885, he became the society's librarian, and upon the death of Henry Walter Bates in 1892, succeeded him as assistant secretary of the society (in effect its secretary, as the official secretary was a figurehead from the nobility). Among his first tasks was the relaunching of the Proceedings of the Royal Geographical Society as the Geographical Journal in 1893, in order to appeal to a wider audience. He was officially given the title of secretary in 1896.

Between 1914 and 1915, Keltie served as president of the Geographical Association, succeeded by the author Hilaire Belloc. Keltie retired as secretary of the society in 1915 and was succeeded by Arthur Robert Hinks, though he remained as joint editor (with Hinks) of the Geographical Journal until 1917. He died in London in 1927.

== Awards ==
Keltie received various awards during his long career. In 1917, he was presented the society's Victoria Medal. He also received the Cullum Geographical Medal of the American Geographical Society, and the gold medals of the Paris and Royal Scottish Geographical Societies.

In 1918, Keltie was made a Knight Bachelor.

== In popular culture ==
Keltie was portrayed by Robert James in the 1983 series Shackleton, by Richard Wilson in the 1985 serial The Last Place on Earth, by Ron Donachie in the 2002 miniseries Shackleton, and by Clive Francis in the 2016 film The Lost City of Z.
