= Department of English and Media, Birmingham City University =

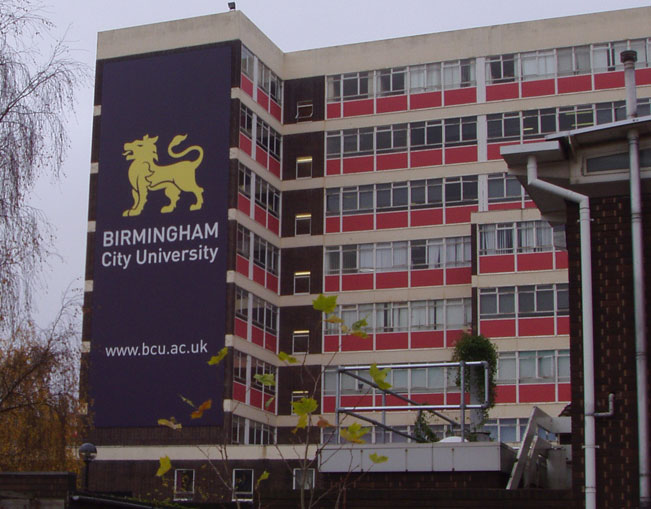
- Established: 1959
- Affiliations: Birmingham City University
- Head of School: Matthew Day
- Location: Birmingham, United Kingdom
- Campus: City Centre Campus
- Website: www.bcu.ac.uk/arts

The Department of English and Media is part of the School of Arts at Birmingham City University. The department offers a range of undergraduate and postgraduate courses, and is home to the Research and Development Unit for English Studies.

== History ==
The origins of the School of English can be traced back to the teaching of English Literature at the College of Commerce during the 1920s, which led to the creation of a Department of English & Secretarial Studies in the same college during the 1950s. In 1959, the department began offering the external University of London BA English degree. One of the graduates during this period was the celebrated novelist Jim Crace.

During the 1960s, the department became the Department of English & Foreign Languages in a Faculty of Arts & Social Sciences, and this became one of the constituent faculties when the City of Birmingham Polytechnic was formed in 1971.

During the 1980s, the department became the Department of English & Communication Studies in the Faculty of Health and Social Sciences. In 1985, the English degree was revised and renamed BA English Language & Literature. At the time, this was one of the few single honours courses that allowed students to combine literary and linguistic study.

When polytechnics were given university status in 1992, Birmingham Polytechnic became the University of Central England in Birmingham. English and Communication Studies went their separate ways, Communication Studies to Art & Design, and English (now the School of English) to the Faculty of Computing & Information Studies, which was eventually renamed the Faculty of Computing, Information & English (CIE).

In 2004, the School joined the Faculty of Law & Social Sciences. Following a faculty reorganisation in the renamed Birmingham City University in 2007, the School of English found itself in the Faculty of Performance, Media & English (PME), before joining the Arts, Design & Media faculty (ADM) in 2014. In 2019, the School of English and the School of Media were joined together to become the Birmingham Institute for Media and English (BIME). In 2023, BIME was renamed as the College of English and Media (CoEM) and renamed once again in 2025 as the Department of English and Media (DoEM), with film and photography provision being moved to the department. As of 2026, the department is part of the reformulated School of Arts (introduced in 2025).

== Courses ==
The school offers integrated BA degrees in English, with pathways in Literature, Creative Writing and Language Studies. The Creative Writing has seen the school's work showcased in venues such as Foyles Bookshop, the Royal Court Theatre, and the Royal Birmingham Conservatoire. The school is home to the Institute of Creative and Critical Writing, the activities of which both assist the University's creative writing courses, through its series of masterclasses and guest authors, and engage with the wider culture beyond the university, through its calendar of public events.

The school has made a return to every Research Assessment Exercise since 1996 and currently has a diverse group of scholars and writers in all its constituent fields, whether literature, linguistics, drama or creative writing. There have been funded research projects from the Arts and Humanities Research Council and Engineering and Physical Sciences Research Council, and the work of members of the School has publications in journals and publishing houses.

The school is home to the Research and Development Unit for English Studies (RDUES). Founded by Professor Antoinette Renouf and formerly at the Universities of Birmingham and Liverpool, RDUES carries out research in corpus linguistics and has developed the WebCorp Linguist's Search Engine. Alumni of the School include David Gilbery, CEO of the Bill Kenwright Group, and Shaherazad Umbreen, Director of Brand and Marketing for the National Trust.

== Notable alumni ==
- Catherine Tyldesley – actress
- Danielle Pinnock – actress
- Dhafer L'Abidine – actor
- John Taylor – actor
- Jonnie Irwin – writer and television presenter
- Laura Mvula – singer
- Lily Pebbles – You Tuber, and blogger
- Marverine Cole – television news anchor
- Nicola Coughlan – actress
- Rob Mallard – actor
- Rhydian Roberts – singer
- Frank Skinner – comedian
- Jim Crace – novelist
- Fiona Phillips – television presenter
