= List of Sites of Special Scientific Interest in Cambridgeshire =

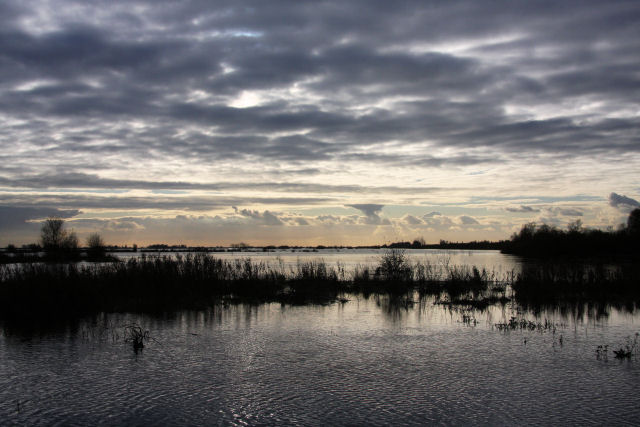
Ouse Washes at Welney

Cambridgeshire is a county in eastern England, with an area of 339,746 hectares (1,312 sq mi) and a population as of mid-2015 of 841,218. It is crossed by the Nene and the Great Ouse rivers. The University of Cambridge, which was founded in the thirteenth century, made the county one of the country's most important intellectual centres. A large part of the county is in The Fens, and drainage of this habitat, which probably commenced in the Roman period and was largely completed by the seventeenth century, considerably increased the area available for agriculture.

The administrative county was formed in 1974, incorporating most of the historic county of Huntingdonshire. Local government is divided between Cambridgeshire County Council and Peterborough City Council, which is a separate unitary authority. Under the county council, there are five district councils, Cambridge City Council, South Cambridgeshire District Council, East Cambridgeshire District Council, Huntingdonshire District Council and Fenland District Council.

In England, Sites of Special Scientific Interest (SSSIs) are designated by Natural England, which is responsible for protecting England's natural environment. Designation as an SSSI gives legal protection to the most important wildlife and geological sites. As of March 2017, there are 99 sites designated in the county. There are eighty-eight sites listed for their biological interest, ten for their geological interest, and one for both interests.

The largest site is Ouse Washes at 2,513.6 hectares (6,211 acres), which is partly in Norfolk. It is internationally important for its wintering and breeding waterfowl and waders, such as teal, pintail and wigeon. The smallest is Delph Bridge Drain at 0.1 hectares (0.25 acres), a short stretch of ditch which was designated because it was found to have a population of fen ragwort, which was believed to have been extinct in Britain since 1857. The only site designated for both biological and geological interests is Ely Pits and Meadows, which has nationally important numbers of bitterns, and has yielded sauropod dinosaurs and pliosaur marine reptiles dating to the Jurassic period.

== Key ==
=== Interest ===
- B = a site of biological interest
- G = a site of geological interest

=== Public access ===
- FP = access to footpaths through the site only
- NO = no public access to site
- PP = public access to part of site
- WTPR = Wildlife Trust permit required for access
- YES = public access to the whole or most of the site

=== Other classifications ===
- GCR = Geological Conservation Review
- LNR = Local nature reserve
- NCR = A Nature Conservation Review
- NNR = National nature reserve
- NT = National Trust
- Ramsar = Ramsar site, an internationally important wetland site
- RSPB = Royal Society for the Protection of Birds
- SAC = Special Area of Conservation
- SM = Scheduled monument
- SPA = Special Protection Area
- WT = Woodland Trust
- WTBCN = Wildlife Trust for Bedfordshire, Cambridgeshire and Northamptonshire
- WWT = Wildfowl & Wetlands Trust

== Sites ==
Site name	Photograph	B	G	Area	Public access	Location	Other classifications	Map (Note: The maps are provided by Natural England on the Magic Map website.)	Citation (Note: Citations are provided for each site by Natural England.)	Description
Adventurers' Land	Adventurers' Land		✓	10.1 hectares (25 acres)	YES	March; 52.598°N 0.008°E; TF361019	GCR	Map	Citation	The site is described by Natural England as important for the study of changes in Holocene sea levels. There are five peat levels dating to between 6,400 and 1,850 years BP, and the earliest level represents the oldest directly dated transgression of the sea into the Fens.
Alder Carr	Alder Carr	✓		6.7 hectares (17 acres)	NO	Hildersham; 52.117°N 0.251°E; TL542489		Map	Citation	The site is a wet valley which has alder on fen peat, a type of woodland which is now rare in East Anglia. Ground flora include angelica and meadowsweet. This habitat is very valuable to invertebrates.
Aversley Wood	Aversley Wood	✓		62.3 hectares (154 acres)	YES	Sawtry; 52.423°N 0.294°W; TL161819	WT	Map	Citation	This wood is ash and maple on heavy clay soils, with much of it dating to before the Middle Ages, and having diverse flora and fauna as a result. One area, which was probably cultivated until around 1350, has medieval ridge and furrow and lacks some plants found in areas which have been more continuously forested.
Balsham Wood	Balsham Wood	✓		35.0 hectares (86 acres)	NO	Balsham; 52.122°N 0.318°E; TL588496		Map	Citation	This site has one of the last surviving areas of ash and maple woodland on chalky boulder clay. It has diverse flora, including the rare oxlip and a variety of shrubs, such as dogwood. Open grassy rides provide additional habitats.
Barnack Hills & Holes	Barnack Hills & Holes	✓		23.5 hectares (58 acres)	YES	Barnack; 52.629°N 0.412°W; TF076046	NCR, NNR, SAC	Map	Citation	This site, on a former mineral working, is grassland on Jurassic limestone, and it is managed by sheep grazing and scrub control. It has a diverse flora including some species which are nationally scarce, such as pasque flowers.
Barrington Chalk Pit	Barrington Chalk Pit		✓	97.1 hectares (240 acres)	FP	Barrington; 52.142°N 0.033°E; TL392512	GCR	Map	Citation	This large quarry is the only surviving exposure of the Cretaceous Cambridge Greensand. Fossils include brachiopods and fish teeth. It is overlain by thick sequences of chalk and Totternhoe Stone.
Barrington Pit	Barrington Pit		✓	3.8 hectares (9.4 acres)	NO	Barrington; 52.123°N 0.019°E; TL383491	GCR	Map	Citation	This site is described by Natural England as of national importance for its mammal fossils. Species include hippopotamuses, straight-tusked elephants, lions and aurochs. They probably date to the warm Eemian period, around 130,000 to 115,000 years ago.
Bassenhally Pit	Bassenhally Pit	✓		8.6 hectares (21 acres)	NO	Whittlesey; 52.569°N 0.104°W; TL286985		Map	Citation	This former gravel quarry has diverse habitats, such as a pond, marshes, grassland, scrub and woodland. The marsh, where there are locally unusual vascular plants, is a nationally scarce habitat; flora include jointed rush, creeping bent, lesser water-plantain, early marsh-orchid and water violet.
Bedford Purlieus	Bedford Purlieus	✓		214.3 hectares (530 acres)	YES	Wansford; 52.583°N 0.465°W; TL041995	NCR, NNR	Map	Citation	This is ancient woodland with a variety of habitats of oak and ash coppices. It also has diverse flora including ramsons, lily-of-the-valleys, columbines, herb-paris and fly orchids.
Berry Fen	Berry Fen	✓		15.3 hectares (38 acres)	NO	Earith; 52.351°N 0.022°E; TL378745		Map	Citation	This neutral grassland periodically floods in the winter. It is used by wintering wildfowl, including Bewick's swans in nationally numbers, especially when the nearby Ouse Washes flood too deeply. There are wetland herbs such as marsh ragwort and the rare narrow-leaved water-dropwort.
Bonemills Hollow	:Bonemills Hollow	✓		17.5 hectares (43 acres)	NO	Wittering; 52.599°N 0.473°W; TF035012		Map	Citation	The valley has marsh and Jurassic calcareous grassland areas. The marshland is on the valley floor, and dominant species are lesser pond-sedge and the rushes jointed rush and hard rush.
Brackland Rough	Brackland Rough	✓		10.7 hectares (26 acres)	YES	Fordham; 52.302°N 0.394°E; TL633698	WTBCN	Map	Citation	This wet woodland site has semi-natural alder coppice, with ash, crack willow and silver birch. The ground flora has tall fens, together with herbs such as marsh marigold and yellow flag.
Brampton Meadow	Brampton Meadow	✓		1.0 hectare (2.5 acres)	NO	Brampton; 52.333°N 0.252°W; TL192720		Map	Citation	The site has a rich variety of plant species on calcareous clay pasture, a declining habitat. Plants include quaking-grass, adder's tongue fern, cowslip and green-winged orchid.
Brampton Racecourse	Brampton Racecourse	✓		21.1 hectares (52 acres)	NO	Brampton; 52.335°N 0.236°W; TL203722		Map	Citation	The site is species-rich neutral grassland, a rare habitat in the county, in the flood plain of Alconbury Brook. Plants include salad burnet, pepper-saxifrage, and the largest population of green-winged orchid in Cambridgeshire.
Brampton Wood	Brampton Wood	✓		132.1 hectares (326 acres)	YES	Brampton; 52.316°N 0.27°W; TL179701	WTBCN	Map	Citation	This is one of the few surviving areas of ancient woodland in the county. It is wet ash and maple on heavy clay soil, with rides which have a varied grassland flora, such as yellow pimpernel, greater bird's-foot-trefoil and devil's-bit scabious.
Buff Wood	Buff Wood	✓		15.8 hectares (39 acres)	WTPR	Hatley; 52.136°N 0.128°W; TL282503	WTBCN	Map	Citation	This site is ecologically diverse boulder clay woodland, with a range of wildflowers, including oxlips and the uncommon green hellebore. There are butterflies such as brimstones, large whites, orange-tips and speckled woods.
Caldecote Meadows	Caldecote Meadows	✓		9.1 hectares (22 acres)	NO	Caldecote; 52.201°N 0.029°W; TL348577		Map	Citation	The site is herb-rich calcareous grassland, which was formerly common in the county, but is now rare. It is traditionally managed by hay cutting and grazing, and plants include salad burnet and dropwort.
Cam Washes	Cam Washes	✓		166.5 hectares (411 acres)	YES	Wicken; 52.317°N 0.252°E; TL536712		Map	Citation	This site on the banks of the River Cam is composed of pastures which are seasonally flooded. It is described by Natural England as an important site for wintering and breeding wildfowl and waders. Breeding birds include snipe, redshank, gadwall, teal and shovelers.
Carlton Wood	Carlton Wood	✓		10.5 hectares (26 acres)	NO	Great Bradley; 52.15°N 0.416°E; TL654529		Map	Citation	According to Natural England, this wood has one of the finest stands of hornbeam in the county. Other trees are ash, field maple, hazel and pedunculate oak. There is a variety of flora typical of ancient woodlands such as oxlips and early-purple orchids.
Castor Flood Meadows	Castor Flood Meadows	✓		41.8 hectares (103 acres)	YES	Peterborough; 52.562°N 0.345°W; TL123972		Map	Citation	This site on the banks of the River Nene is a remnant of formerly extensive flood meadows. Flora include slender tufted-sedges, early marsh-orchids and the nationally restricted narrow-leaved water-dropwort.
Castor Hanglands	Castor Hanglands	✓		89.8 hectares (222 acres)	YES	Peterborough; 52.601°N 0.352°W; TF117016	NCR, NNR	Map	Citation	This site has ancient ash and maple woodland, unimproved grassland and scrub. The site is described by Natural England as valuable for invertebrates, including some nationally uncommon species. There are also ponds and ditches which have a variety of aquatic fauna including the warty newt.
Cherry Hinton Pit	Cherry Hinton Pit	✓		12.8 hectares (32 acres)	YES	Cambridge; 52.18°N 0.168°E; TL483557	LNR, WTBCN	Map	Citation	These former chalk quarries have a variety of habitats, including grassland and woodland. The site was designated an SSSI because it has four rare plants, three of which are listed in the British Red List of Threatened Species. These are great pignut, moon carrot and grape hyacinth.
Chettisham Meadow	Chettisham Meadow	✓		0.7 hectares (1.7 acres)	YES	Chettisham; 52.423°N 0.265°E; TL541830	WTBCN	Map	Citation	The site is grassland on calcareous clay, and evidence survives of ridge and furrow medieval farming. Flowering plants include adder's tongue, cowslip and the uncommon green-winged orchid.
Chippenham Fen and Snailwell Poor's Fen	Chippenham Fen	✓		155.6 hectares (384 acres)	NO	Fordham; 52.298°N 0.415°E; TL648694	NCR, NNR, Ramsar, SAC	Map	Citation	The site is described by Natural England as "of national importance for its wide range of wetland habitats and associated birds and insects". It has diverse habitats and flora, with several uncommon species in damp meadows. It also has many species of breeding birds, and rare spiders and moths.
Delph Bridge Drain	Delph Bridge Drain	✓		0.1 hectares (0.25 acres)	YES	Soham; 52.367°N 0.3°E; TL567768		Map	Citation	This site has the only known British population of fen ragwort, which was previously believed to have become extinct in the UK in 1857, due to habitat destruction. It was re-discovered in 1971 when dormant seeds probably germinated following excavation of the drain.
Dernford Fen	Dernford Fen	✓		10.3 hectares (25 acres)	NO	Sawston; 52.131°N 0.149°E; TL472503		Map	Citation	The site is a rare surviving example of rough fen and carr. Other habitats are dry grassland and scrub, together with ditches and a chalk stream. The diverse habitats are valuable for amphibians and reptiles.
Devil's Dyke	Devil's Dyke	✓		39.8 hectares (98 acres)	YES	Newmarket; 52.232°N 0.359°E; TL612619	SAC, SM	Map	Citation	It is not known when the dyke was built but a date in the Anglo-Saxon period is thought most likely. There is extensive chalk grassland with diverse species, and areas of woodland and chalk scrub. The site has unusual plants such as purple milk-vetch, bastard toadflax and pasque flowers.
Dogsthorpe Star Pit	Dogsthorpe Star Pit	✓		36.4 hectares (90 acres)	YES	Peterborough; 52.608°N 0.212°W; TF212026	LNR, WTBCN	Map	Citation	This former brick pit has been designated an SSSI mainly for its invertebrates, especially its water beetles, with 64 species, including four on the British Red List of Threatened Species, Graptodytes bilineatus, Dryops similaris, Gyrinus distinctus and Myopites inulaedyssentericae.
Elsworth Wood	Elsworth Wood	✓		6.9 hectares (17 acres)	NO	Elsworth; 52.239°N 0.080°W; TL312618		Map	Citation	This site has three different uncommon types of woodland. The dominant tree is coppiced field maple, with a varied shrub layer and a considerable population of oxlips. There are several nationally uncommon beetles, such as the rove beetle Stichoglossa semirufa.
Ely Pits and Meadows	Ely Pits	✓	✓	85.8 hectares (212 acres)	PP	Ely; 52.403°N 0.283°E; TL554808	GCR, WTBCN	Map	Citation	This site has yielded an extensive assemblage of fossil reptiles dating to the Kimmeridgian, around 155 million years ago in the late Jurassic. Its biological interest lies mainly in its breeding birds, especially nationally rare wintering and breeding bitterns.
Eversden and Wimpole Woods	Eversden Wood	✓		66.6 hectares (165 acres)	YES	Great Eversden; 52.16°N 0.035°W; TL345531	SAC	Map	Citation	Wimpole Wood has six bat species, including the barbastelle, which is a very rare species in Britain; females give birth and raise young in tree crevices. Eversden Wood is a species rich example of a type of woodland rare in lowland Britain, with ancient ash and field maple trees.
Eye Gravel Pit	Eye Gravel Pit		✓	0.3 hectares (0.74 acres)	NO	Eye Green; 52.616°N 0.185°W; TF230036	GCR	Map	Citation	This former gravel quarry has marine and a few non-marine shells laid down when the area was under the North Sea, probably during the warm Eemian period, 130,000 to 115,000 years ago.
Fleam Dyke	Fleam Dyke	✓		11.8 hectares (29 acres)	YES	Fulbourn; 52.16°N 0.266°E; TL551539	SM	Map	Citation	Fleam Dyke is one of 286 sites selected by Charles Rothschild between 1912 and 1915 as wildlife sites "worthy of preservation" in Britain and Ireland. The steep banks of the earthwork have species-rich chalk grassland, a rare habitat in the county.
Fowlmere Watercress Beds	Fowlmere	✓		39.9 hectares (99 acres)	YES	Melbourn; 52.089°N 0.049°E; TL405454	RSPB	Map	Citation	A chalk stream runs through this nature reserve, and it has pools fed by chalk springs. Birds include kingfishers, water rails, corn buntings, sedge warblers, grasshopper warblers and starlings.
Fulbourn Fen	Fulbourn Fen	✓		27.3 hectares (67 acres)	YES	Fulbourn; 52.181°N 0.236°E; TL530560	WTBCN	Map	Citation	These are ancient meadows on calcareous loam and peat which have never been farmed, so they have a rich diversity of flora and fauna. Herbs in drier areas include cowslip and salad burnet, while wetter areas have tall fen vegetation.
Furze Hill	Furze Hill	✓		5.8 hectares (14 acres)	NO	Hildersham; 52.114°N 0.267°E; TL553486		Map	Citation	The site has steep banks of glacial deep sandy gravel, and is one of the few examples of a sandy habitat in the county. There are several rare plants, such as hoary cinquefoils, pasque flowers and maiden pinks.
Gamlingay Wood	Gamlingay Wood	✓		48.4 hectares (120 acres)	YES	Gamlingay; 52.165°N 0.186°W; TL242534	WTBCN	Map	Citation	This is ancient ash/maple woodland on sandy loam soil, an unusual habitat in lowland England. Ground flora include dog's mercury, yellow archangel, wood anemone and the nationally restricted oxlip. The flora is diverse due to the varied soils, and there are hundreds of species of mushrooms and toadstools.
Godmanchester Eastside Common	Godmanchester Eastside Common	✓		29.7 hectares (73 acres)	YES	Godmanchester; 52.325°N 0.139°W; TL269713		Map	Citation	There are two fields, with a disused railway line separating them. The habitats are calcareous loam and calcareous clay, both of which are unusual. The southern field has lines of medieval ridge and furrow.
Gog Magog Golf Course	Gog Magog Golf Course	✓		88.1 hectares (218 acres)	NO	Fulbourn; 52.165°N 0.174°E; TL488541		Map	Citation	The course is calcareous grassland which has a rich variety of flora. The main grasses are upright brome, red fescue and false oat-grass, and there are herbs such as the nationally rare moon carrot and the locally rare perennial flax.
Grafham Water	Grafham Water	✓		806.3 hectares (1,992 acres)	YES	Grafham; 52.297°N 0.319°W; TL147679	WTBCN	Map	Citation	This reservoir has nationally important numbers of wintering great crested grebes, tufted ducks and coots, and of moulting mute swans in late summer. A pond has a population of the nationally uncommon warty newt.
Great Stukeley Railway Cutting	Great Stukeley Railway Cutting	✓		34.7 hectares (86 acres)	NO	Huntingdon; 52.358°N 0.188°W; TL235748		Map	Citation	The site is calcareous clay grassland which has plants which were formerly common on the Huntingdonshire claylands, but are now scarce due to agricultural use. Rabbit grazing and occasional burning maintain the habitat.
Great Wilbraham Common	Great Wilbraham Common	✓		23.5 hectares (58 acres)	YES	Great Wilbraham; 52.195°N 0.243°E; TL534576		Map	Citation	This is one of the largest remaining areas of species-rich grassland in the county. Locally uncommon flora include purple milk-vetch, felwort, meadow saxifrage, green-winged orchid and sulphur clover.
Hardwick Wood	Hardwick Wood	✓		15.5 hectares (38 acres)	YES	Caldecote; 52.199°N 0.022°W; TL354576	WTBCN	Map	Citation	This medieval wood is now managed by coppicing. It is mainly ash and field maple, while the oldest parts have pedunculate oak with an understorey of hazel and hawthorn, while ground flora include early-purple orchid and yellow archangel.
Hayley Wood	Hayley Wood	✓		51.7 hectares (128 acres)	YES	Great Gransden; 52.159°N 0.114°W; TL291529	NCR, WTBCN	Map	Citation	The soil in this wood is heavy and often waterlogged, conditions which suit meadowsweet and oxlip. The numbers of oxlip declined from around 2 million to 250,000 due to the pressure of excessive numbers of deer, but they have revived since the construction of a fence in 2002. A parish boundary fence is estimated to date from the eleventh century or earlier, and it has high wildlife value.
Hemingford Grey Meadow	Hemingford Grey Meadow	✓		0.7 hectares (1.7 acres)	YES	Hemingford Grey; 52.306°N 0.108°W; TL291692	WTBCN	Map	Citation	The site is calcareous clay pasture with a wide variety of plant species, including the herbs oxeye daisy and yellow rattle. There are orchids such as common twayblades and common spotteds.
Hildersham Wood	Hildersham Wood	✓		7.4 hectares (18 acres)	NO	Hildersham; 52.087°N 0.238°E; TL534456		Map	Citation	The principal trees in this ancient wood on wet chalky clay are pedunculate oaks. The ground flora is diverse, including locally uncommon species such as broad-leaved helleborine and sweet woodruff.
Histon Road	Histon Road		✓	0.6 hectares (1.5 acres)	NO	Cambridge; 52.229°N 0.112°E; TL443611	GCR	Map	Citation	This is described by Natural England as a "key Pleistocene stratigraphic site". It is one only two sites in East Anglia which has an almost complete sequence of the second half of the warm Eemian interglacial, around 120,000 years ago.
Holland Hall (Melbourn) Railway Cutting	Holland Hall (Melbourn) Railway Cutting	✓		3.3 hectares (8.2 acres)	NO	Melbourn; 52.067°N 0.012°W; TL364428		Map	Citation	The site is steeply sloping chalk grassland, which has many plants which are unique in the county, and some which are nationally uncommon, such as wild candytuft. Also present is the nationally rare great pignut.
Holme Fen	Holme Fen	✓		269.4 hectares (666 acres)	YES	Holme; 52.486°N 0.224°W; TL207890	NCR, NNR	Map	Citation	Holme Fen is described by Natural England as the finest example of birch woodland in lowland Britain. Part of it was a mere which was drained in the nineteenth century, and some relict wetland plants survive such as saw sedge and fen wood-rush. It is part of the Great Fen project, which aims to create a 3,700 hectares (9,100 acres) wetland wildlife area.
Houghton Meadows	Houghton Meadows	✓		4.7 hectares (12 acres)	YES	Houghton; 52.327°N 0.104°W; TL293716	WTBCN	Map	Citation	Some of these fields are pasture and others are hay meadows, and they display ridges and furrows from medieval ploughing. Flowers include cowslips and yellow-rattles, and there are fauna such as green woodpeckers and great crested newts.
Kingston Wood and Outliers	Kingston Wood	✓		47.4 hectares (117 acres)	NO	Kingston; 52.17°N 0.064°W; TL325542		Map	Citation	This ancient woodland is ash and field maple on chalky clay, and it is described by Natural England as one of the oldest and most intact coppiced woodlands in the county. Ground flora include dog's mercury and the nationally restricted oxlip.
L-Moor, Shepreth	L-Moor	✓		6.6 hectares (16 acres)	YES	Shepreth; 52.108°N 0.022°E; TL386474	WTBCN	Map	Citation	This is unploughed calcareous grassland which has diverse flora such as horseshoe vetch and felwort in drier areas, and devil's bit scabious and fen bedstraw in wetter ones. The site is described by Natural England as valuable for its invertebrates.
Langley Wood	Langley Wood	✓		31.6 hectares (78 acres)	NO	Bartlow; 52.057°N 0.342°E; TL607424		Map	Citation	This ancient wood has coppiced ash and hornbeam, together with maple, hazel and oak. Flora include dog's mercury, sanicle and the uncommon sweet woodruff.
Little Catworth Meadow	Little Catworth Meadow	✓		5.2 hectares (13 acres)	NO	Catworth; 52.341°N 0.382°W; TL103727		Map	Citation	The meadow is traditionally managed grassland on calcareous loam, which is rare in Britain. It has mature hedgerows and a rich variety of plants such as salad burnet, dropwort, great burnet, green-winged orchid and adder's-tongue fern.
Little Paxton Pits	Little Paxton Pits	✓		127.4 hectares (315 acres)	PP	Little Paxton; 52.258°N 0.245°W; TL199637	LNR	Map	Citation	These flooded former gravel pits are of national importance for wintering wildfowl, especially gadwalls. There are several nationally rare flies, such as Spilogona scutulata and Lispocephala falculata. Flora include common spotted-orchids and hare's-foot clover.
Little Paxton Wood	Little Paxton Wood	✓		44.1 hectares (109 acres)	NO	Little Paxton; 52.258°N 0.290°W; TL168636		Map	Citation	This ancient wood is wet ash and maple on heavy calcareous clay, with seasonally waterlogged soils, and it has an extremely diverse flora. A double bank and ditch has wood melick, sweet violet and the nationally restricted spiked star-of-Bethlehem.
Madingley Wood	Madingley Wood	✓		15.2 hectares (38 acres)	NO	Cambridge; 52.217°N 0.048°E; TL400596		Map	Citation	The western part of this wood is ancient pedunculate oak, with other trees including ash and field maple, with hazel and hawthorn in the shrub layer. The newer eastern woodland is elm and ash. There is a variety of mosses. The site has been extensively used by Cambridge University for research and teaching.
Monks Wood and The Odd Quarter	Monks Wood	✓		169.3 hectares (418 acres)	PP	Wood Walton; 52.405°N 0.24°W; TL198800	NCR, NNR	Map	Citation	The site is described by Natural England as one of Britain's most important lowland woods. It is mainly of the wet ash-maple type, and trees include the rare wild service tree. There is ground flora typical of ancient woodland, together with woodland rides, ponds, streams and herb-rich grassland.
Nene Washes	Nene Washes	✓		1,522.9 hectares (3,763 acres)	PP	Peterborough; 52.58°N 0.07°W; TF307999	Ramsar, RSPB, SAC, SPA	Map	Citation	This is one of Britain's few remaining areas of washland, which are viewed by Natural England as vital for the survival of wildfowl and waders. Wintering wildfowls include wigeons and Bewick's swans. The rich flora in ditches include uncommon species such as frogbit and flowering rush.
Orton Pit	Orton Pit	✓		145.8 hectares (360 acres)	PP	Peterborough; 52.532°N 0.289°W; TL162941	SAC	Map	Citation	This extensive area of disused brick clay workings has the largest known population in Britain of great crested newts. There are ten species of stonewort, including Chara canescens, which was previously thought to be extinct in Britain, and four other nationally rare species.
Orwell Clunch Pit	Orwell Clunch Pit	✓		1.9 hectares (4.7 acres)	YES	Orwell; 52.137°N 0.01°W; TL363506		Map	Citation	This former stone quarry has a rich chalk grassland flora, a habitat which has become scarce in eastern England. Herbs including kidney vetch, horseshoe vetch, spiny restharrow and wild thyme.
Ouse Washes	Ouse Washes	✓		2,513.6 hectares (6,211 acres)	PP	Ely; 52.46°N 0.19°E; TL490879	NCR, Ramsar, RSPB, SAC, SPA, WTBCN, WWT	Map	Citation	The Washes are internationally significant for wintering and breeding wildfowl and waders, especially teal, pintails, wigeons, shovelers, pochards and Bewick's swans. The site also has rich aquatic fauna and flora, and areas of unimproved grassland.
Out and Plunder Woods	Out Wood	✓		38.6 hectares (95 acres)	FP	Great Bradley; 52.166°N 0.423°E; TL657547		Map	Citation	These woods on boulder clay have been little modified since the medieval period, which has allowed the development of a diverse fauna and flora. The main trees are ash, field maple and pedunculate oak, and herbs include sweet violet and early dog-violet.
Overhall Grove	Overhall Grove	✓		17.4 hectares (43 acres)	YES	Knapwell; 52.249°N 0.042°W; TL338630	NCR, WTBCN	Map	Citation	This site is the largest elm woodland in the county. It was seriously affected by Dutch elm disease, but many trees have regenerated from their bases, and the mixture of new growth and dead wood provides a very good habitat for insects and birds.
Papworth Wood	Papworth Wood	✓		8.7 hectares (21 acres)	YES	Papworth Everard; 52.249°N 0.11°W; TL291629		Map	Citation	This is one of the oldest secondary woods in the county. It has diverse ground flora including brambles, rough meadow grass, stinging nettles, ground ivy, bluebells and primroses.
Park Wood	Park Wood	✓		8.1 hectares (20 acres)	NO	Brinkley; 52.165°N 0.396°E; TL640546		Map	Citation	This is woodland of the wet ash/maple type, a scarce and declining habitat. Ground flora include bluebell, dog's mercury and oxlip, and there are indicators of ancient woodland such as herb-paris and butterfly-orchid.
Perry Woods	Perry Woods	✓		67.9 hectares (168 acres)	YES	Kimbolton; 52.284°N 0.336°W; TL136664		Map	Citation	These ancient woods are of the ash/maple type, an increasingly scarce habitat over its range in lowland England. The rich ground flora includes plants indicative of ancient woodland such as wood melick and early-purple orchid.
Portholme	Portholme	✓		106.0 hectares (262 acres)	YES	Huntingdon; 52.321°N 0.188°W; TL236708	NCR, SAC	Map	Citation	The site is an alluvial flood meadow, and one of the largest areas of grassland which is still traditionally managed as a Lammas meadow. Watercourses have some unusual invertebrates, including the nationally restricted dragonfly Libellula fulva.
Roman Road	Roman Road	✓		12.4 hectares (31 acres)	YES	Cambridge; 52.145°N 0.229°E; TL526520	SM	Map	Citation	This green lane has calcareous grassland, thick hedges and small copses, which provide a valuable habitat for invertebrates. There are grasses such as sheep's-fescue and quaking-grass, while herbs include wild carrot and purple milk-vetch.
Sawston Hall Meadows	Sawston Hall Meadows	✓		7.4 hectares (18 acres)	NO	Sawston; 52.119°N 0.176°E; TL491490		Map	Citation	This site has spring fed peat meadows on chalk, a habitat formerly common but now rare. It has the nationally rare flower Selinum carvifolia, which is only found in Cambridgeshire. Drier grassland has a varied flora including spotted-orchid.
Shippea Hill	Shippea Hill		✓	27.6 hectares (68 acres)	NO	Littleport; 52.438°N 0.407°E; TL637850	GCR	Map	Citation	The succession of sedimentary layers in the Fens in the Holocene epoch, the period since the last ice age, was determined on the basis of this site. It is particularly important for dating the "Fen Clay transgression" of the sea into the Fens in the Neolithic.
Snailwell Meadows	Snailwell Meadows	✓		15.2 hectares (38 acres)	NO	Snailwell; 52.284°N 0.4°E; TL638678		Map	Citation	The meadows are on peat overlying spring-fed chalk, with a variety of soil conditions. Some areas are dry calcareous pasture, and others are wet neutral and marshy acidic grassland. Flowering plants include the nationally rare umbellifer Cambridge milk-parsley.
Soham Wet Horse Fen	Soham Wet Horse Fen	✓		33.8 hectares (84 acres)	PP	Soham; 52.33°N 0.364°E; TL612728	WTBCN	Map	Citation	This site is neutral grassland with diverse fauna and flora, including uncommon ones. Wetter areas have herbs such as green-winged orchids and adder's tongue fern, and there are cowslips and stemless thistles in drier parts. snipe breed in wet pastures.
Southorpe Meadow	Southorpe Meadow	✓		2.0 hectares (4.9 acres)	YES	Southorpe; 52.615°N 0.402°W; TF083031	WTBCN	Map	Citation	This is one of the few surviving areas of neutral grassland in the county, where ridge and furrow from medieval ploughing can be seen. There is a rich variety of species, such as red fescue in drier areas, and salad burnet in damper ones.
Southorpe Paddock	Southorpe Paddock	✓		1.6 hectares (4.0 acres)	YES	Southorpe; 52.606°N 0.401°W; TF084021	WTBCN	Map	Citation	This site is a rare example of unimproved grassland on the Jurassic limestone of eastern England. It has typical limestone plants such as purple milk-vetch and clustered bellflower. Mature hedgerows provide additional habitats for wildlife.
Southorpe Roughs	Southorpe Roughs	✓		9.8 hectares (24 acres)	NO	Southorpe; 52.615°N 0.417°W; TF073031		Map	Citation	This is a disused quarry which has grassland on Jurassic limestone. The main grasses are tor-grass and sheep's fescue, and there are the nationally rare plants spotted cat's ear and pasque flower.
St Neots Common	St Neots Common	✓		33.4 hectares (83 acres)	YES	St Neots; 52.236°N 0.271°W; TL182612		Map	Citation	This site on the east bank of the River Great Ouse has grassland, willow carr, ditches and ponds, which support diverse wildlife species. The grassland is traditionally maintained by grazing, and herbs in wetter areas include marsh orchids and marsh arrow grass.
Stow-Cum-Quy Fen	Stow-Cum-Quy Fen	✓		29.9 hectares (74 acres)	YES	Lode; 52.243°N 0.219°E; TL516628		Map	Citation	The site is calcareous loam pasture, with diverse flora and open pools which have rare aquatic plants. Grassland herbs include purging flax and salad burnet, and there are aquatic plants such as unbranched bur-reed, mare's tail and bladderwort.
Sutton Heath and Bog	Sutton Heath and Bog	✓		18.3 hectares (45 acres)	FP	Wansford; 52.587°N 0.394°W; TF089000		Map	Citation	This site has calcareous grassland on Jurassic limestone and base-poor marshy neutral grassland. The base poor areas have a diverse variety of plant species, including some which are locally uncommon.
Ten Wood	Ten Wood	✓		17.7 hectares (44 acres)	NO	Burrough Green; 52.175°N 0.432°E; TL664559		Map	Citation	This ancient wood is of the ash/maple type, which has a high conservation value as it has a restricted and declining distribution. Other trees include hazel and pedunculate oak. There is also a population of the rare oxlip.
Thriplow Meadows	Thriplow Meadows	✓		3.5 hectares (8.6 acres)	YES	Thriplow; 52.102°N 0.097°E; TL437469		Map	Citation	The site has two fields with neutral pastures which range from dry to marshy. These lowland habitats are now rare. Wetland herbs include ragged robin, fleabane and purple loosestrife.
Thriplow Peat Holes	Thriplow Peat Holes	✓		12.2 hectares (30 acres)	NO	Thriplow; 52.107°N 0.116°E; TL450475		Map	Citation	The site has rare alder carr and fen habitats, enhanced by ditches and ponds, with a wide variety of invertebrates. The main vegetation is alder, ash, willow and guelder rose.
Traveller's Rest Pit	Traveller's Rest Pit		✓	2.3 hectares (5.7 acres)	NO	Cambridge; 52.218°N 0.09°E; TL429598	GCR	Map	Citation	This is described by Natural England as an important site dating to the Anglian ice age around 450,000 years ago. It also has the most extensive collection of Paleolithic stone tools in the county, which are thought to date to the Cromerian Stage, which preceded the Anglian.
Upware Bridge Pit North	Upware Bridge Pit North		✓	2.5 hectares (6.2 acres)	NO	Wicken; 52.329°N 0.263°E; TL543725	GCR	Map	Citation	This site shows exposes rocks of Oxfordian age, around 160 million years ago. It was then a sea which was connected to the Tethys Ocean, and it has many Tethyan invertebrate fossils. It is described by Natural England as "an essential site for the study of Oxfordian palaeontology and palaeogeography in the English midlands".
Upware North Pit	Upware North Pit	✓		1.1 hectares (2.7 acres)	YES	Wicken; 52.331°N 0.264°E; TL544727		Map	Citation	This site has several flooded pits with areas of willow and hawthorn. It is one of only two British sites which has water germander, a plant listed in the British Red List of Threatened Species. Other unusual aquatic plants are great water dock and greater pond sedge.
Upware South Pit	Upware South Pit		✓	1.1 hectares (2.7 acres)	YES	Upware; 52.315°N 0.256°E; TL539709	GCR	Map	Citation	This site has rocks dating to the Oxfordian stage, around 160 million years ago. It was then a coral reef, and has fossils of bivalves and ammonites, as well as corals, which show affinities with the fauna of the Tethys Ocean. It is described by Natural England as a key site in study of the Oxfordian.
Upwood Meadows	Upwood Meadows	✓		6.0 hectares (15 acres)	YES	Upwood; 52.427°N 0.162°W; TL251826	NCR, NNR, WTBCN	Map	Citation	The site has three fields on calcareous clay with poor drainage, a type of pasture now very rare, and was described by Derek Ratcliffe as having "an outstandingly rich and diverse flora". One of the fields, which is agriculturally unimproved, has medieval ridge and furrow.
Wansford Pasture	Wansford Pasture	✓		3.1 hectares (7.7 acres)	YES	Wansford; 52.582°N 0.424°W; TL069994	WTBCN	Map	Citation	This is a south-facing slope, with Jurassic limestone grassland and a flush lower down which has a wide variety of wet-loving plants, including some which are rare in the county. The ecology is maintained by avoiding the use of fertilisers and herbicides, and by grazing.
Warboys and Wistow Woods	Warboys Wood	✓		44.5 hectares (110 acres)	PP	Warboys; 52.419°N 0.090°W; TL300818	WTBCN	Map	Citation	These woods have high conservation value because they are ancient ash and maple, and this habitat has sharply declined in extent since 1945. The woods have diverse flora and fauna, particularly invertebrates.
Warboys Clay Pit	Warboys Clay Pit		✓	12.6 hectares (31 acres)	NO	Warboys; 52.419°N 0.08°W; TL307818	GCR	Map	Citation	According to Natural England this "unrivalled Oxfordian section shows more than 20 metres (66 ft) of Upper Oxford Clay". It has ammonite fossils dating to the Late Jurassic, around 160 million years ago.
Waresley Wood	Waresley Wood	✓		54.2 hectares (134 acres)	YES	Waresley; 52.177°N 0.156°W; TL262548	WTBCN	Map	Citation	This ancient woodland is mainly ash, field maple and hazel. There are also rides with diverse flora such as the herbs bush vetch, meadowsweet, greater burnet-saxifrage and self-heal.
Weaveley and Sand Woods	Weaverley Wood	✓		62.0 hectares (153 acres)	NO	Gamlingay; 52.171°N 0.209°W; TL226540		Map	Citation	This site has an unusually varied geology, with areas of free-draining Lower Greensand, poorly drained boulder clay and Jurassic clays. The wood is of ancient origin, and tree species include pedunculate oak and coppiced ash and field maple. Hazel is dominant in the shrub layer. There are uncommon flowers such as herb-paris, butterfly orchid and pignut.
West, Abbot's and Lound Woods	West, Abbot's and Lound Woods	✓		50.4 hectares (125 acres)	NO	Wittering; 52.596°N 0.438°W; TF059010		Map	Citation	The site has a variety of woodland types, some of which are rare in Britain, including plateau alderwood. There are ancient woodland plants such as yellow archangel and toothwort.
Whitewater Valley	Whitewater Valley	✓		4.3 hectares (11 acres)	NO	Wittering; 52.620°N 0.461°W; TF043036		Map	Citation	Habitats in this site include a stream together with associated marsh, tall fen and willow carr. The carr has a varied flora, and the marsh has many plants rare in the county. There are also springs, which have mosses including the uncommon cratoneuron commutatum.
Whittlesford - Thriplow Hummocky Fields		✓		55.6 hectares (137 acres)	NO	Whittlesford; 52.115°N 0.112°E; TL447484		Map	Citation	This site has the nationally rare grass-poly, and the nationally uncommon fairy shrimp chirocephalus diaphanus. They are found in shallow hollows in arable fields, which are the result of ice lenses melting at the end of the last ice age.
Wicken Fen	Wicken Fen	✓		255.0 hectares (630 acres)	YES	Wicken; 52.307°N 0.278°E; TL554701	NCR, NNR, NT, Ramsar, SAC	Map	Citation	This is one of the few surviving East Anglian peat fens, and it has diverse flora and fauna. Herbs include milk parsley and yellow loosestrife, and pools have uncommon aquatic plants such as greater spearwort and lesser water plantain.
Wilbraham Fens	Wilbraham Fens	✓		62.0 hectares (153 acres)	NO	Cambridge; 52.209°N 0.222°E; TL519591		Map	Citation	This is an example of a fen habitat, which is now rare in Britain, with grassland, scrub, ponds and ditches. The dominant fen species is common reed, which is present in dense stands, together with plants such as purple loosestrife and meadow rue. Herbs include harebell and field scabious.
Woodwalton Fen	Woodwalton Fen	✓		208.7 hectares (516 acres)	YES	Ramsey; 52.445°N 0.193°W; TL229845	NCR, NNR, Ramsar, SAC	Map	Citation	This site has one of the few remaining ranges of flora characteristic of the East Anglian Fens. There are rare fen plants such as fen wood-rush and fen violet, and ditches have uncommon aquatic plants including bladderwort and water violet.
Woodwalton Marsh	Woodwalton Marsh	✓		0.8 hectares (2.0 acres)	YES	Ramsey; 52.415°N 0.221°W; TL211812	WTBCN	Map	Citation	This grassland on calcareous clay has diverse flora, including red fescue, quaking grass, knapweed, cowslip, pepper saxifrage, green-winged orchid and the rare sulphur clover. There is also a wide variety of butterflies.

== See also ==
- List of Local Nature Reserves in Cambridgeshire
- National nature reserves in Cambridgeshire

== Sources ==
- Ratcliffe, Derek, ed. (1977). A Nature Conservation Review. Vol. 2. Cambridge, UK: Cambridge University Press. ISBN 0-521-21403-3.
