= Upware South Pit =

Protected area in Cambridgeshire, England

Coordinates: 52.315°N 0.256°E

- Site of Special Scientific Interest
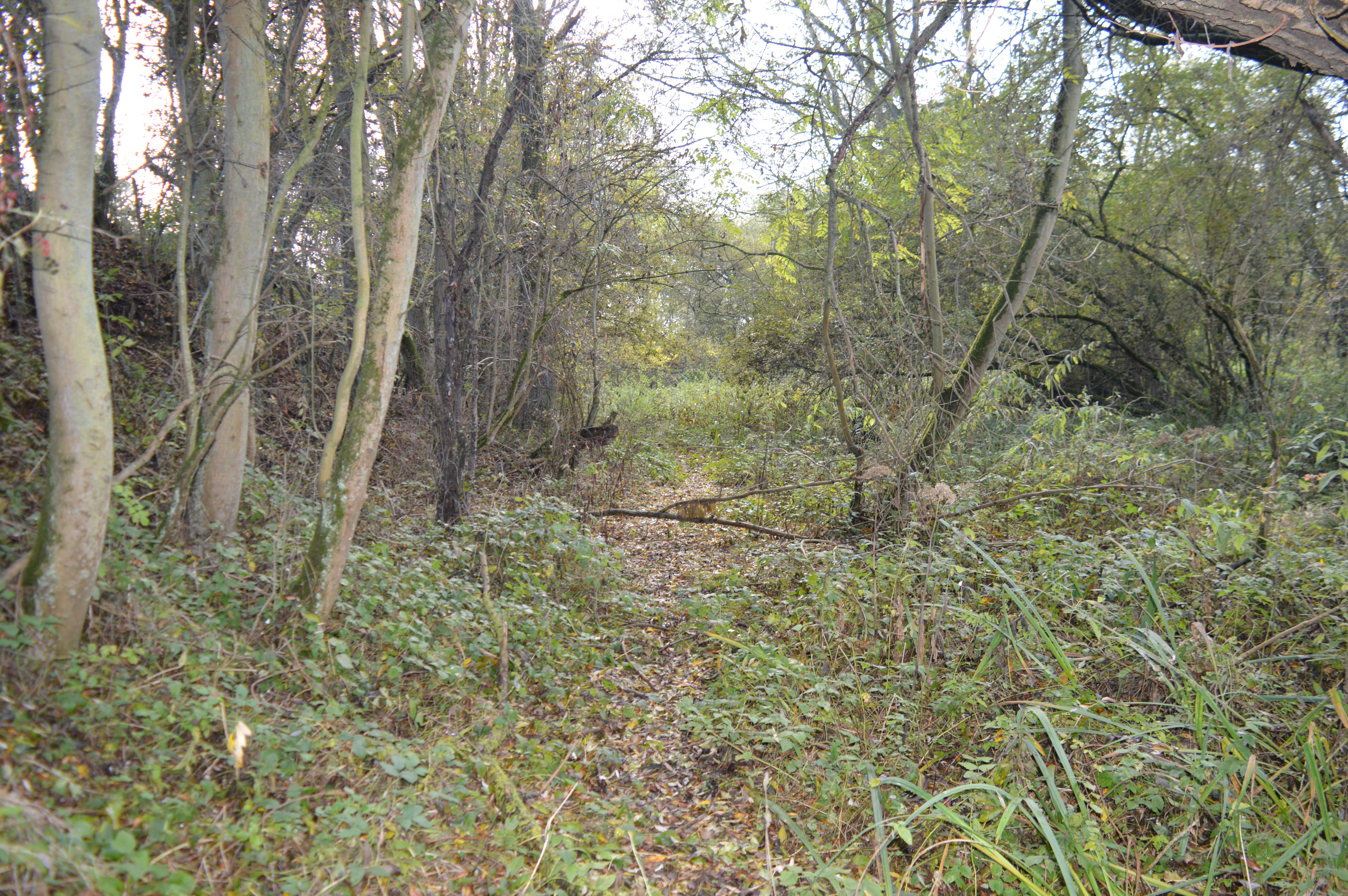
- Location of Upware South Pit.
- Area of search: Cambridgeshire
- Grid reference: TL 539 709
- Interest: Geological
- Area: 1.1 hectares
- Notification date: 1989
- Location map: Magic Map

Upware South Pit is a 1.1-hectare (2.7-acre) geological Site of Special Scientific Interest (SSSI) north of Upware in Cambridgeshire. It is a Geological Conservation Review site.

This site has rocks dating to the Oxfordian stage, around 160 million years ago. It was then a coral reef, and has fossils of bivalves and ammonites, as well as corals, which show affinities with the fauna of the Tethys Ocean. It is described by Natural England as a key site in study of the Oxfordian.

There is access to the site from the Fen Rivers Way north of Upware. A small area of pasture in the north of the site, which is not open to the public, is also part of the Cam Washes biological SSSI.

== Land ownership ==
All land within Upware South Pit SSSI is owned by the local authority.
