= Ely Pits and Meadows =

Protected area in Cambridgeshire, England

Coordinates: 52.402°N 0.289°E

- Site of Special Scientific Interest
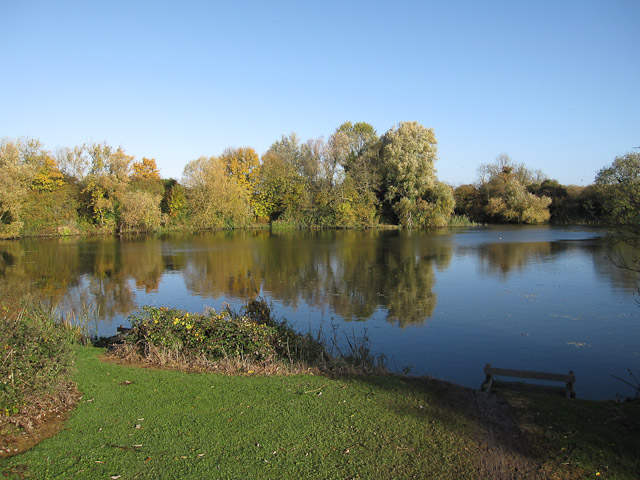
- Location of Ely Pits and Meadows.
- Area of search: Cambridgeshire
- Grid reference: TL 558 807
- Interest: Biological; Geological
- Area: 85.8 hectares
- Notification date: 2008
- Location map: Magic Map

Ely Pits and Meadows is an 85.8-hectare (212-acre) Site of Special Scientific Interest (SSSI) on the eastern outskirts of Ely in Cambridgeshire. It is the only SSSI in the county which is designated both for its biological and geological interest. It is also a Geological Conservation Review site, and an area of 8 hectares is the Roswell Pits nature reserve, which is managed by the Wildlife Trust for Bedfordshire, Cambridgeshire and Northamptonshire.

This site on the bank of the River Great Ouse has disused clay and beet pits, grassland and ponds. It has yielded an extensive assemblage of fossils reptiles dating to the Kimmeridgian, around 155 million years ago in the late Jurassic. Its biological interest lies mainly in its breeding birds, especially nationally rare wintering and breeding bitterns. There are also water voles and at least six species of bat.

There is access to Roswell Pits by a footpath from Kiln Lane.
