= Sawston Hall Meadows =

Protected area in Cambridgeshire, England

Coordinates: 52.119°N 0.176°E

- Site of Special Scientific Interest
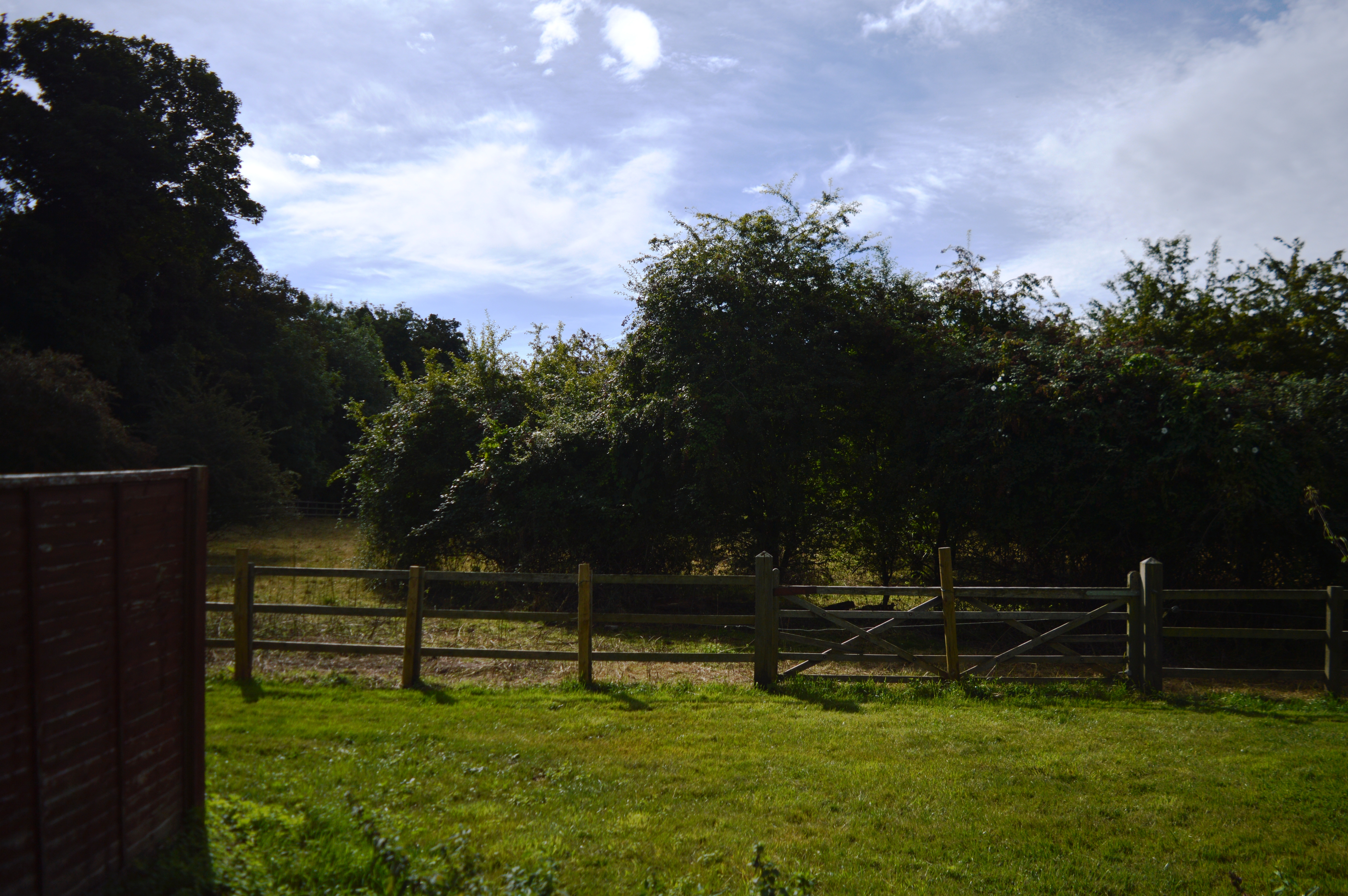
- Location of Sawston Hall Meadows.
- Area of search: Cambridgeshire
- Grid reference: TL 491 490
- Interest: Biological
- Area: 7.4 hectares
- Notification date: 1982
- Location map: Magic Map

Sawston Hall Meadows is a 7.4-hectare (18-acre) biological Site of Special Scientific Interest in Sawston in Cambridgeshire.

This site has spring fed peat meadows on chalk, a habitat formerly common but now rare. It has the nationally rare flower Selinum carvifolia, which is only found in Cambridgeshire. Drier grassland has a varied flora including spotted-orchid.

The site is private land with no public access.
