= Caldecote Meadows =

UK Site of Special Scientific Interest

Coordinates: 52.202°N 0.029°W

- Site of Special Scientific Interest
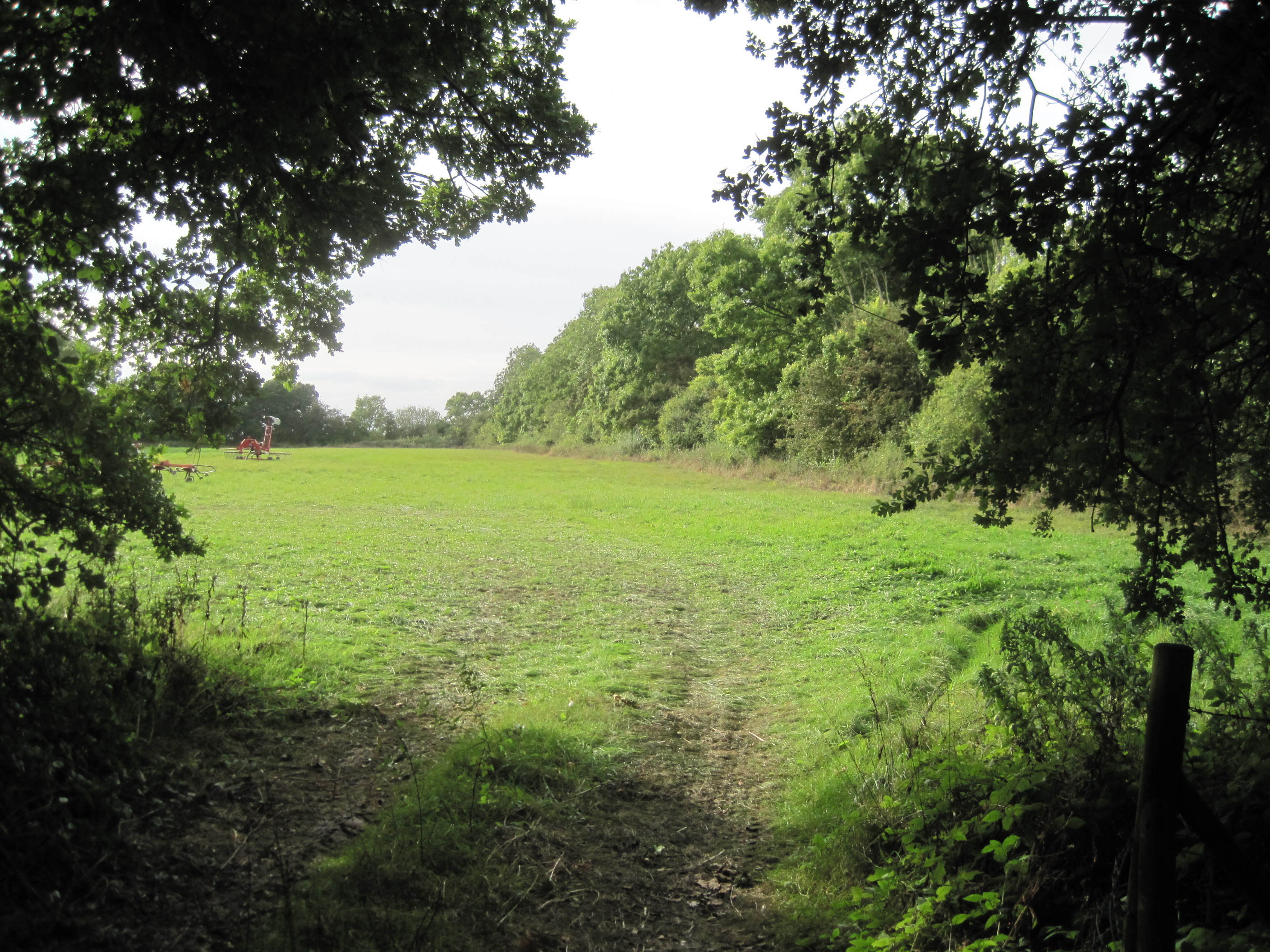
- Location of Caldecote Meadows.
- Area of search: Cambridgeshire
- Grid reference: TL 348 578
- Interest: Biological
- Area: 9.1 hectares
- Notification date: 1985
- Location map: Magic Map

Caldecote Meadows is a 9.1-hectare (22-acre) biological Site of Special Scientific Interest in Caldecote in Cambridgeshire.

The site is herb-rich calcareous grassland, which was formerly common in the county, but is now rare. It is traditionally managed by hay cutting and grazing, and plants include salad burnet and dropwort.

The site is private land with no public access.
