= Thriplow Meadows =

UK site of special scientific interest for its ecological value

Coordinates: 52.102°N 0.097°E

- Site of Special Scientific Interest
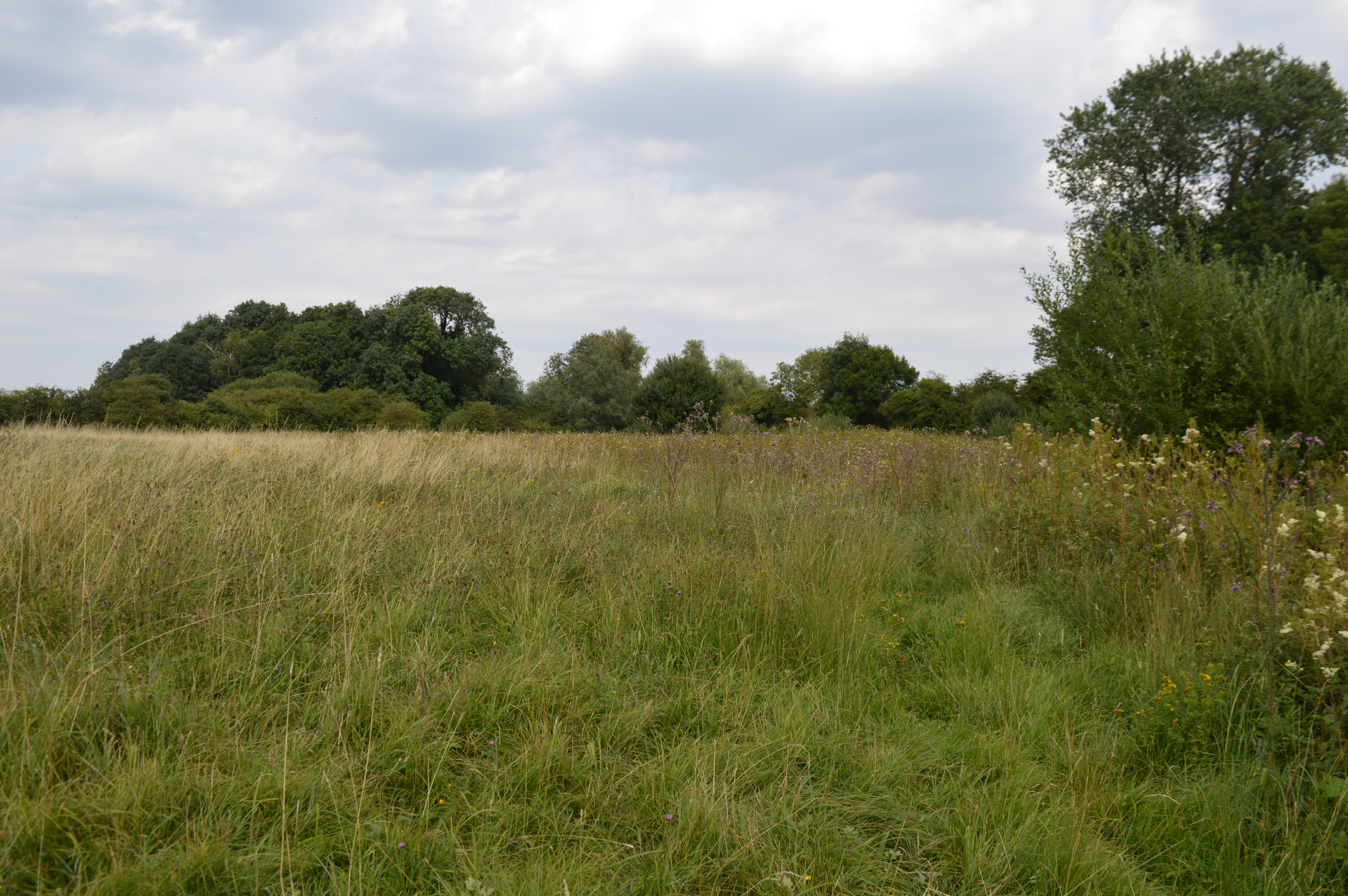
- The northern field
- Location of Thriplow Meadows.
- Area of search: Cambridgeshire
- Grid reference: TL437469
- Interest: Biological
- Area: 3.5 ha (8.6 acres)
- Notification date: 1984
- Location map: Magic Map

Thriplow Meadows is a 3.5-hectare (8.6-acre) biological Site of Special Scientific Interest in Thriplow in Cambridgeshire.

The site has two fields with neutral pastures which range from dry to marshy. These lowland habitats are now rare, and the wetter areas have many uncommon plants. Wetland herbs include ragged robin, fleabane and purple loosestrife.

There is access from School Lane.
