= Shippea Hill SSSI =

Protected area in Cambridgeshire, England

Coordinates: 52.438°N 0.407°E

- Site of Special Scientific Interest
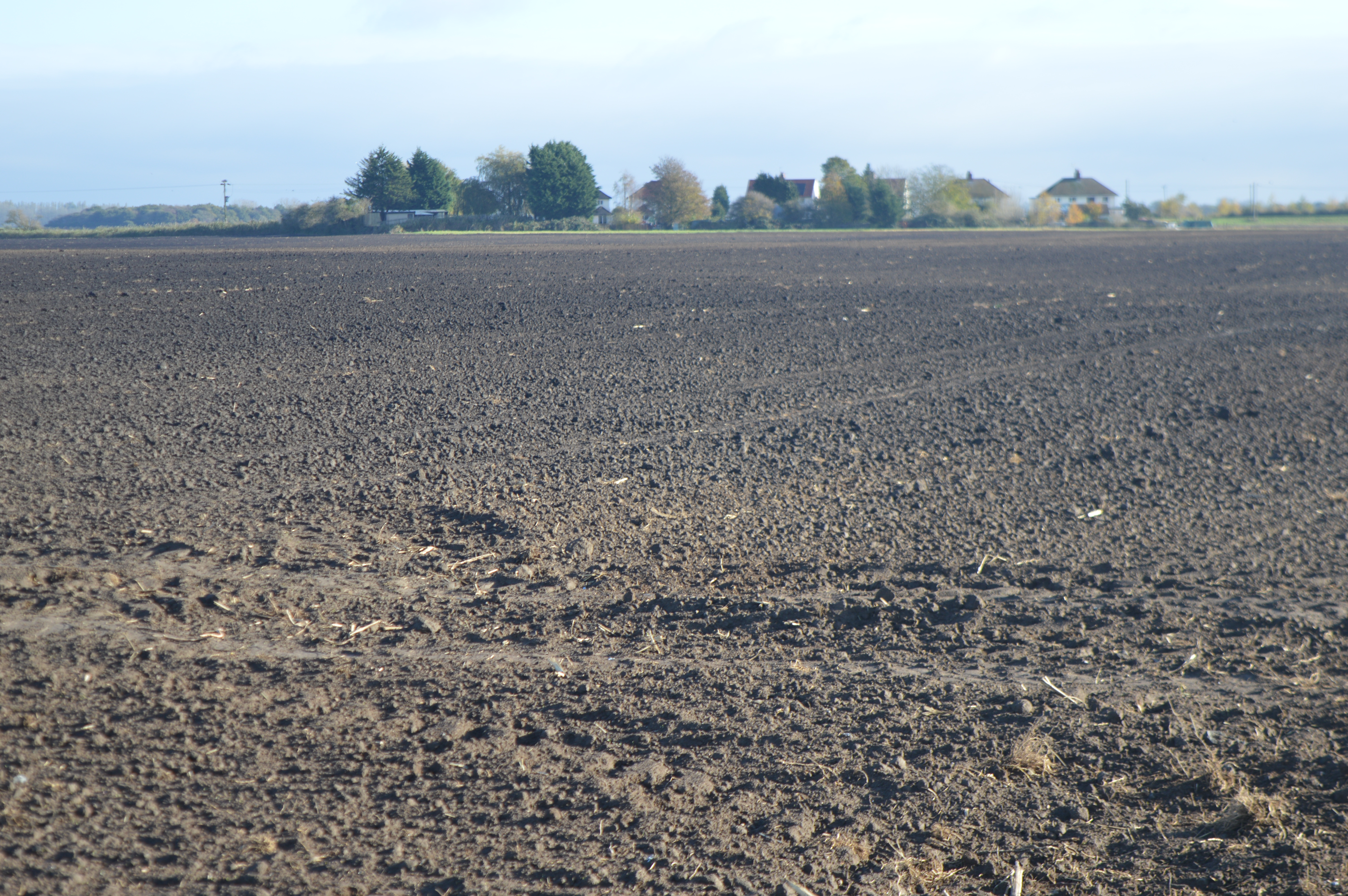
- Location of Shippea Hill SSSI.
- Area of search: Cambridgeshire
- Grid reference: TL 637 850
- Interest: Geological
- Area: 27.6 hectares
- Notification date: 1989
- Location map: Magic Map

Shippea Hill SSSI is a 27.6-hectare (68-acre) geological Site of Special Scientific Interest east of Ely in Cambridgeshire, England. It is a Geological Conservation Review site.

The succession of sedimentary layers in the Fens in the Holocene epoch, the period since the last ice age, was determined in the 1930s on the basis of Shippea Hill deposits, although this has been amended as the site has been found to be atypical. It is particularly important for dating the "Fen Clay transgression" of the sea into the Fens in the Holocene.

In the early 1930s the pioneer of British Mesolithic archaeology, Grahame Clark collaborated with the botanists Harry and Margaret Godwin to gain a deeper understanding of the environment of past societies by integrating archaeological findings with new scientific techniques in geology and plant sciences. They formed the Fenland Research Committee to study the effect of post-glacial environmental changes on Fenland Mesolithic communities, and their first major collaboration was excavation of Shippea Hill.

The site is on private land with no public access. It has been filled in and is now a field.
