= Hildersham Wood =

Natural area in Cambridgeshire, England

Coordinates: 52.087°N 0.238°E

- Site of Special Scientific Interest
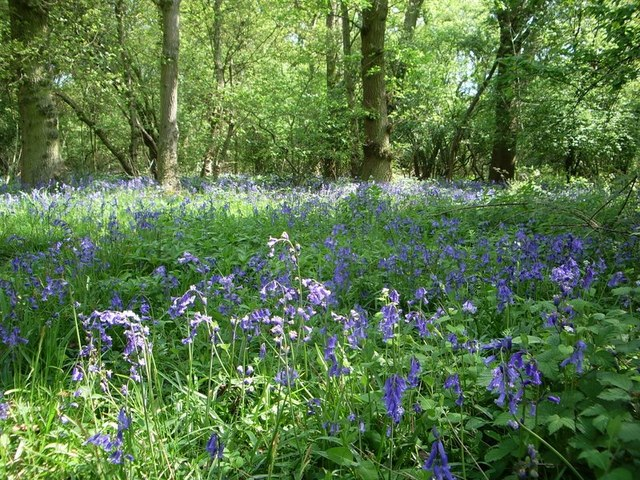
- Location of Hildersham Wood.
- Area of search: Cambridgeshire
- Grid reference: TL 534 456
- Interest: Biological
- Area: 7.7 hectares
- Notification date: 1985
- Location map: Magic Map

Hildersham Wood is a 7.7-hectare (19-acre) biological Site of Special Scientific Interest south of Hildersham in Cambridgeshire.

The principal trees in this ancient wood, on wet chalky clay, are pedunculate oaks. The ground flora is diverse, including locally uncommon species such as broad-leaved helleborine and sweet woodruff. There are a variety of mosses and ferns.

The site is private land with no public access.
