= Holland Hall (Melbourn) Railway Cutting =

Protected area in Cambridgeshire, England

Coordinates: 52.067°N 0.012°W

- Site of Special Scientific Interest
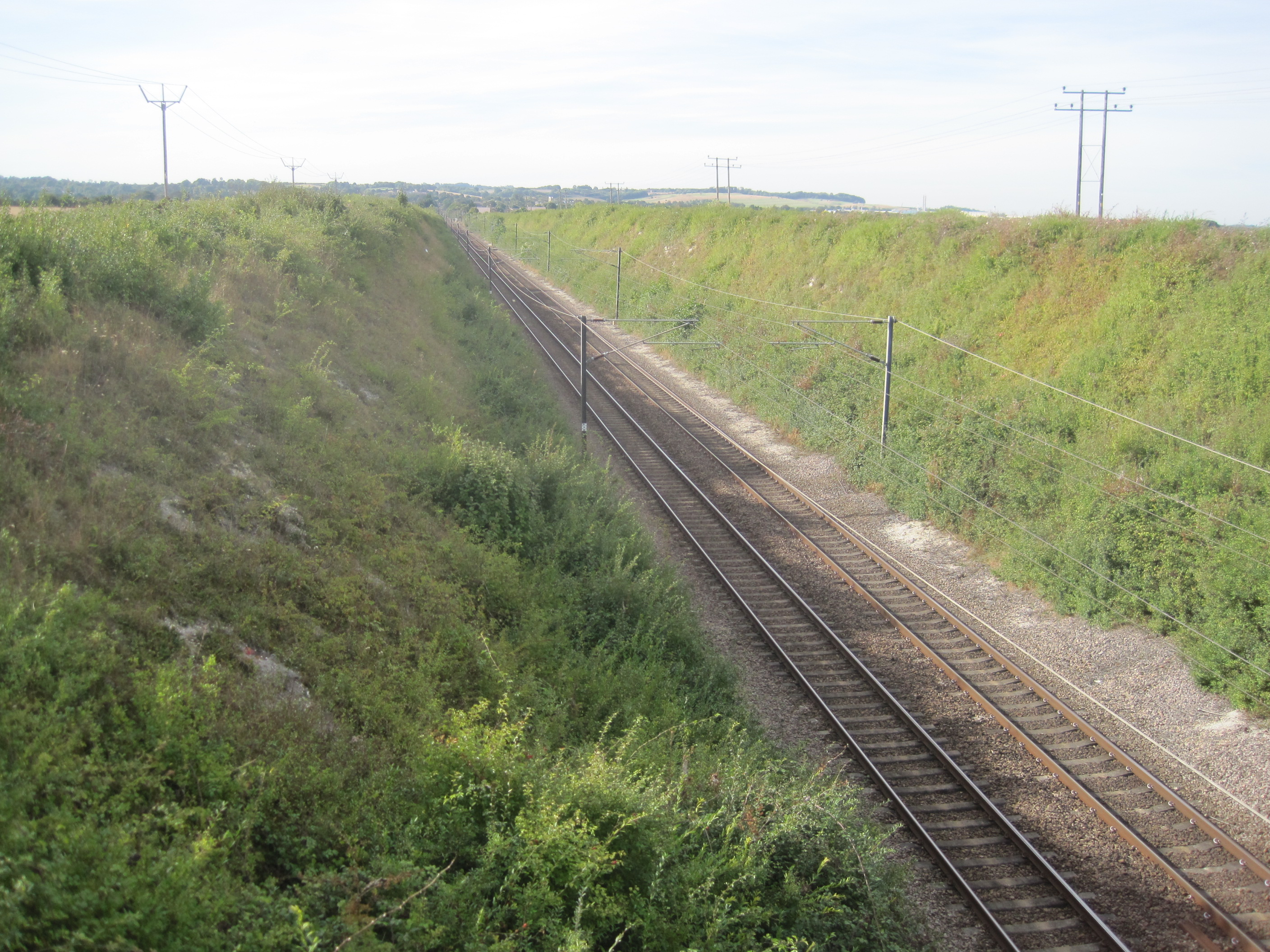
- Location of Holland Hall (Melbourn) Railway Cutting.
- Area of search: Cambridgeshire
- Grid reference: TL 364 428
- Interest: Biological
- Area: 3.3 hectares
- Notification date: 1986
- Location map: [ Magic Map]

Holland Hall (Melbourn) Railway Cutting is a 3.3-hectare (8.2-acre) biological Site of Special Scientific Interest near Melbourn in Cambridgeshire. It is the verge of a kilometre long stretch of an operational railway line, the Cambridge Line.

The site is steeply sloping chalk grassland, which has many plants which are unique in the county, and some which are nationally uncommon, such as wild candytuft. Also present is the nationally rare great pignut.

There is no public access to the site.
