= Madingley Wood =

Biological Site of Special Scientific Interest

Coordinates: 52.217°N 0.048°E

- Site of Special Scientific Interest
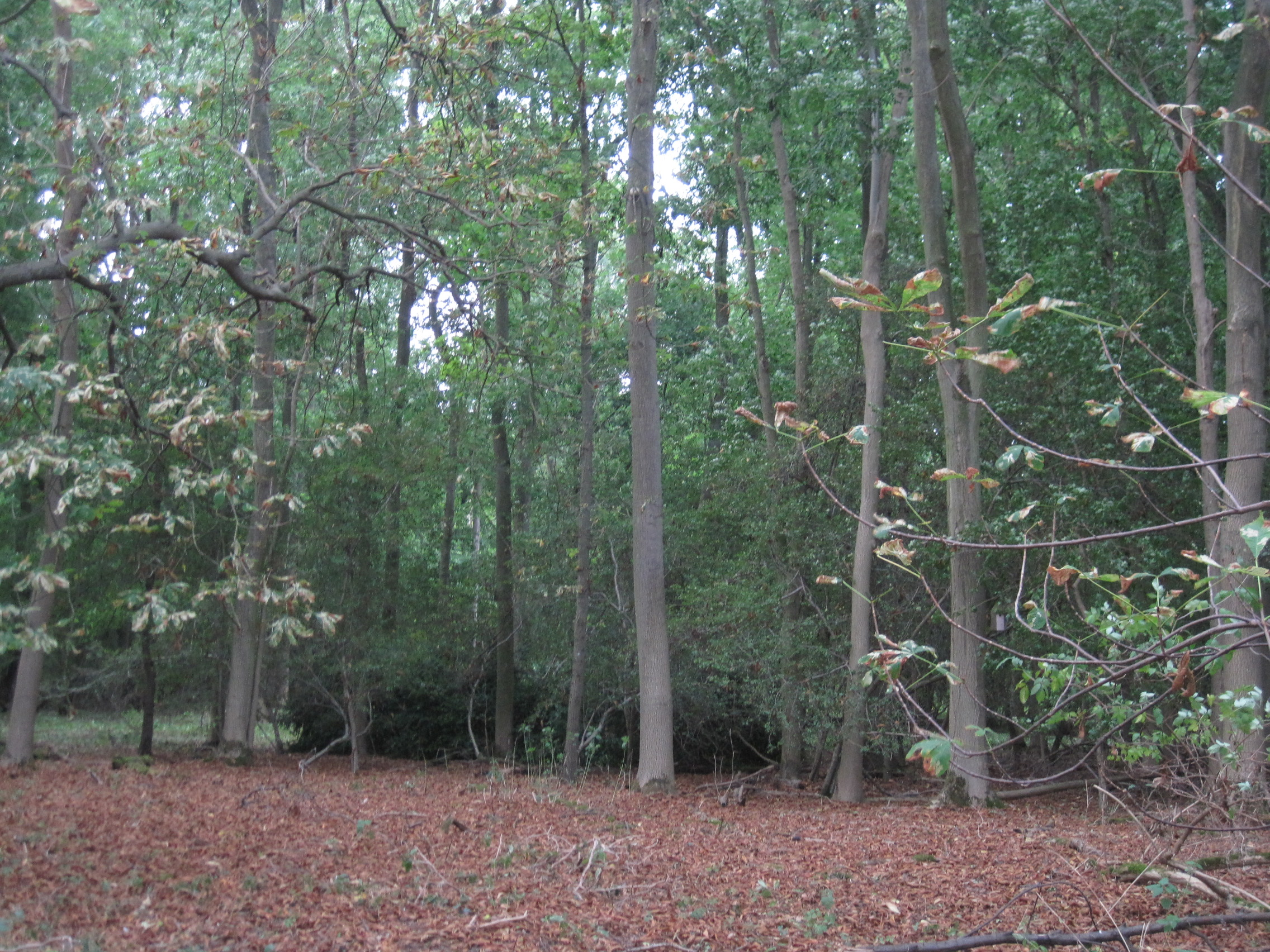
- Location of Madingley Wood.
- Area of search: Cambridgeshire
- Grid reference: TL 400 596
- Interest: Biological
- Area: 15.4 hectares
- Notification date: 1986
- Location map: Magic Map

Madingley Wood is a 15.4-hectare (38-acre) biological Site of Special Scientific Interest near Madingley, on the western outskirts of Cambridge.

The western part of this wood is ancient pedunculate oak, with other trees including ash and field maple, with hazel and hawthorn in the shrub layer. The newer eastern woodland is elm and ash. There is a variety of mosses. The site has been extensively used by Cambridge University for research and teaching.

The site is private land with no public access, although a public footpath crosses the eastern end of the wood.

The SSSI adjoins the site of Cambridge University's "800 Wood", a 10-hectare site planted with 15,000 trees to mark the 800th anniversary of the university in 2009.
