= Delph Bridge Drain =

UK Site of Special Scientific Interest

Coordinates: 52.367°N 0.3°E

- Site of Special Scientific Interest
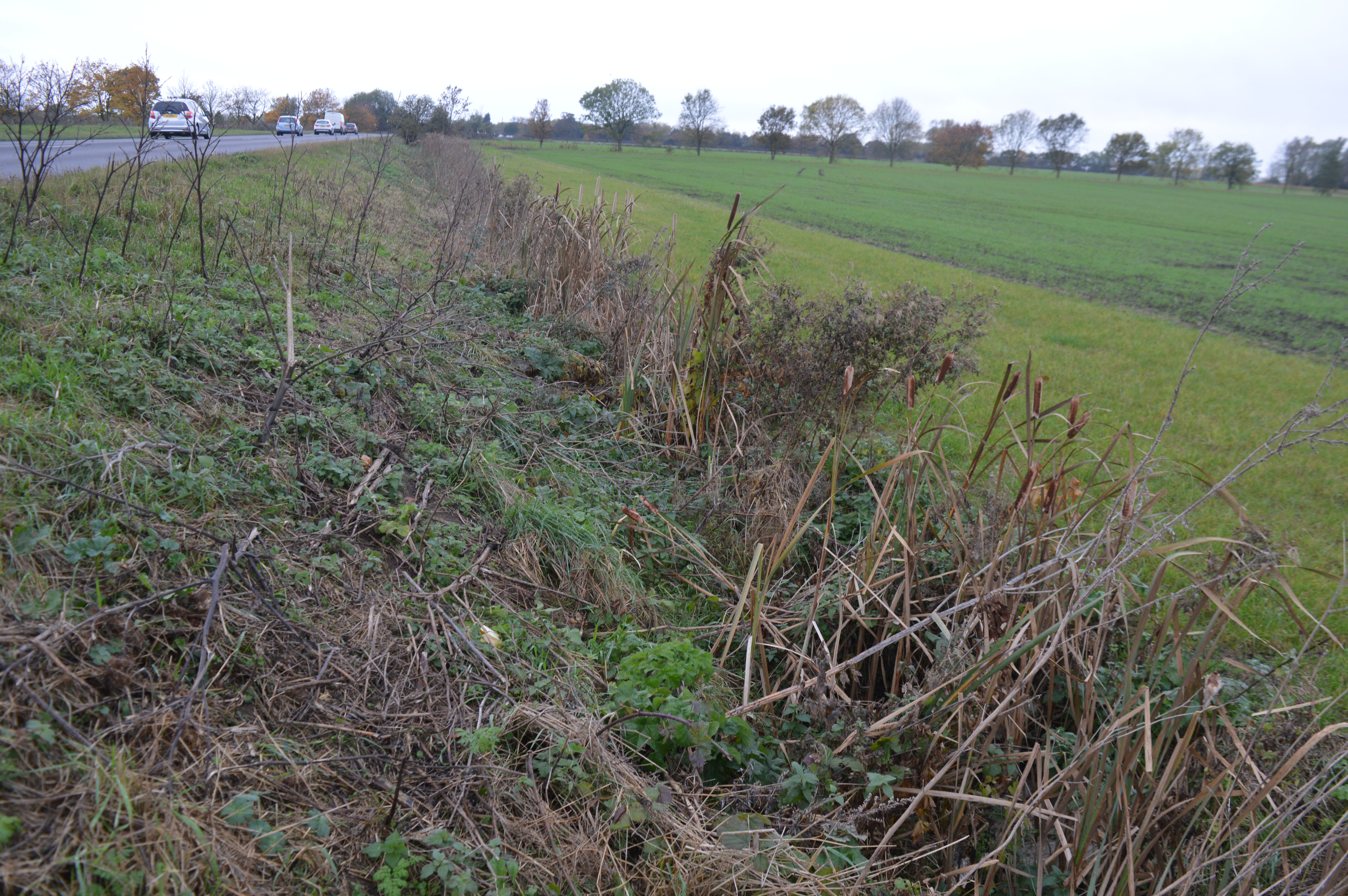
- Location of Delph Bridge Drain.
- Area of search: Cambridgeshire
- Grid reference: TL 567 768
- Interest: Biological
- Area: 0.15 hectares
- Notification date: 1989
- Location map: Magic Map

Delph Bridge Drain is a 0.15-hectare (0.37-acre) biological Site of Special Scientific Interest north-west of Soham in Cambridgeshire.

This site has the only known British population of fen ragwort, which was previously believed to have become extinct in the UK in 1857, due to habitat destruction. It was re-discovered in 1971 when dormant seeds probably germinated following excavation of the drain.

The site is a short stretch of ditch next to the A142 road between Soham and Ely.
