= Perry Woods =

Site of Special Scientific Interest (SSSI), Cambridgeshire, England

Coordinates: 52.284°N 0.336°W

- Site of Special Scientific Interest
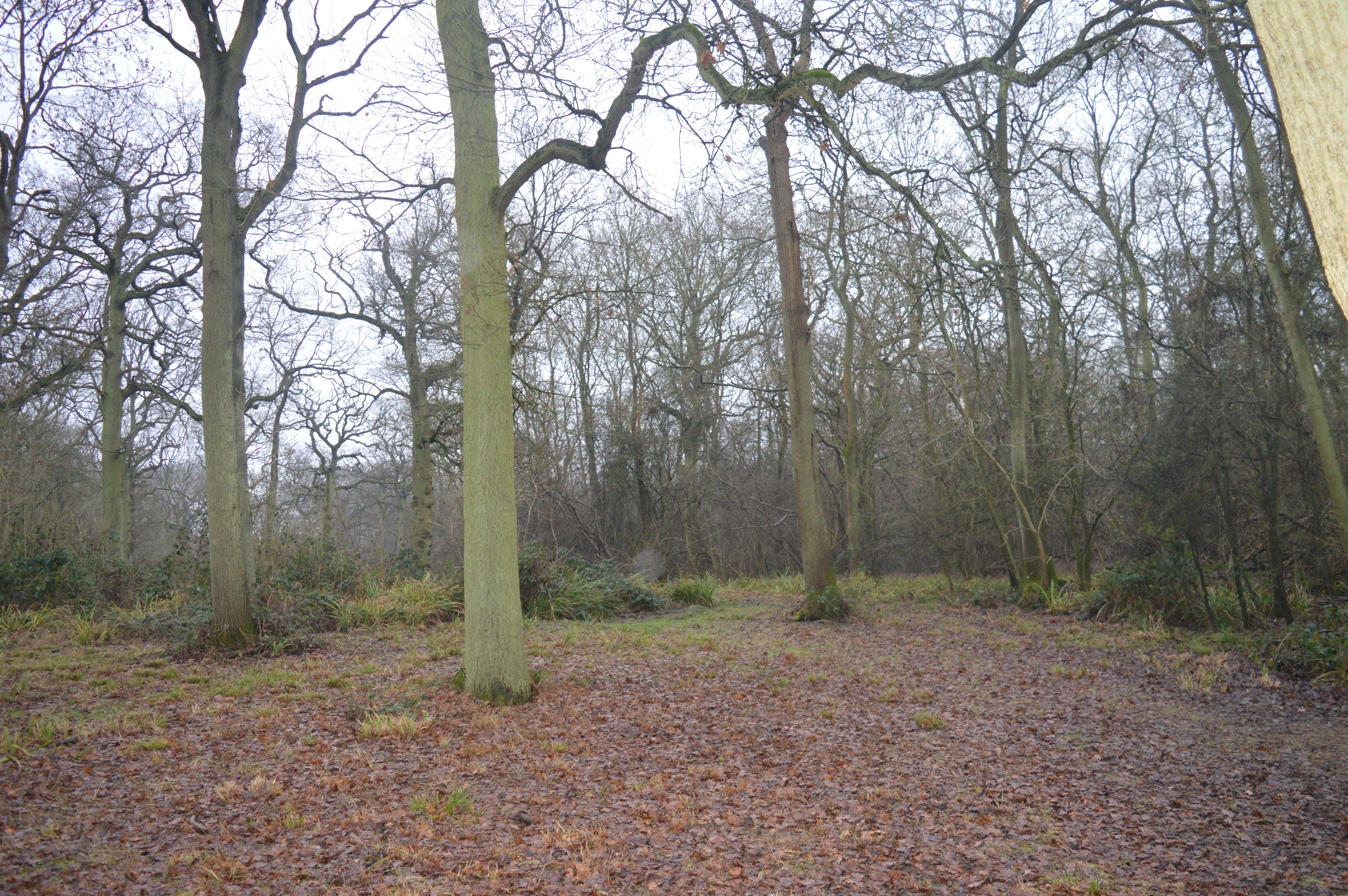
- Perry West Wood
- Location of Perry Woods.
- Area of search: Cambridgeshire
- Grid reference: TL 136 664
- Interest: Biological
- Area: 67.9 hectares
- Notification date: 1983
- Location map: Magic Map

Perry Woods is a 67.9-hectare (168-acre) biological Site of Special Scientific Interest south-east of Kimbolton in Cambridgeshire. It is composed of three woods, the larger Perry West Wood and the smaller Perry Wood and Ash Wood.

These ancient woods are of the ash/maple type, an increasingly scarce habitat over its range in lowland England. The rich ground flora includes plants indicative of ancient woodland such as wood melick and early-purple orchid. A system of rides provides valuable habitats for invertebrates.

There is access to Perry West Wood from a footpath along its northern boundary.
