= Bonemills Hollow =

UK Site of Special Scientific Interest

Coordinates: 52.599°N 0.473°W

- Site of Special Scientific Interest
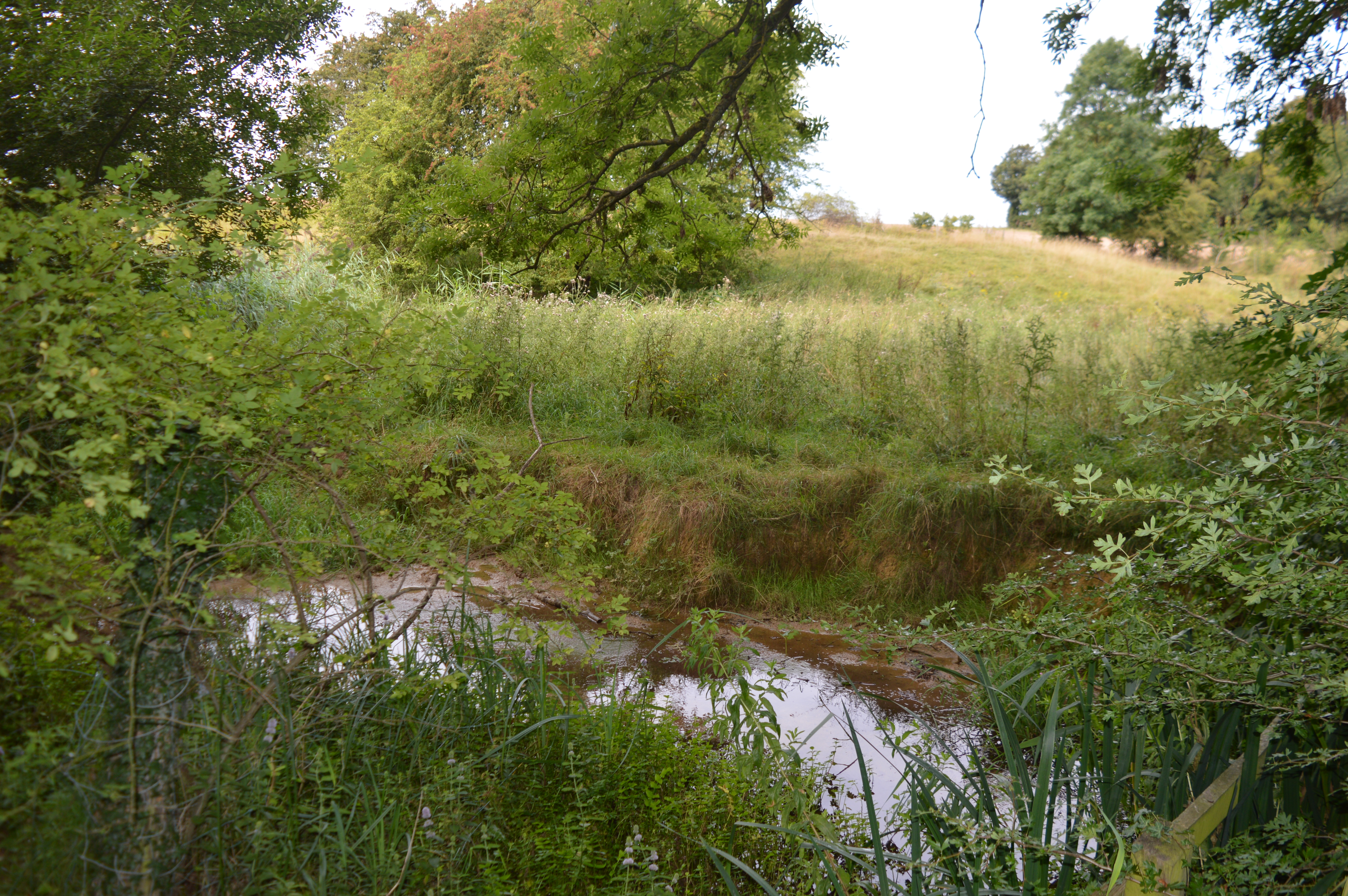
- Location of Bonemills Hollow.
- Area of search: Cambridgeshire
- Grid reference: TF 035 012
- Interest: Biological
- Area: 17.5 hectares
- Notification date: 1983
- Location map: Magic Map

Bonemills Hollow is a 17.5-hectare (43-acre) biological Site of Special Scientific Interest east of Wittering in Cambridgeshire.

The valley has marsh and Jurassic calcareous grassland areas. The marshland is on the valley floor, and dominant species are lesser pond-sedge and the rushes Juncus articulatus and Juncus inflexus. Areas of scrub and willow carr provide additional habitats for invertebrates and birds.

The site is private land with no public access.
