= Thriplow Peat Holes =

UL site of special scientific interest for its ecology

Coordinates: 52.107°N 0.116°E

- Site of Special Scientific Interest
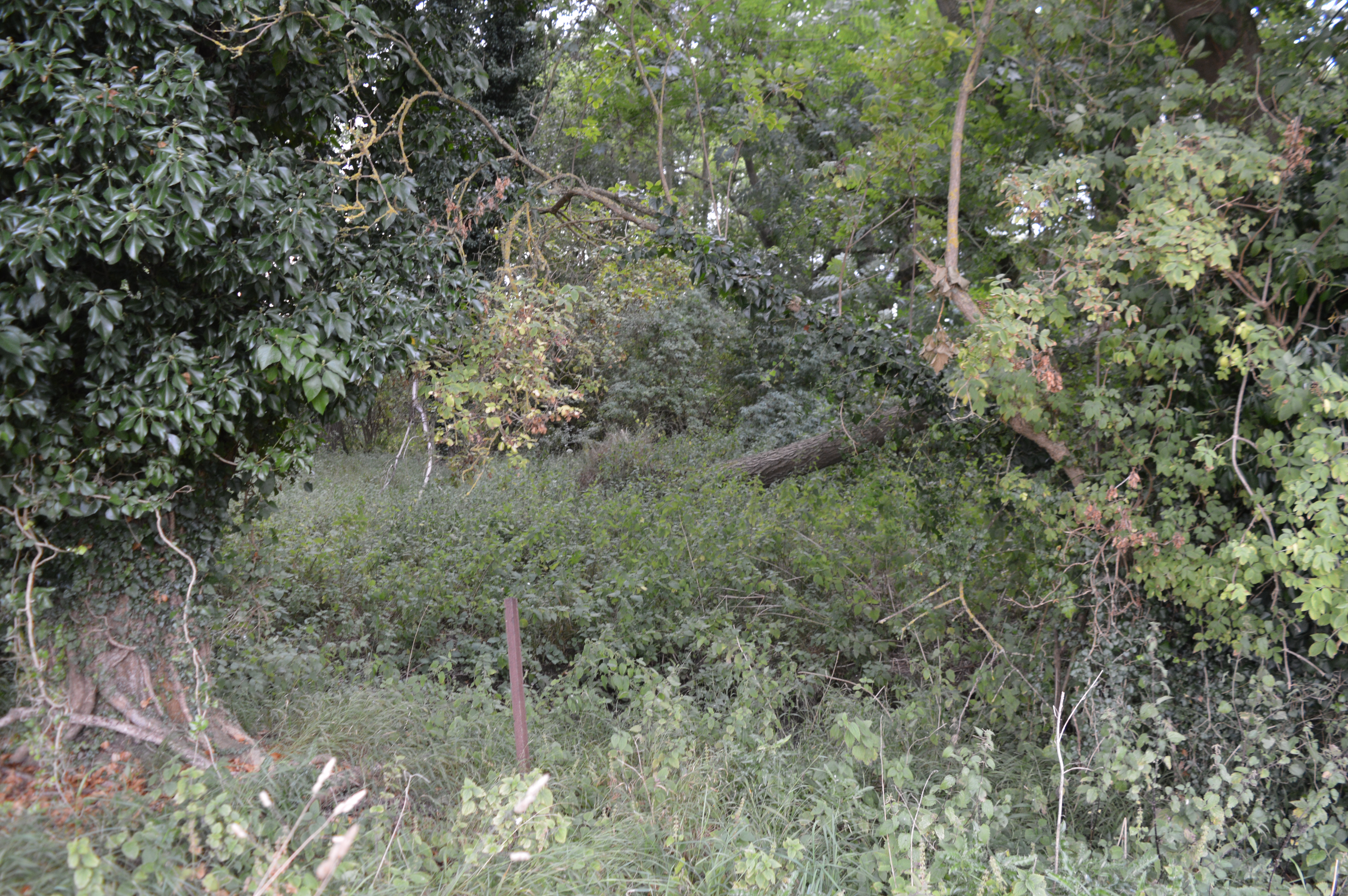
- Location of Thriplow Peat Holes.
- Area of search: Cambridgeshire
- Grid reference: TL 450 475
- Interest: Biological
- Area: 12.2 ha (30 acres)
- Notification date: 1986
- Location map: Magic Map

Thriplow Peat Holes is a 12.2-hectare (30-acre) biological Site of Special Scientific Interest north-east of Thriplow in Cambridgeshire.

The site has rare alder carr and fen habitats which have a wide variety of invertebrates, which is enhanced by ditches and ponds. The main vegetation is alder, ash, willow and guelder rose.

The site is private land with no public access.
