= Great Stukeley Railway Cutting =

Protected area in Huntingdon, Cambridgeshire, England

Coordinates: 52.358°N 0.188°W

- Site of Special Scientific Interest
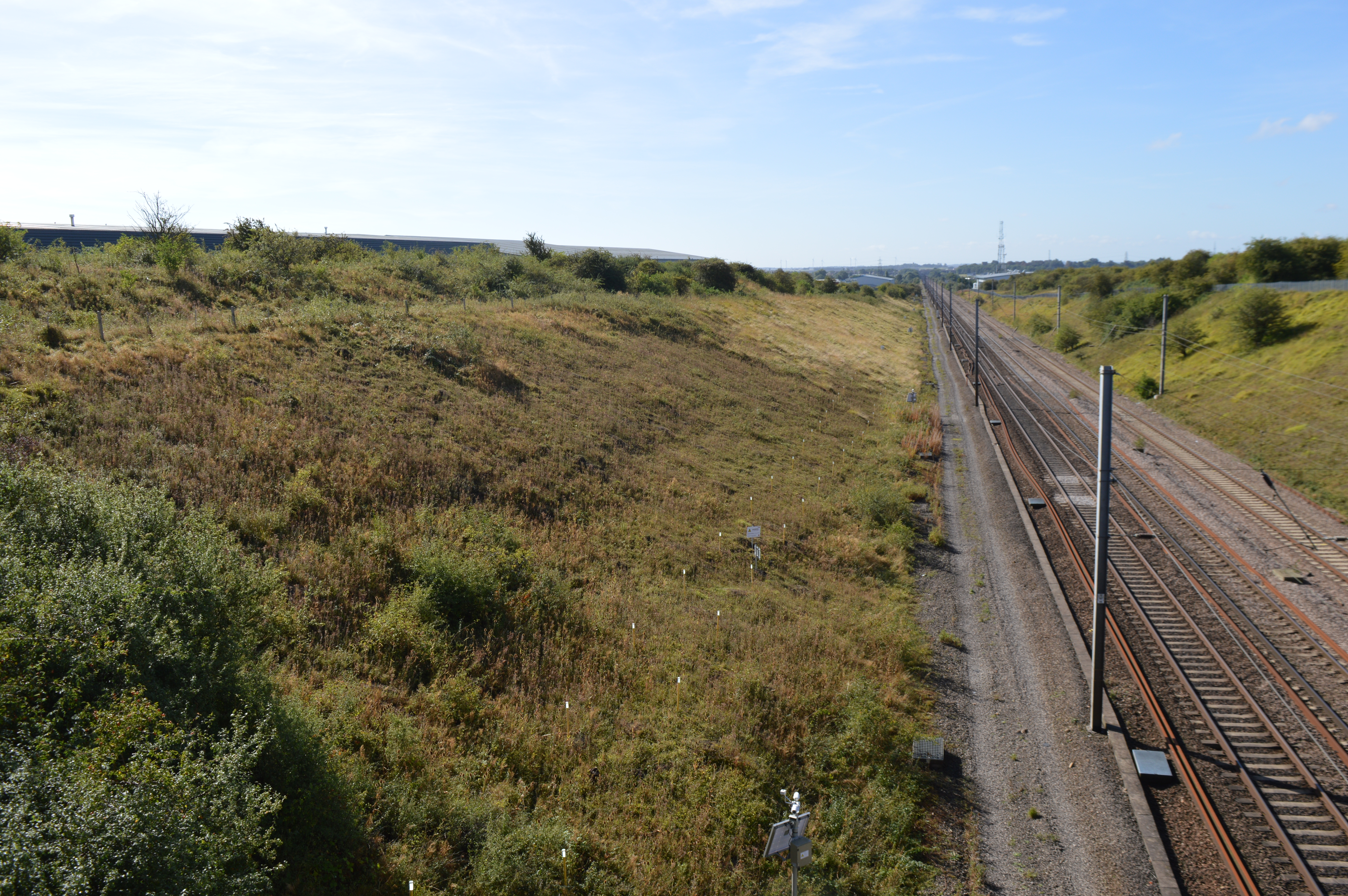
- Location of Great Stukeley Railway Cutting.
- Area of search: Cambridgeshire
- Grid reference: TL 235 748
- Interest: Biological
- Area: 34.7 hectares
- Notification date: 1986
- Location map: Magic Map

Great Stukeley Railway Cutting is a 34.7-hectare (86-acre) biological Site of Special Scientific Interest in Huntingdon in Cambridgeshire.

The site is on the verges of a stretch of the East Coast Main Line north of Huntingdon railway station. It is calcareous clay grassland which has plants which were formerly common on the Huntingdonshire claylands, but are now scarce due to agricultural use. Rabbit grazing and occasional burning maintain the habitat.

There is no public access but the site can be viewed from bridges.
