= Orton Pit =

Protected area in Peterborough, England

Coordinates: 52.532°N 0.289°W

- Site of Special Scientific Interest
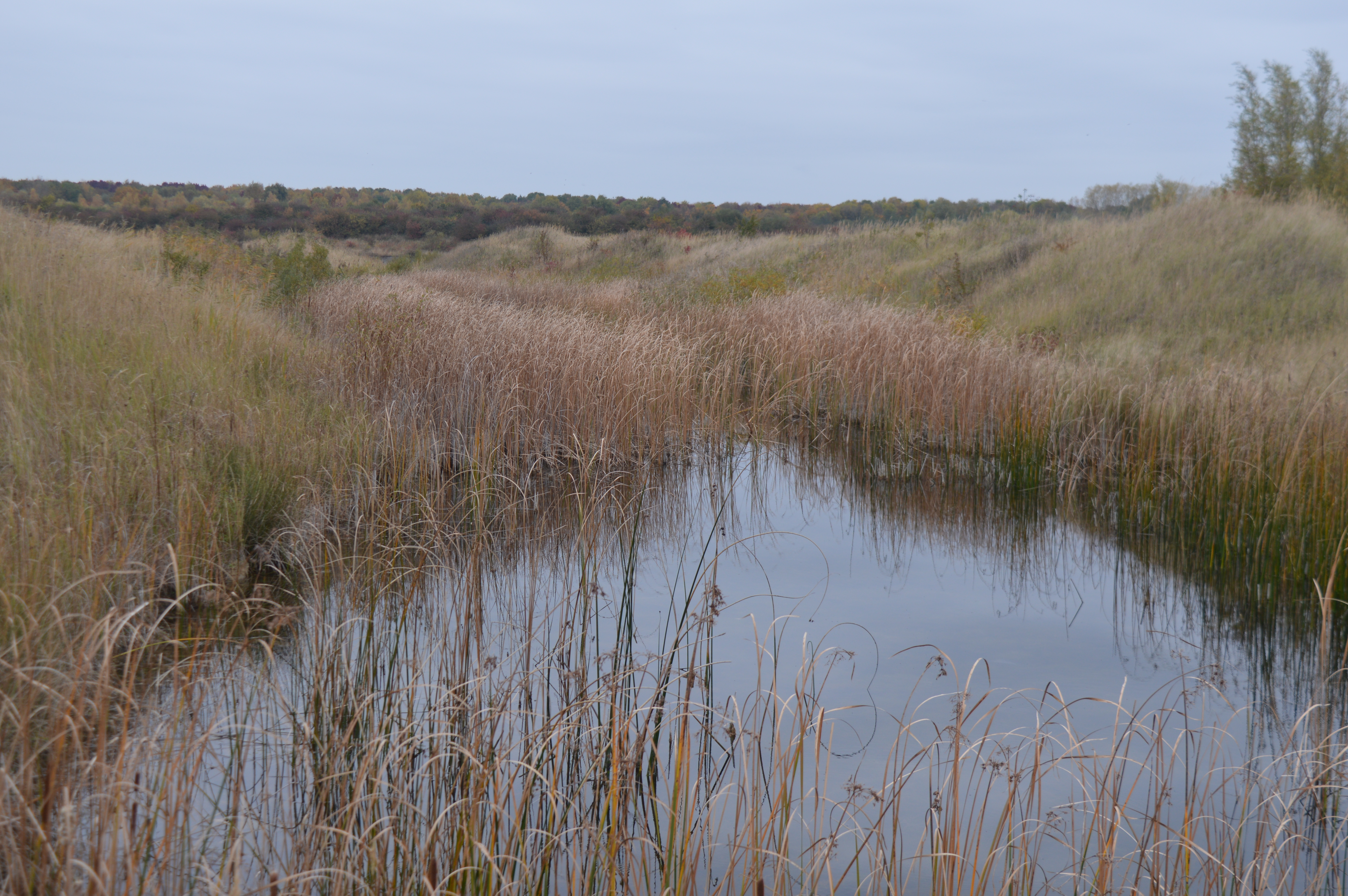
- Location of Orton Pit.
- Area of search: Cambridgeshire
- Grid reference: TL 162 941
- Interest: Biological
- Area: 145.8 hectares
- Notification date: 2004
- Location map: Magic Map

Orton Pit is a 145.8-hectare (360-acre) biological Site of Special Scientific Interest on the southern outskirts of Peterborough in Cambridgeshire. It is also a Special Area of Conservation

This extensive area of disused brick clay workings has the largest known population in Britain of great crested newts. There are ten species of stonewort, including chara canescens, which was previously thought to be extinct in Britain, and four other nationally rare species. The habitats are diverse, with ponds, scrub and rough grassland.

The site is private land with no public access, apart from a small wood in the north-east corner, north of Guelder Road and Ewood Drive.
