= Warboys Clay Pit =

Protected area in Cambridgeshire, England

Coordinates: 52.419°N 0.08°W

- Site of Special Scientific Interest
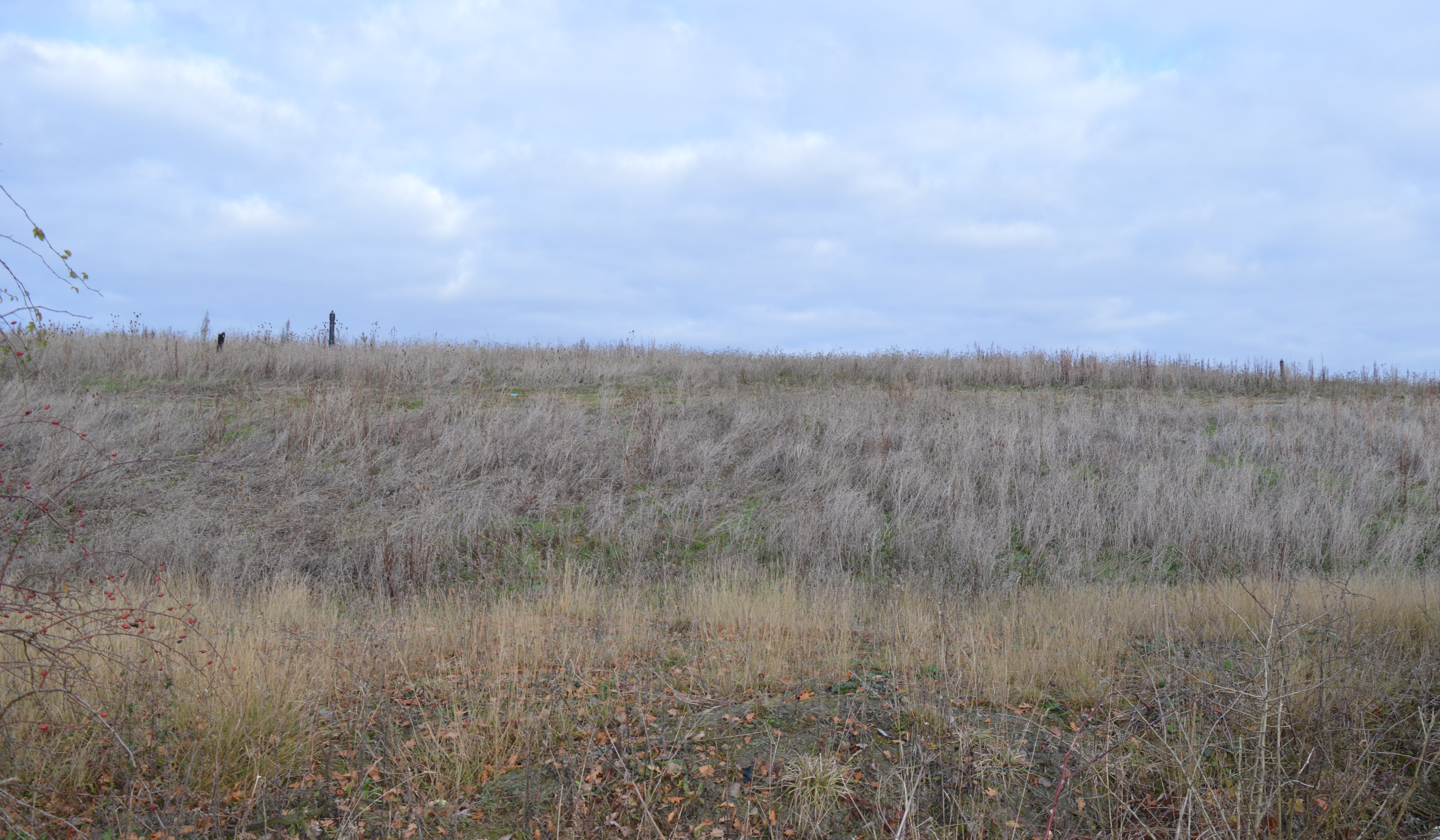
- Location of Warboys Clay Pit.
- Area of search: Cambridgeshire
- Grid reference: TL 307 818
- Interest: Geological
- Area: 12.6 hectares
- Notification date: 1984
- Location map: Magic Map

Warboys Clay Pit is a 12.6-hectare (31-acre) geological Site of Special Scientific Interest west of Warboys in Cambridgeshire. It is a Geological Conservation Review site.

According to Natural England this "unrivalled Oxfordian section shows more than 20 metres of Upper Oxford Clay". It has ammonite fossils dating to the Late Jurassic, around 160 million years ago.

The site is private land with no public access.
