= Brampton Meadow =

Protected area in Cambridgeshire, England

Coordinates: 52.333°N 0.252°W

- Site of Special Scientific Interest
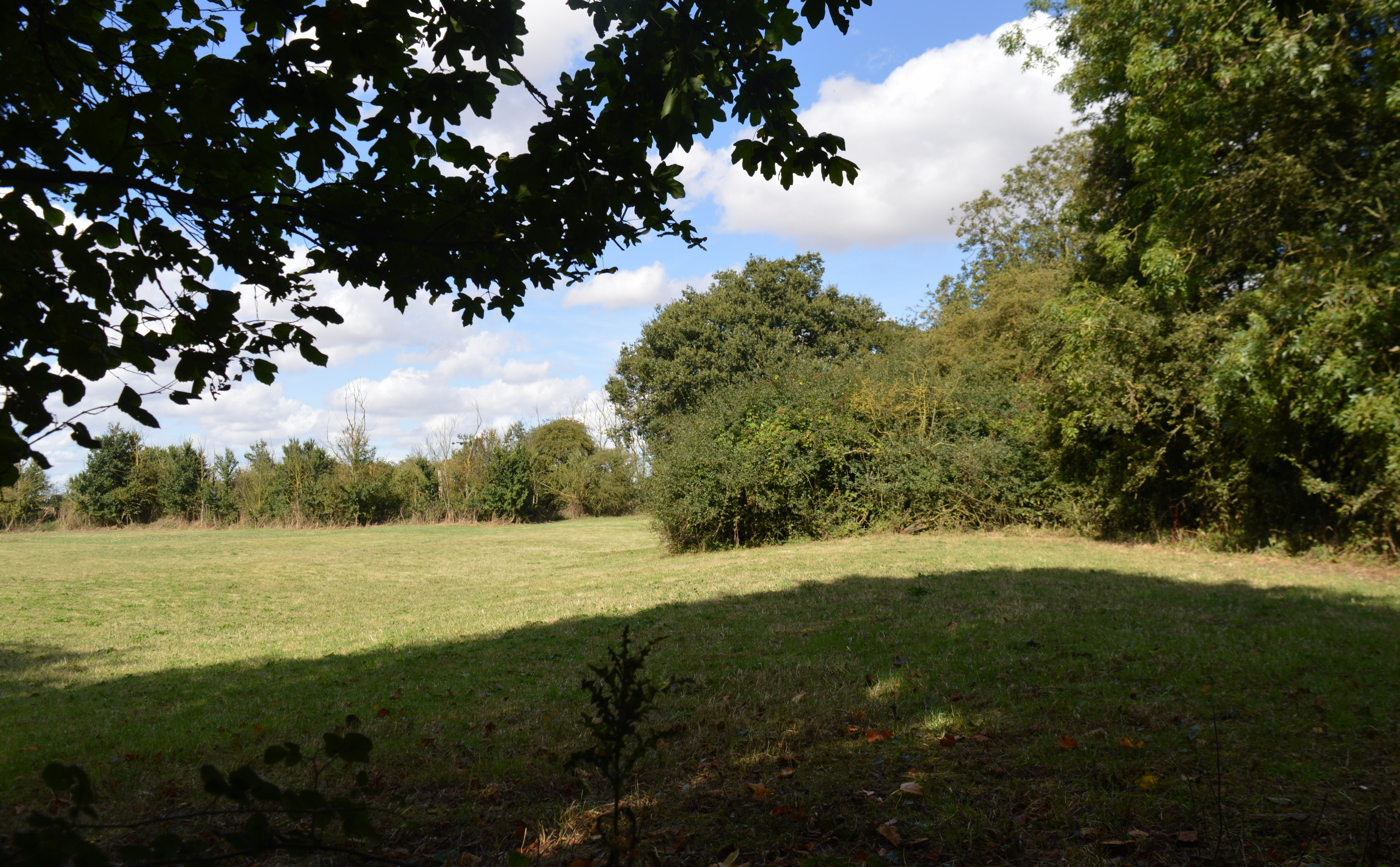
- Location of Brampton Meadow.
- Area of search: Cambridgeshire
- Grid reference: TL 192 720
- Interest: Biological
- Area: 0.95 hectares
- Notification date: 1986
- Location map: Magic Map

Brampton Meadow is a one hectare biological Site of Special Scientific Interest north-west of Brampton in Cambridgeshire, England.

The site has a rich variety of plant species on calcareous clay pasture, a declining habitat. Plants include quaking-grass, adder's tongue fern, cowslip and green-winged orchid.

The site is on private land with no public access.
