= Histon Road SSSI =

Protected area in Cambridgeshire, England

Coordinates: 52.229°N 0.112°E

Histon Road
- Site of Special Scientific Interest
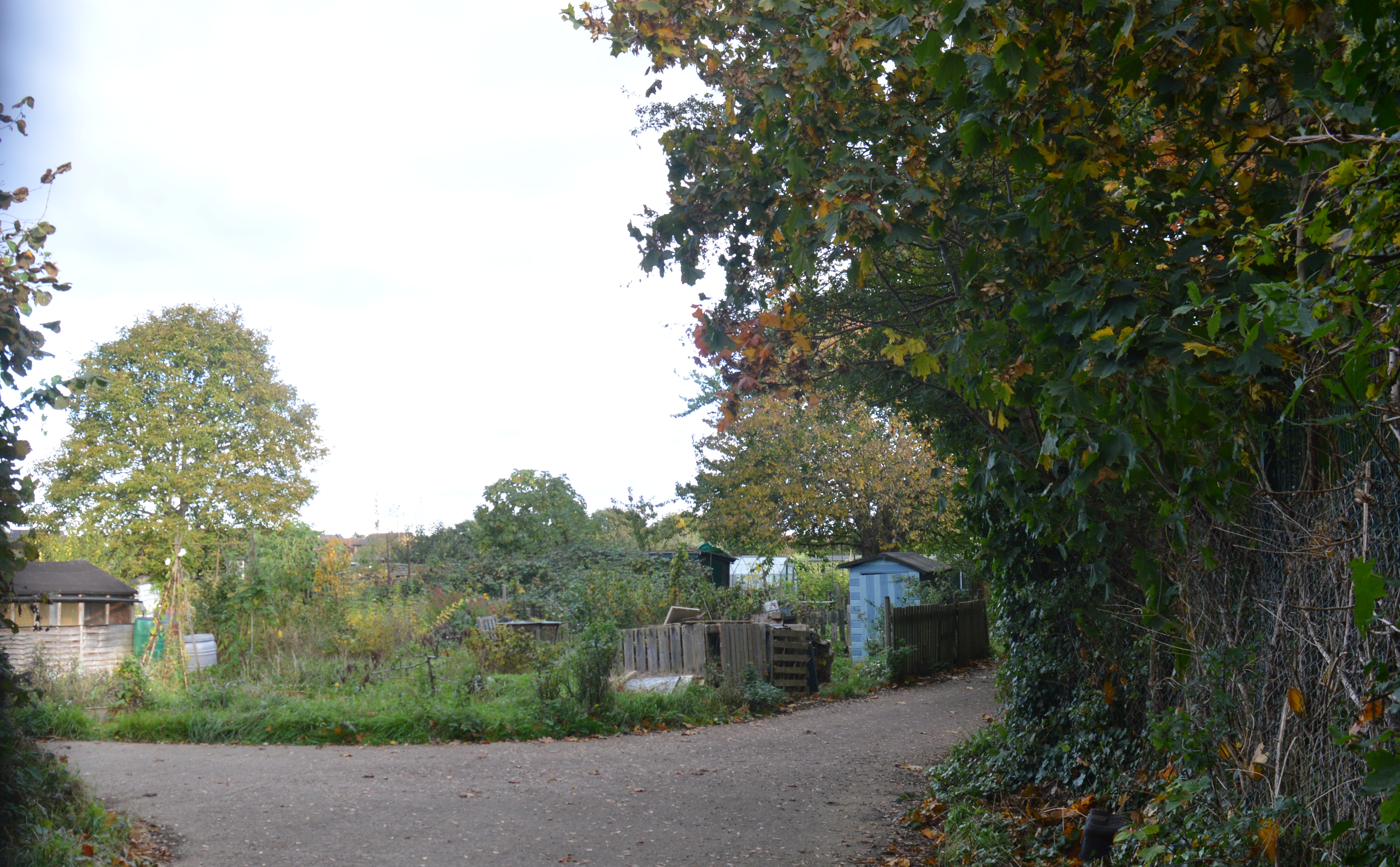
- Location of Histon Road.
- Area of search: Cambridgeshire
- Grid reference: TL 443 611
- Interest: Geological
- Area: 0.6 hectares
- Notification date: 1984
- Location map: Magic Map

Histon Road is a 0.6-hectare (1.5-acre) geological Site of Special Scientific Interest in Cambridge. It is a Geological Conservation Review site.

Histon Road is described by Natural England as a "key Pleistocene stratigraphic site". It is one of only two sites in East Anglia which has an almost complete sequence of the second half of the warm Eemian interglacial, around 120,000 years ago. There are many deposits of molluscs and pollen.

The site has been filled in and is now allotments. There is no public access.
