= St Neots Common =

Protected area in Cambridgeshire, England

Coordinates: 52.236°N 0.271°W

- Site of Special Scientific Interest
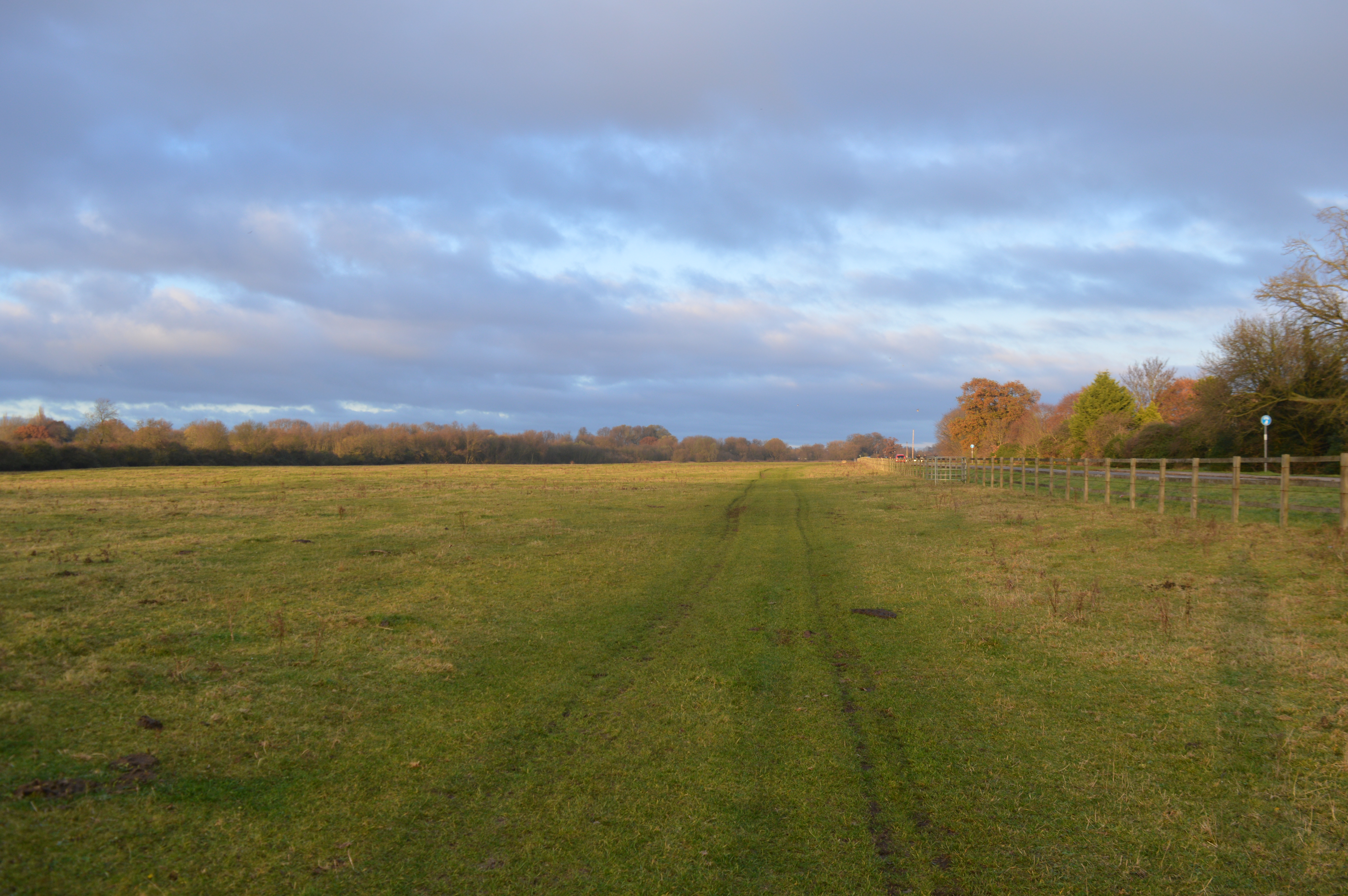
- Location of St Neots Common.
- Area of search: Cambridgeshire
- Grid reference: TL 182 612
- Interest: Biological
- Area: 33.4 hectares
- Notification date: 1983
- Location map: Magic Map

St Neots Common is a 33.4-hectare (83-acre) biological Site of Special Scientific Interest in St Neots in Cambridgeshire.

This site on the east bank of the River Great Ouse has grassland, willow carr, ditches and ponds, which support diverse wildlife species. The grassland is traditionally maintained by grazing, and herbs in wetter areas include marsh orchids and marsh arrow grass.

There is access to the site from the road called The Common.
