= Elsworth Wood =

Protected area in Cambridgeshire, England

Coordinates: 52.239°N 0.080°W

- Site of Special Scientific Interest
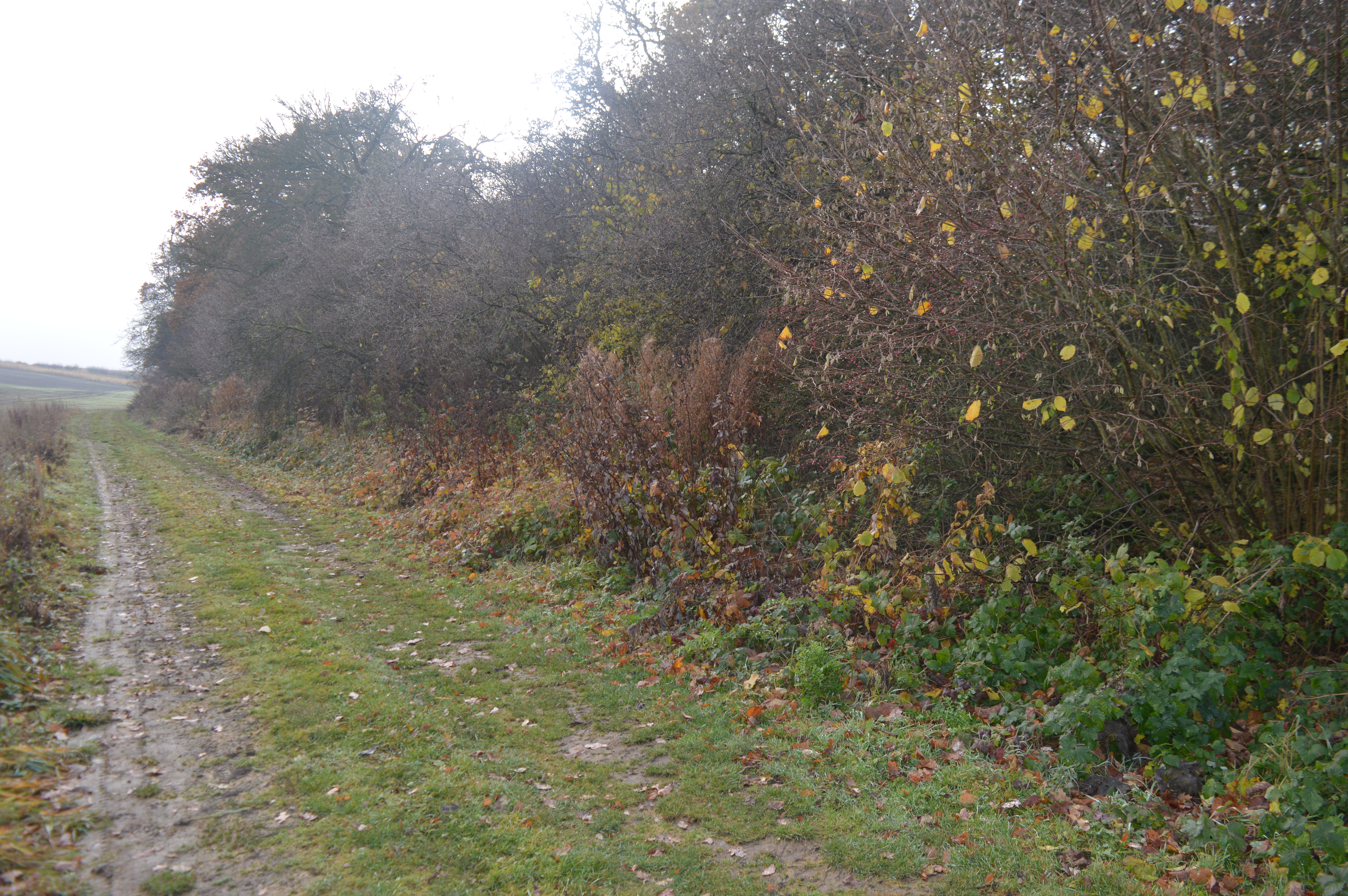
- Location of Elsworth Wood.
- Area of search: Cambridgeshire
- Grid reference: TL 312 618
- Interest: Biological
- Area: 6.9 hectares
- Notification date: 1986
- Location map: Magic Map

Elsworth Wood is a 6.9-hectare (17-acre) biological Site of Special Scientific Interest between Cambourne and Elsworth in Cambridgeshire.

This site has three different uncommon types of woodland. It is mainly coppiced field maple, with a varied shrub layer and the ground flora is mainly dog's mercury and bluebells, together with a considerable population of oxlips. There are several nationally uncommon beetles, such as the rove beetle Stichoglossa semirufa.

The site is private land with no public access.
