= West, Abbot's and Lound Woods =

Site of Special Scientific Interest

Coordinates: 52.596°N 0.438°W

- Site of Special Scientific Interest
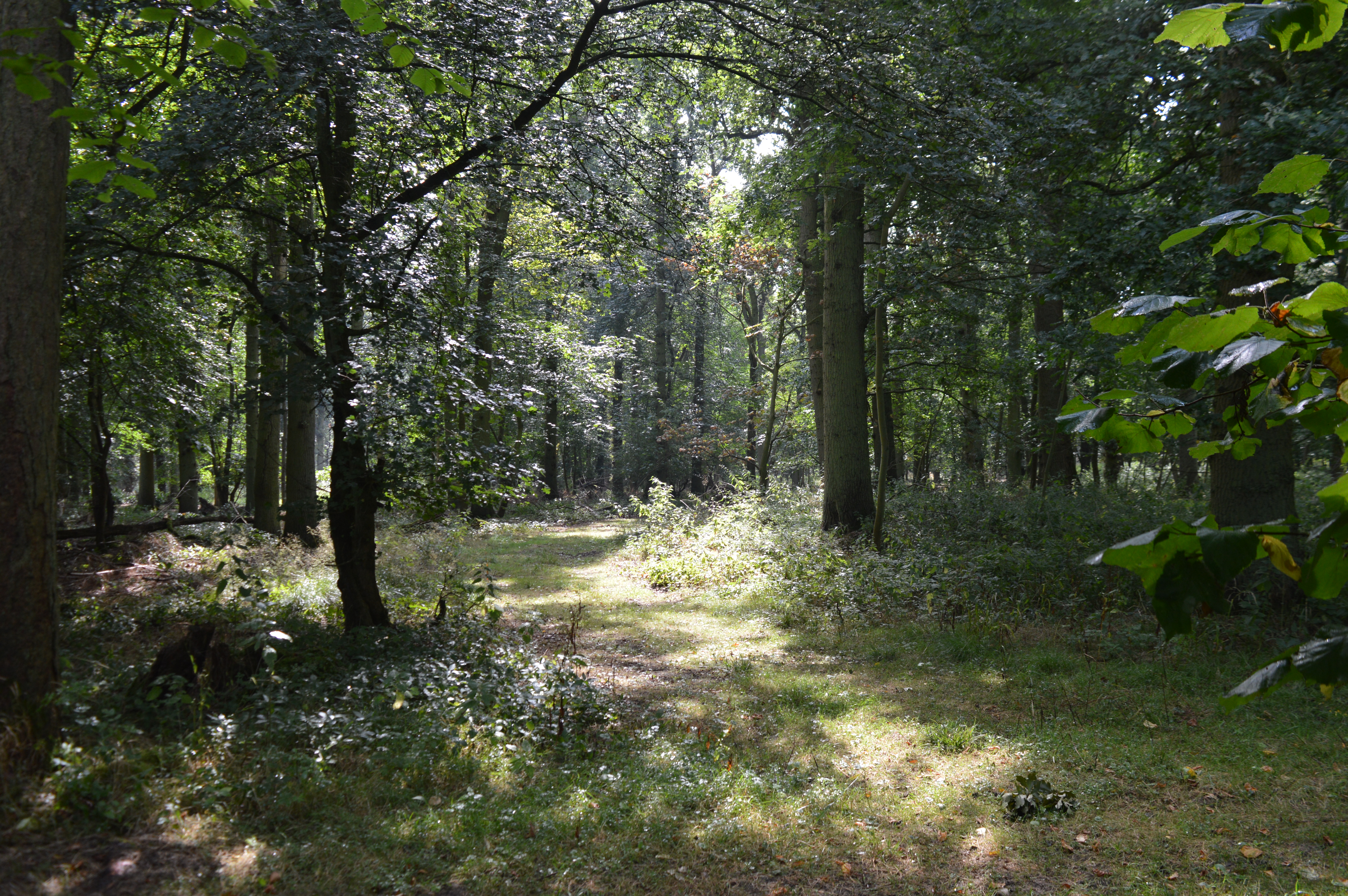
- Location of West, Abbot's and Lound Woods.
- Area of search: Cambridgeshire
- Grid reference: TF 059 010
- Interest: Biological
- Area: 50.4 hectares
- Notification date: 1987
- Location map: Magic Map

West, Abbot's and Lound Woods is a 50.4-hectare (125-acre) biological Site of Special Scientific Interest south of Wittering in Cambridgeshire.

The site has a variety of woodland types, some of which are rare in Britain, including plateau alderwood. There are ancient woodland plants such as yellow archangel and toothwort.

The site is private land with no public access.
