= Adventurers' Land =

Geological Site of Special Scientific Interest north of March in Cambridgeshire

Coordinates: 52.598°N 0.008°E

- Site of Special Scientific Interest
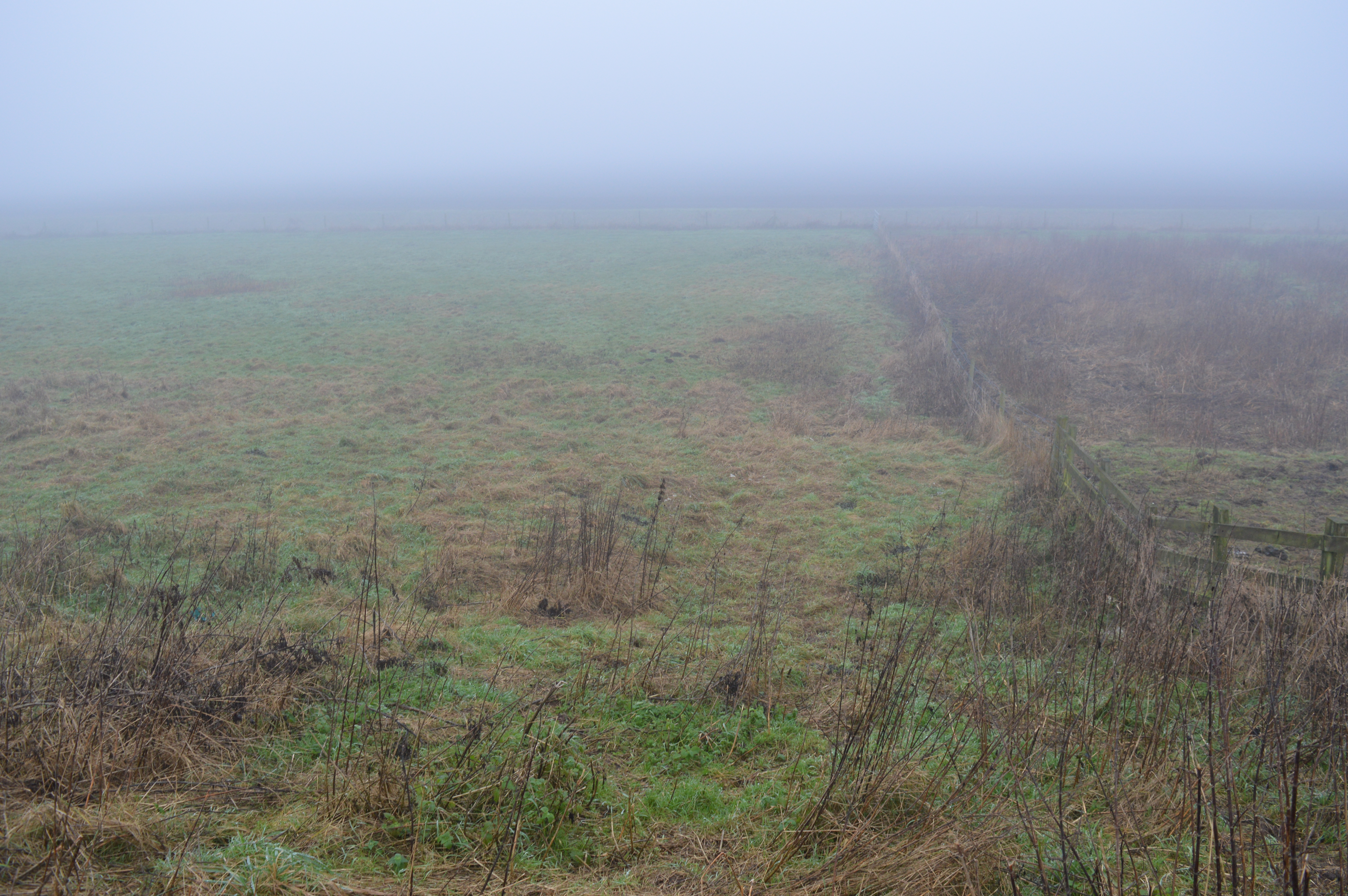
- Site in 2016
- Location of Adventurers' Land.
- Area of search: Cambridgeshire
- Grid reference: TF 361 019
- Interest: Geological
- Area: 10.1 hectares
- Notification date: 1989
- Location map: Magic Map

Adventurers' Land is a 10.1-hectare (25-acre) geological Site of Special Scientific Interest (SSSI) north of March in Cambridgeshire. It is a Geological Conservation Review site.

The site is described by Natural England as important for the study of changes in Holocene sea levels. There are five peat levels dating to between 6,400 and 1,850 years BP, and the earliest represents the oldest directly dated transgression of the sea into the Fens. Part of the site is also in the Nene Washes biological SSSI.

A public footpath along the north bank of the River Nene from Guyhirn goes through the site, which has been filled in and no geology is visible.
