= Castor Flood Meadows =

Protected area in Peterborough, England

Coordinates: 52.562°N 0.345°W

- Site of Special Scientific Interest
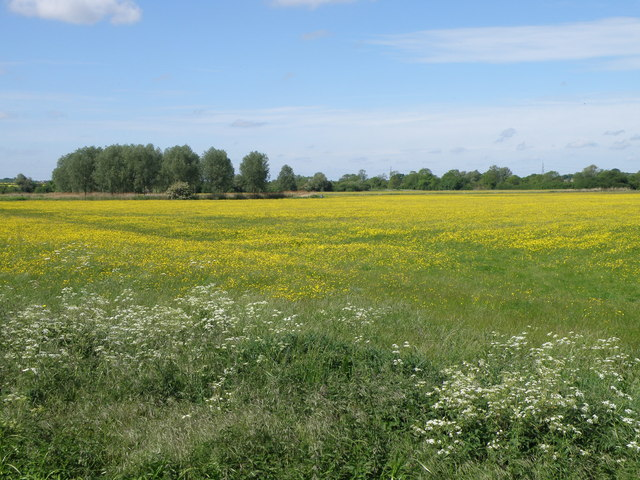
- Location of Castor Flood Meadows.
- Area of search: Cambridgeshire
- Grid reference: TL 123 972
- Interest: Biological
- Area: 41.8 hectares
- Notification date: 1986
- Location map: Magic Map

Castor Flood Meadows is a 41.8-hectare (103-acre) biological Site of Special Scientific Interest on the western outskirts of Peterborough in Cambridgeshire.

This site on the banks of the River Nene is a remnant of formerly extensive flood meadows. Flora include slender tufted-sedges, early marsh-orchids and the nationally restricted narrow-leaved water-dropwort.

The Hereward Way long distance footpath goes through the site.
