= Sutton Heath and Bog =

Protected area in Cambridgeshire, England

Coordinates: 52.587°N 0.394°W

- Site of Special Scientific Interest
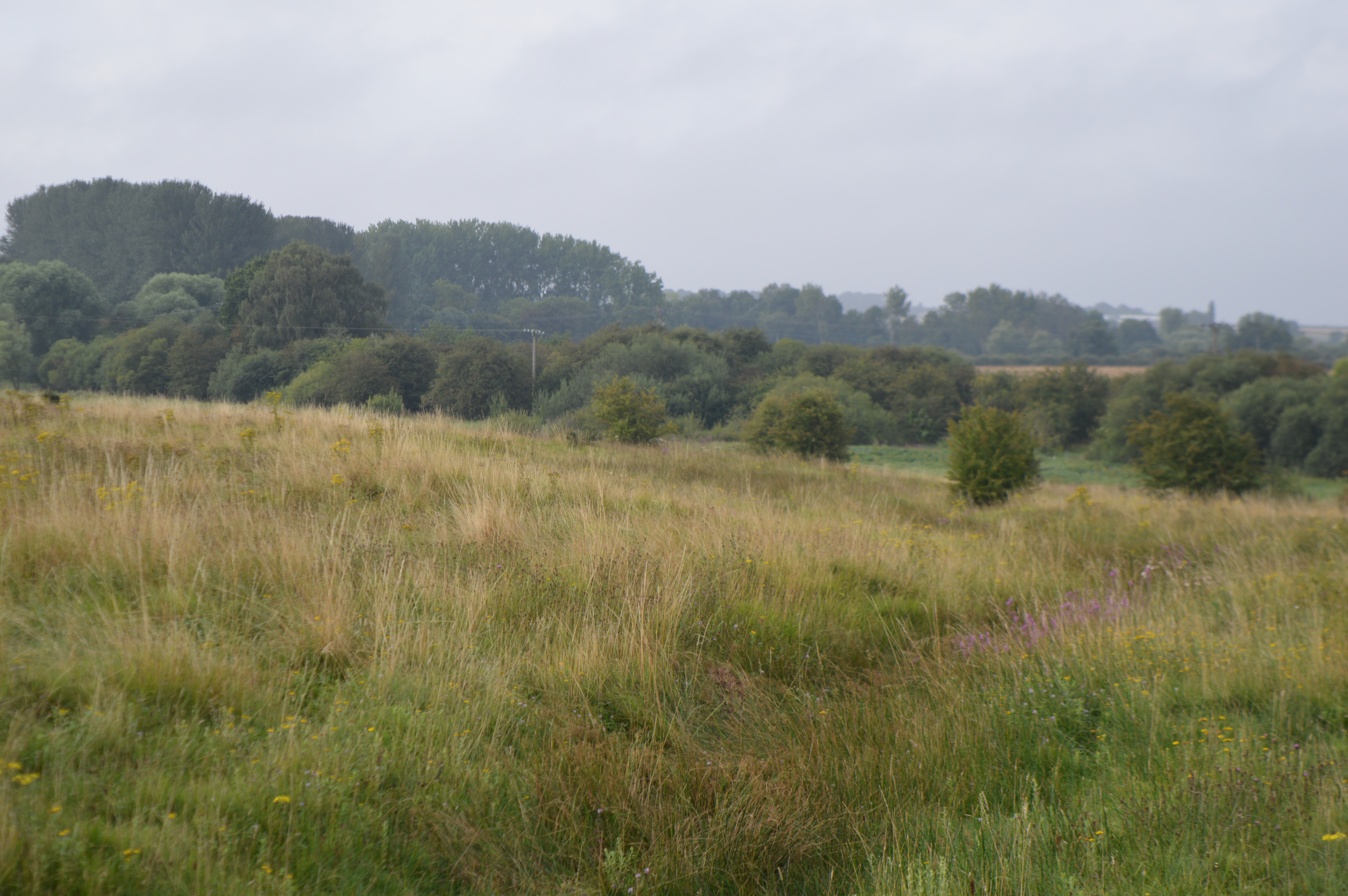
- Location of Sutton Heath and Bog.
- Area of search: Cambridgeshire
- Grid reference: TF 089 000
- Interest: Biological
- Area: 18.3 hectares
- Notification date: 1983
- Location map: Magic Map

Sutton Heath and Bog is an 18.3-hectare (45-acre) biological Site of Special Scientific Interest east of Wansford in Cambridgeshire.

This site has two types of grassland, both of which are rare in Cambridgeshire. They are calcareous grassland on Jurassic limestone and base-poor marshy neutral grassland. The base poor areas have a diverse variety of plant species, including some which are locally uncommon.

The site is private land but a public footpath runs through the northern end.
