= Wilbraham Fens =

Protected area in Cambridgeshire, England

Coordinates: 52.209°N 0.222°E

- Site of Special Scientific Interest
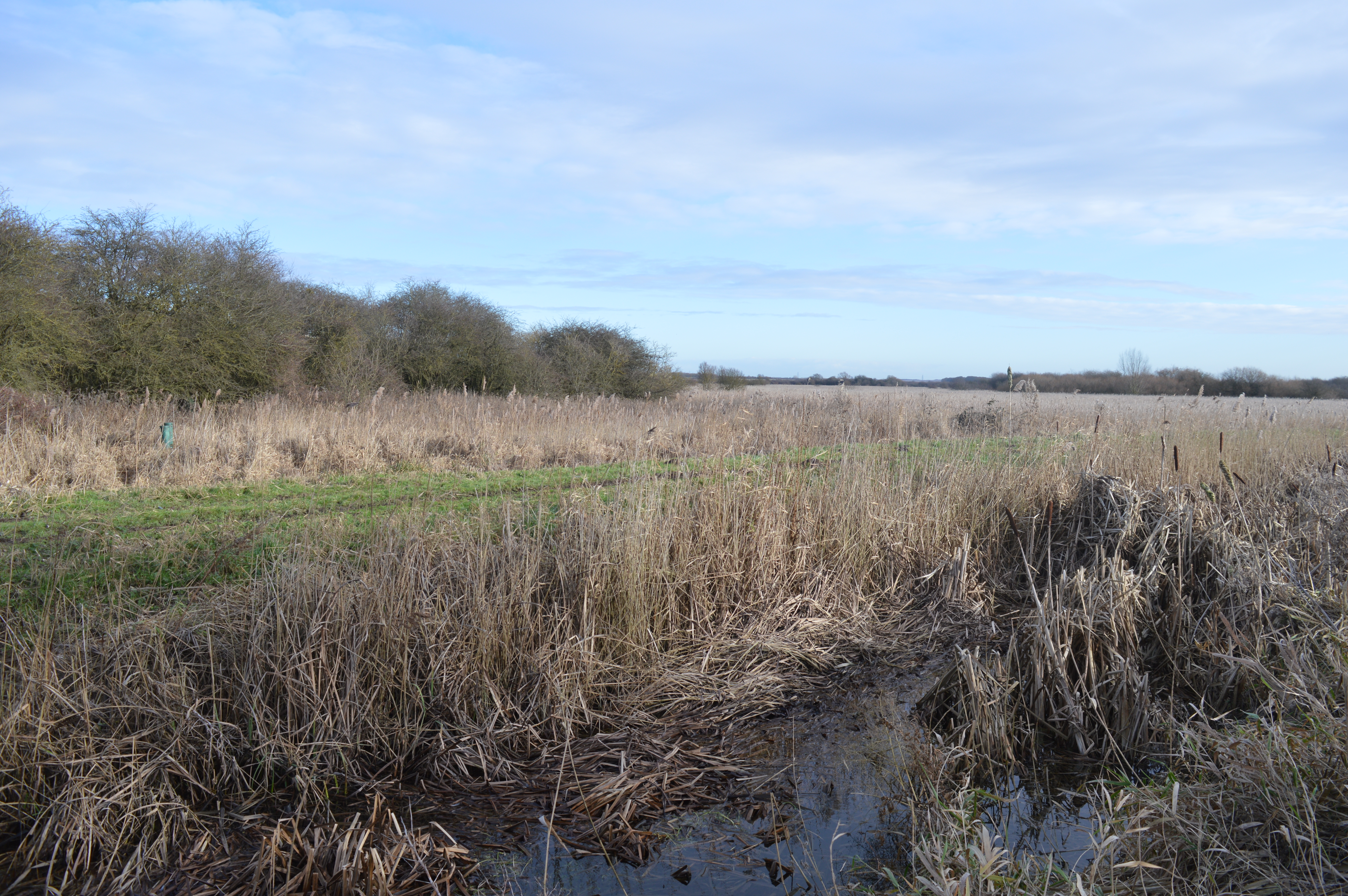
- Location of Wilbraham Fens.
- Area of search: Cambridgeshire
- Grid reference: TL 519 591
- Interest: Biological
- Area: 62.0 hectares
- Notification date: 1985
- Location map: Magic Map

Wilbraham Fens is a 62.5-hectare (154-acre) biological Site of Special Scientific Interest east of Cambridge.

This is an example of a fen habitat, which is now rare in Britain, with grassland, scrub, ponds and ditches. The dominant fen species is common reed, which is present in dense stands, together with plants such as purple loosestrife and meadow rue. Herbs include harebell and field scabious.

There is no public access but the site can be viewed from footpaths.
