= Upware Bridge Pit North =

Protected area in Cambridgeshire, England

Coordinates: 52.329°N 0.263°E

- Site of Special Scientific Interest
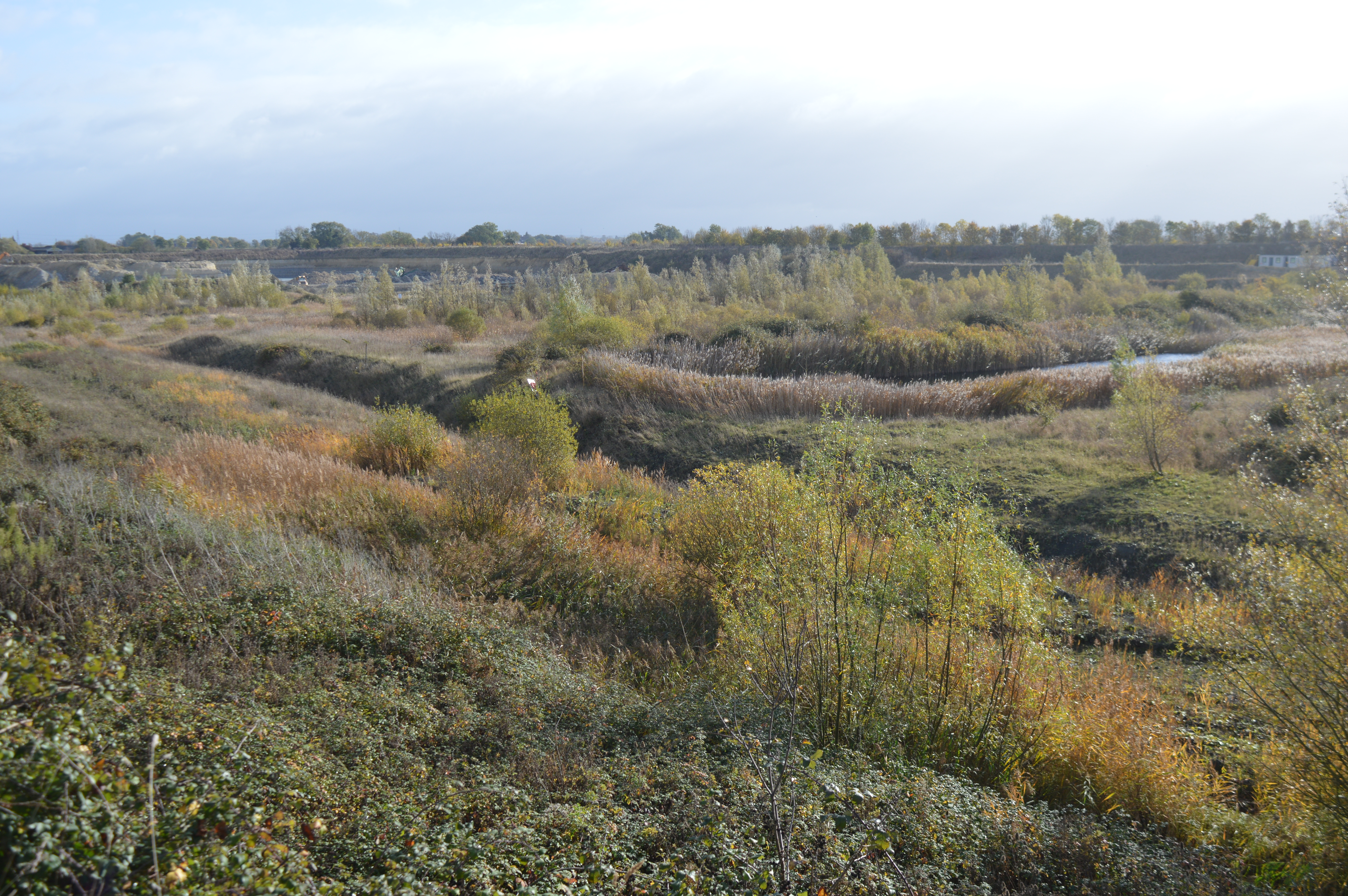
- Location of Upware Bridge Pit North.
- Area of search: Cambridgeshire
- Grid reference: TL 543 724
- Interest: Geological
- Area: 2.5 hectares
- Notification date: 1987
- Location map: Magic Map

Upware Bridge Pit North is a 2.5-hectare (6.2-acre) geological Site of Special Scientific Interest northwest of Wicken in Cambridgeshire. It is a Geological Conservation Review site.

This site shows exposes rocks of Oxfordian age, around 160 million years old, formed when the area was in a sea connected to the Tethys Ocean; it has many Tethyan invertebrate fossils. It is described by Natural England as "an essential site for the study of Oxfordian palaeontology and palaeogeography in the English midlands".

The site is a working quarry. There is no public access, but there is a viewing platform. The Fen Rivers Way passes the site.
