= Cam Washes =

Protected area in Cambridgeshire, England

Coordinates: 52.317°N 0.252°E

- Site of Special Scientific Interest
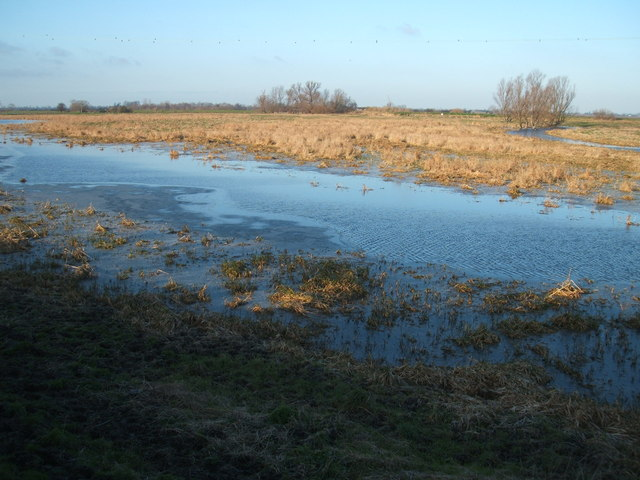
- Location of Cam Washes.
- Area of search: Cambridgeshire
- Grid reference: TL 536 712
- Interest: Biological
- Area: 166.5 hectares
- Notification date: 1986
- Location map: Magic Map

Cam Washes is a 166.5-hectare (411-acre) biological Site of Special Scientific Interest west of Wicken in Cambridgeshire.

This site on the banks of the River Cam is composed of pastures which are seasonally flooded. It is described by Natural England as an important site for wintering and breeding wildfowl and waders. Breeding birds include snipe, common redshank, gadwall, Eurasian teal and northern shoveler.

There is access from the Fen Rivers Way, which goes through the site.
