= List of Nature Conservation Review sites =

The following is a 'list of British conservation sites listed in Derek Ratcliffe's 1979 book A Nature Conservation Review, the two-volume work which set out to identify the most important places for nature conservation in Great Britain.

The following headings, subheadings, site codes and site names are the same as those used in the original work.

== Coastlands ==
=== Southeast England ===
Site code	Site name	County	Subsites
C.1	Cuckmere Haven - Beachy Head	Sussex	
C.2	Folkestone Warren	Kent	
C.3	Dungeness	Kent	
C.4	Sandwich / Pegwell Bay	Kent	
C.5	Chichester / Langstone Harbours	Sussex, Hampshire	(a) Chichester Harbour (b) Langstone Harbour
C.6	The Swales (Isle of Sheppey)	Kent	
C.7	Burntwick Island / Chetney Marshes (Medway Marshes)	Kent	
C.8	High Halstow / Cliffe Marshes	Kent	
C.9	Allhallows Marshes / Yantlet Creek	Kent	

=== South England ===
Site code	Site name	County	Subsites
C.10	Needles - St Catherine's Point	Isle of Wight, Hampshire	
C.11	North Solent Marshes	Hampshire	
C.12	Newtown Harbour	Isle of Wight, Hampshire	

=== East Anglia ===
Site code	Site name	County	Subsites
C.13	Foulness and Maplin Sands	Essex	
C.14	Blackwater Flats and Marshes	Essex	(a) Dengie Peninsula (b) Blackwater Estuary (c) Colne Estuary
C.15	Hamford Water	Essex	
C.16	Stour Estuary	Essex	
C.17	Orfordness / Havergate Island	Suffolk	
C.18	Winterton Dunes	Norfolk	
C.19	North Norfolk Coast	Norfolk	(a) Holme - Brancaster (b) Scolt Head Island (c) Overy - Holkham (d) Wells - Morston (e) Blakeney Point (f) Cley - Salthouse
C.20	The Wash Flats and Marshes	Norfolk - Lincolnshire	(a) Gibraltar Point - Wrangle (b) Wrangle - Welland (c) Welland - Nene (d) Nene - Ouse (e) Ouse - Hunstanton
C.21	Saltfleetby - Theddlethorpe Dunes	Lincolnshire	
C.22	Leigh Marsh	Essex	

=== South-west England ===
- C.23 Poole Harbour, Dorset
- C.24 Durlston Head – Ringstead Bay, Dorset
- C.25 Chesil Beach / The Fleet, Dorset
- C.26 Axmouth – Lyme Regis Undercliffs, Devon
- C.27 The Lizard, Cornwall
- C.28 Isles of Scilly
- C.29 Cape Cornwall – Clodgy Point, Cornwall
- C.30 Godrevy Point – St. Agnes, Cornwall
- C.31 Boscastle to Widemouth, Cornwall
- C.32 Steeple Point – Blackchurch Rock, Cornwall – Devon
- C.33 Braunton Burrows, Devon
- C.34 Bridgwater Bay, Somerset
- C.35 New Grounds, Slimbridge, Gloucestershire
- C.36 Exe Estuary, Devon
- C.37 Lynher Estuary and St. John's Lake, Cornwall
- C.38 Fal-Ruan Estuary, Cornwall
- C.39 Porthgwarra – Pordenack Point, Cornwall
- C.40 Severn Estuary: Aber Hafren, Somerset – Gloucestershire – Monmouthshire

=== South Wales ===
- C.41 South Gower Coast

(a) Worms Head - Porteynon Point
(b) Oxwich Point - Crawley Cliff
(c) Pwll-du Head - Bishopston Valley

- C.42 Burry Inlet, Glamorgan
- C.43 Stackpole Head - Castlemartin Cliffs: Stacpol - Clogwyni Castell Martyn, Pembrokeshire
- C.44 Strumble Head: Pen Caer-Llechdafad, Pembrokeshire
- C.45 Ynysoedd Preseli, Pembrokeshire

(a) Skokholm
(b) Skomer
(c) Grassholm
(d) Ramsey: Ynys Dewi

- C.46 Dyfi, Cardiganshire - Merioneth - Montgomeryshire
- C.47 Kenfig Dunes: Tywyn Cynffig, Glamorgan
- C.48 Tywyn Gwendraeth: Towyn Burrows, Carmarthenshire
- C.49 St David's Head: Penmaendewi, Pembrokeshire

=== North Wales ===
- C.50 Glannau Harlech, Merioneth

(a) Morfa Harlech and Traeth Bach
(b) Morfa Dyffryn

- C.51 Newborough Warren - Ynys Llanddwyn, Anglesey
- C.52 Glannau Ynys Gybi: Holy Island Coast, Anglesey
- C.53 Ynys Enlli & Glannau Aberdaron: Bardsey Island and Aberdaron Coast, Caernarvonshire
- C.54 Tywyn Aberffraw, Anglesey

=== Midlands ===
- C.55 Dee Estuary: Aber Dyfrdwy, Cheshire - Flintshire
- C.56 Mersey Estuary, Cheshire - Lancashire

=== North England ===
- C.57 Ainsdale Dunes, Lancashire
- C.58 Ribble Estuary, Lancashire
- C.59 Morecambe Bay (including Wyre-Lune), Lancashire
- C.60 Walney and Sandscale Dunes, Lancashire
- C.61 Upper Solway Flats and Marshes, Cumberland, Dunfries-shire, Kirdcudbrightshire

(a) Sarkfoot - Bowness shore, Sarkfoot - Dornock shore
(b) Grune Point - Bowness shore, Powfoot - Dornock shore
(c) Lochar - Nith shore

- C.62 Humber Flats and Marshes, Yorkshire - Lincolnshire

(a) Upper Humber Flats (Hull - Trent mouth)
(b) Lower Humber Flats (Hull - Spurn)

- C.63 Bempton / Speeton Cliffs, Yorkshire
- C.64 Farne Islands, Northumberland
- C.65 Lindisfarne - Ross Links - Budle Bay, Northumberland
- C.66 Duddon Sands, Lancashire - Cumberland
- C.67 Drigg Point, Cumberland
- C.68 Beast Cliff / Robin Hood's Bay, Yorkshire
- C.69 Teesmouth Flats and Marshes, Yorkshire - Durham
- C.70 Hart Warren - Hawthorn Dene Coast, Durham
- C.71 Coquet Island, Northumberland

=== South Scotland ===
- C.72 Torrs Warren, Wigtownshire
- C.73 Mull of Galloway - Crammag Head, Wigtownshire
- C.74 Ailsa Craig, Ayrshire
- C.75 St Abb's Head, Berwickshire
- C.76 Firth of Forth, Fife, Stirlingshire, Mid-, East and West Lothian
- C.77 Borgue Coast, Kirkcudbrightshire
- C.78 Wigtown Bay, Kirkcudbrightshire - Wigtownshire
- C.79 Bass Rock, East Lothian
- C.80 Forth Islands, East and Midlothian

=== East Scotland ===
- C.81 Isle of May, Fife
- C.82 Tentsmuir Point, Fife
- C.83 Tay Estuary, Fife - Perthshire
- C.84 St Cyrus, Kincardineshire
- C.85 Fowlsheugh, Kincardineshire
- C.86 Sands of Forvie and Ythan Estuary, Aberdeenshire
- C.87 Strathbeg, Aberdeenshire
- C.88 Macduff - Pennan Head, Aberdeenshire - Banffshire
- C.89 Culbin Sands, Moray - Nairn
- C.90 Mousa, Shetland
- C.91 Noss, Shetland
- C.92 Hermaness, Unst, Shetland
- C.93 Eden Estuary, Fife
- C.94 North Hoy, Orkney
- C.95 Haaf Gruney, Shetland
- C.96 Foula, Shetland
- C.97 Fair Isle, Shetland

=== West Scotland ===
- C.98 South Ardnamurchan Coast, Argyll
- C.99 Loch Gruinart - Loch Indaal, Islay, Argyll
- C.100 Ross of Mull, Argyll
- C.101 Rhum, Inverness-shire
- C.102 South Uist Machair, Inverness-shire

(a) Grogarry
(b) Askernish Coast

- C.103 Balranald, North Uist, Inverness-shire
- C.104 Monach Isles, Inverness-shire
- C.105 St Kilda, Inverness-shire
- C.106 North Rona and Sula Sgeir, Ross
- C.107 Oldshore - Sandwood Coast, Sutherland
- C.108 Cape Wrath - Aodann Mhor, Sutherland
- C.109 Invernaver, Sutherland
- C.110 Loch Fleet, Sutherland
- C.111 Morrich More, Ross
- C.112 Cromarty Firth, Ross
- C.113 Rhunahaorine, Argyll
- C.114 Ruel Estuary, Argyll
- C.115 Barrafol and Ballevullin, Tiree, Argyll
- C.116 Ardmeanach, Mull, Argyll
- C.117 Mingulay and Berneray, Inverness-shire
- C.118 Baleshare / Kirkibost Dunes, North Uist, Inverness-shire
- C.119 Northton, Harris, Inverness-shire
- C.120 Shiant Isles, Ross
- C.121 Handa - Duartmore, Sutherland
- C.122 Flannan Isles, ROss
- C.123 Lower Dornoch Firth, Ross - Sutherland

== Woodlands ==
=== Southeast England ===
- W.1 Blean Woods, Kent
- W.2 Ham Street Woods, Kent
- W.3 Alkham Valley Woods, Kent
- W.4 Scords Wood, Kent
- W.5 Asholt Wood, Kent
- W.6 Crookhorn Wood, Kent
- W.7 Wouldham - Detling Escarpment, Kent
- W.8 Bignor Hill, Sussex
- W.9 Saxonbury Hill / Eridge Park, Sussex
- W.10 Kingley Vale, Sussex
- W.11 Ebernoe Common, Sussex
- W.12 Wakehurst and Chiddingly Woods, Sussex
- W.13 The Men's and The Cut and Bedham Escarpment, Sussex
- W.14 Fairlight, Ecclesbourne and Warren Glens, Sussex
- W.15 Wormley Wood - Hoddesdon Park Wood, Hertfordshire
- W.16 Ellendon Wood, Kent
- W.17 Ashburnham Park, Sussex
- W.18 Parham Park, Sussex
- W.19 Staffhurst Wood, Surrey
- W.20 Colyers Hanger, Surrey
- W.21 Glover's Wood, Surrey

=== South England ===
- W.22 Bradenham Woods, Buckinghamshire
- W.23 Windsor Forest, Berkshire
- W.24 Wychwood Forest, Oxfordshire
- W.25 Waterperry Wood, Oxfordshire
- W.26 New Forest, Hampshire
- W.27 Selborne Hanger, Hampshire
- W.28 Burnham Beeches, Buckinghamshire
- W.29 Aston Rowant Woods, Buckinghamshire
- W.30 Windsor Hill, Buckinghamshire
- W.31 Savernake Forest, Wiltshire
- W.32 Cranborne Chase, Wiltshire/Dorset

=== East Anglia ===
- W.33 Hintlesham Woods, Suffolk

(a) Hintlesham and Ramsey Woods
(b) Wolves Wood

- W.34 Staverton Park, Suffolk
- W.35 Felshamhall & Monks Park Woods, Suffolk
- W.36 Cavenham - Tuddenham Woods, Suffolk
- W.37 Sotterley Park, Suffolk
- W.38 Bure Marshes, Norfolk
- W.39 Swanton Novers Woods, Norfolk
- W.40 Hayley Wood, Cambridgeshire
- W.41 Holme Fen, Huntingdonshire
- W.42 Monks Wood, Huntingdonshire
- W.43 Bedford Purlieus Group, Northamptonshire, and Peterborough

(a) Bedford Purlieus
(b) Wittering Coppice
(c) Easton Hornstocks
(d) Collyweston Great Wood

- W.44 Castor Hanglands, Peterborough
- W.45 (i) Bardney Forest (Lincolnshire Limewoods), Lincolnshire

(a) Hatton Wood
(b) Newball and Hardy Gang Woods
(c) Stainfield and Scotgrove Woods
(d) Potterhanworth Wood

- W.45 (ii) Bardney Forest (Lincolnshire Limewoods), Lincolnshire

(a) Great West - Cocklode - Spring Woods
(b) Stainton - Fulnetby Woods
(c) Wickenby Wood

- W.46 Benacre Park, Suffolk
- W.47 Foxley Wood, Norfolk
- W.48 Wayland Wood, Norfolk
- W.49 Sexton Wood, Norfolk
- W.50 Felbrigg Woods, Norfolk
- W.51 King's and Baker's Woods, Bedfordshire
- W.52 Hales Wood, Essex
- W.53 Canfield Hart Wood, Essex
- W.54 Hatfield Forest, Essex
- W.55 Epping Forest, Essex
- W.56 Overhall Grove, Cambridgeshire
- W.57 Hardwick Wood, Cambridgeshire
- W.58 Kesteven Woods, Lincolnshire

(a) Dole Wood
(b) Dunsby Wood
(c) Kirton Wood
(d) Sapperton - Pickworth Woods

=== South-west England ===
- W.59 Melbury Park, Dorset
- W.60 Boconnoc Park and Woods, Cornwall
- W.61 Fal Estuary, Cornwall
- W.62 Dizzard - Millook Cliffs, Cornwall
- W.63 Bovey Valley and Yarner Woods, Devon
- W.64 Holne Chase, Devon
- W.65 Wistman's Wood, Devon
- W.66 Black Tor Copse, Devon
- W.67 Axmouth - Lyme Regis Undercliffs, Devon
- W.68 Watersmeet, Devon
- W.69 Holnicote and Horner Water, Somerset
- W.70 Avon Gorge (Leigh Woods), Gloucestershire, Somerset
- W.71 Mendip Woodlands, Somerset

(a) Rodney Stoke
(b) Asham Wood
(c) Ebbor Gorge

- W.72 Cotswold Commons and Beechwoods, Gloucestershire
- W.73 Forest of Dean, Gloucestershire

(a) Nagshead Inclosure
(b) Dingle Wood
(c) Speech House

- W.74 Collinpark Wood, Gloucestershire
- W.75 Hudnalls, Gloucestershire
- W.76 Merthen Wood, Cornwall
- W.77 Nance Wood, Cornwall
- W.78 Draynes Wood, Cornwall
- W.79 Piles Copse, Devon
- W.80 Dendles Wood, Devon
- W.81 Woody Bay, Devon
- W.82 Heddon Valley Woods, Devon
- W.83 Hobby Woods, Devon
- W.84 Holford and Hodder's Combes, Somerset
- W.85 Ashen Copse, Somerset
- W.86 Great Breach and Copley Woods, Somerset
- W.87 Weston Big Wood, Somerset

=== South Wales ===
- W.88 Cwm Clydach, Brecknock
- W.89 Penmoelallt, Brecknock
- W.90 Coed Rheidol, Cardiganshire
- W.91 Cothi Tywi, Carmarthenshire
- W.92 Coed y Cerrig, Monmouthshire
- W.93 Salisbury Wood: Coed Salsbri, Monmouthshire
- W.94 Blackcliff - Wyndcliff - Pierce Woods: Clogwyn Du - Clogwyn Gwyn - Coed Pyrs, Monmouthshire
- W.95 Wye Gorge: Hafan Gwy, Monmouthshire - Gloucestershire - Herefordshire
- W.96 Nant Irfon, Brecknock
- W.97 Carn Gafallt, Brecknock
- W.98 Blaenau Nedd & Mellte, Brecknock
- W.99 Darren Fach, Brecknock
- W.100 Glannau, Radnor
- W.101 Coed Aber Edw, Radnor
- W.102 Coombe Woods: Coed y Cwm, Monmouthshire

=== North Wales ===
- W.103 Coedydd Dyffryn Conwy, Caernarvonshire

(a) Coed Dolgarrog
(b) Coed Gorswen
(c) Ceunant Dulyn

- W.104 Coedydd Aber, Caernarvonshire
- W.105 Coed Termadog, Caernarvonshire
- W.106 Coed Dinorwig, Caernarvonshire
- W.107 Coedydd Dyffryn Maentwrog, Merioneth

(a) Coed Camlyn — Ceunant Llennyrch
(b) Coedydd Maentwrog - Coed Cymerau
(c) Coed y Rhygen
(d) Ceunant Cynfal
(e) Ceunant Llechrwd, Gellilydan

- W.108 Coed Ganllwyd, Merioneth
- W.109 Coed Crafnant, Merioneth
- W.110 Bryn Maelgwyn & Gloddaeth, Caernarvonshire
- W.111 Hafod Garegog, Caernarvonshire
- W.112 Coed Maes Yr Helmau: Torrent Walk, Merioneth
- W.113 Coed Llety Walter, Merioneth
- W.114 Coed Llechwedd, Merioneth

=== Midlands ===
- W.115 Derbyshire Dales Woodlands, Derbyshire / Staffordshire

(a) Lathkill Dale
(b) Cressbrook Dale
(c) Dove Dale Ashwood

- W.116 Halesend Wood, Herefordshire
- W.117 Moccas Park, Herefordshire
- W.118 Hill Hole Dingle, Herefordshire
- W.119 Tick Wood, Shropshire
- W.120 Long Itchington and Upton Woods, Warwickshire
- W.121 Wyre Forest, Worcestershire, Shropshire
- W.122 Cannock Chase, Staffordshire
- W.123 Hamps and Manifold Valleys, Staffordshire
- W.124 Brampton Bryan Park, Herefordshire
- W.125 Downton Gorge, Herefordshire
- W.126 Bushy Hazels and Cwmma Moors, Herefordshire
- W.127 Leighfield Forest, Leicestershire
- W.128 Pipewell Woods, Northamptonshire
- W.129 Whittlewood Forest, Northamptonshire
- W.130 Sherwood Forest, Nottinghamshire
- W.131 Habberley Valley, Shropshire
- W.132 Chaddesley - Bandan Woods, Worcestershire

=== North England ===
- W.133 Borrowdale Woods, Cumberland

(a) Castle Head Wood
(b) The Ings
(c) Great Wood
(d) Lodore - Troutdale Woods
(e) Johnny's Wood
(f) Seatoller Wood

- W.134 Keskadale and Birkrigg Oaks, Cumberland
- W.135 Orton Moss, Cumberland
- W.136 Whitbarrow and Witherslack Woods, Westmorland
- W.137 Birk Fell, Westmorland
- W.138 Helbeck and Swindale Woods, Westmorland
- W.139 Roudsea Wood, Lancashire
- W.140 Gait Barrows, Lancashire
- W.141 Roeburndale Woods, Lancashire
- W.142 Ribblehead Woods, Lancashire

(a) Colt Park
(b) Ling Gill

- W.143 Conistone Old Pasture and Bastow Wood, Yorkshire
- W.144 Raincliffe Wood, Yorkshire
- W.145 Shipley Wood, Durham / Yorkshire
- W.146 Scales Wood, Cumberland
- W.147 Lyne Woods, Cumberland
- W.148 Gowbarrow Park, Cumberland
- W.149 Naddle Low Forest, Westmorland
- W.150 Low Wood, Hartsop, Westmorland
- W.151 Smardale Woods, Westmorland
- W.152 Lowther Park, Westmorland
- W.153 Eaves Wood, Lancashire
- W.154 Burton Wood, Lancashire
- W.155 Hawkswick Wood, Yorkshire
- W.156 Scoska Wood, Yorkshire
- W.157 Thornton and Twistleton Glens, Yorkshire
- W.158 Ashberry and Reins Woods, Yorkshire
- W.159 Beckhole Woods, Yorkshire
- W.160 Beast Cliff, Yorkshire
- W.161 Kisdon Force Woods, Yorkshire
- W.162 Castle Eden Dene, Durham
- W.163 Holystone Woods, Northumberland
- W.164 Monk Wood, Northumberland
- W.165 Hesleyside Park and Hareshaw Link, Northumberland
- W.166 Billsmoor Park and Grasslees Wood, Northumberland

=== South Scotland ===
- W.167 Tynron Juniper Wood, Dumfries-shire
- W.168 Kirkconnell Flow, Kirkcudbrightshire
- W.169 Loch Lomond Woods, Dunbartonshire / Stirlingshire

(a) Inchcailloch
(b) Torrinch
(c) Clairinsh
(d) Creinch
(e) Aber Isle
(f) Inchlonaig
(g) Mainland Woods

- W.170 Avondale, Lanarkshire
- W.171 Glen Diomhan, Buteshire
- W.172 Chanlock Foot, Dumfries-shire
- W.173 Stenhouse Wood, Dumfries-shire
- W.174 Maidens - Heads of Ayr, Ayrshire
- W.175 Hamilton High Park, Lanarkshire
- W.176 Nethan Gorge, Lanarkshire
- W.177 Wood of Cree, Kirkcudbrightshire
- W.178 Fleet Woodlands, Kirkcudbrightshire

(a) Castramont Wood
(b) Killiegowan Wood
(c) Jennoch Wood
(d) Craigy Braes Wood

- W.179 Ravenshall Wood, Kirkcudbrightshire

=== East Scotland ===
- W.180 Dinnet Oakwood, Aberdeenshire
- W.181 Crathie Wood, Aberdeenshire
- W.182 Morrone Wood, Aberdeenshire
- W.183 Aviemore Woodlands, Inverness-shire

(a) Craigellachie
(b) Kinrara Woods (Torr Alvie)

- W.184 Glen Tarff, Inverness-shire
- W.185 Pass of Killiecrankie, Perthshire
- W.186 Black Wood of Rannoch, Perthshire
- W.187 Speyside - Deeside Pinewoods, Inverness-shire - Aberdeenshire

(a) Ballochbuie Forest
(b) Glen Tanar
(c) Glens Quoich, Lui and Derry
(d) Rothiemurchus - Invereshie
(e) Abernethy Forest

- W.188 Earlshall Muir, Fife
- W.189 Keltney Burn, Coshieville, Perthshire

=== West Scotland ===
- W.190 Loch Sunart Woodlands, Argyll

(a) Ariundle
(b) Salen - Strontian
(c) Laudale - Glen Cripesdale
(d) Ben Hiant

- W.191 Carnach Wood, Argyll
- W.192 Drimnin, Argyll
- W.193 Glasdrum Wood, Argyll
- W.194 Glen Nant Woods, Argyll
- W.195 Meall Nah Gobhar, Argyll
- W.196 Taynish Wood, Argyll
- W.197 Mealdarroch Point - Skipness, Argyll
- W.198 Inverneil Burn, Argyll
- W.199 Urquhart Bay, Inverness-shire
- W.200 Loch Morar Islands, Inverness-shire
- W.201 Tokavaig Wood, Skye, Inverness-shire
- W.202 Geary Ravine, Skye, Inverness-shire
- W.203 Glen Strathfarrah, Inverness-shire
- W.204 Glen Affric, Inverness-shire
- W.205 Allt Nan Carnan, Ross
- W.206 Loch Maree Woods, Ross

(a) Beinn Eighe (Coille na Glas-Leitire)
(b) Loch Maree Islands
(c) Letterewe Oakwoods

- W.207 Inverpolly Woods, Ross
- W.208 Rassal Ashwood, Ross
- W.209 Corrieshalloch Gorge, Wood
- W.210 Mound Alderwoods, Sutherland
- W.211 Strathbeag, Sutherland
- W.212 Coille Ardura, Mull
- W.213 Choille Mor, Colonsay, Argyll
- W.214 Claggain - Ardmore, Islay, Argyll
- W.215 Crannach Wood, Argyll
- W.216 Doire Donn, Argyll
- W.217 Glendaruel Wood, Argyll
- W.218 Kinuachrach, Jura, Argyll
- W.219 Clais Dhearg, Argyll
- W.220 Loch Na Dal, Skye, Inverness-shire

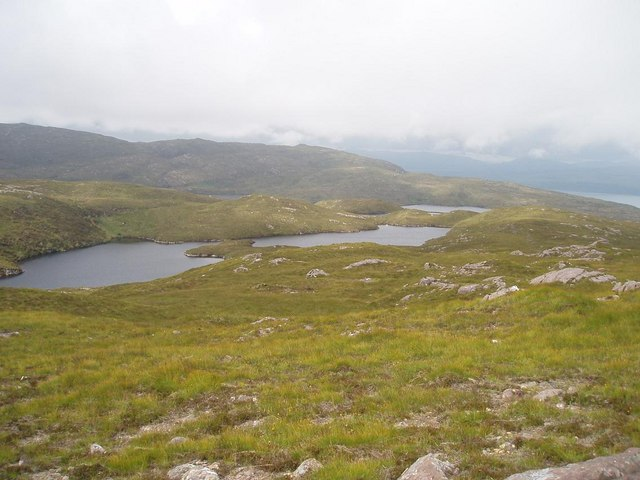
Loch A' Mhuillan

- W.221 Loch Moidart, Inverness-shire
- W.222 Shieldaig, Ross

(a) Mheallaidh
(b) Coille Creag Loch

- W.223 Fionn Loch Islands, Ross
- W.224 Amat Wood, Ross
- W.225 Eilean Na Gartaig, Cam Loch, Sutherland
- W.226 Loch A' Mhuillin Wood, Scourie, Sutherland
- W.227 Ledmore Wood, Spinningdale, Sutherland
- W.228 Migdale Woods, Sutherland
- W.229 Ardvar Woodlands, Sutherland

== Lowland grasslands, heaths and scrub ==
=== Southeast England ===
- L.1 Ashdown Forest, Sussex
- L.2 Thursley and Hankley Commons, Surrey
- L.3 Wye and Crundale Downs, Kent
- L.4 Castle Hill, Sussex
- L.5 Mount Caburn (Lewes Downs), Sussex

Lewes Downs
Mount Caburn

- L.6 Lullington Heath, Sussex
- L.7 Box Hill - Headley, Surrey

Box Hill
Headley Heath

- L.8 Harting Down, Sussex
- L.9 Kingley Vale, Sussex
- L.10 Wouldham - Detling Escarpment, Kent
- L.11 Halling - Trottiscliffe, Kent
- L.12 White Downs, Surrey
- L.13 Iping and Ambersham Commons, Sussex
- L.14 Chobham Common, Surrey
- L.15 Folkestone to Etchinghill Escarpment, Kent
- L.16 Heyshott Down, Sussex
- L.17 Purple Hill and Queendown Warren, Kent
- L.18 Therfield Heath, Hertfordshire
- L.19 Fulking Escarpment / Newtimber Hill, Sussex

=== South England ===
- L.20 New Forest Heaths, Hampshire
- L.21 Aston Rowant, Oxfordshire
- L.22 Aston Upthorpe DOwn, Berkshire
- L.23 Compton Down, Isle of Wight, Hampshire
- L.24 Martin Down, Hampshire
- L.25 Old Winchester Hill, Hampshire
- L.26 Pewsey DOwns, Wiltshire

South-west Wiltshire Downs (L.27 to L.35)

- L.27 Wylye Down, Wiltshire
- L.28 Prescombe Down, Wiltshire
- L.29 Knighton Down, Wiltshire
- L.30 Steeple Langford, Cow Down and Clifford Bottom, Wiltshire
- L.31 Woodminton Down - Knowle Hill, Wiltshire
- L.32 Knapp Down, Wiltshire
- L.33 Starveall Down and Stony Hill, Wiltshire
- L.34 Parsonage Down, Wiltshire
- L.35 Scratchbury & Cotley Hills, Wiltshire
- L.36 Porton Down, Wiltshire - Hampshire
- L.37 Tennyson Down, Isle of Wight, Hampshire
- L.38 Ellesborough Warren, Buckinghamshire
- L.39 Burghclere Beacon, Hampshire
- L.40 Rushmore Down, Hampshire
- L.41 Bulford Down, Wiltshire
- L.42 Oldbury Castle and Cherhill Downs, Wiltshire
- L.43 North Meadow, Cricklade, Wiltshire
- L.44 Clattinger Farm, Oaksey, Wiltshire
- L.45 Bransbury Common, Hampshire
- L.46 Lower Woodford Water Meadows, Wiltshire
- L.47 Pixey and Yarnton Meads / Port Meadow, Oxfordshire
- L.48 Fyfield Down, Wiltshire
- L.49 Homington, Odstock and Coombe Bissett Downs, Wiltshire
- L.50 Noar Hill, Hampshire
- L.51 Throope Down, Wiltshire
- L.52 Trow Down, Wiltshire
- L.53 Well Bottom, Upton Lovell, Wiltshire
- L.54 Stockbridge Down, Hampshire
- L.55 Ivinghoe Hills, Steps Hill and Pitstone Hill, Buckinghamshire, Hertfordshire
- L.56 Coombe Hill, Wendover, Buckinghamshire
- L.57 Britford - Downton, Wiltshire

=== East Anglia ===
- L.58 Dunwich Heaths and marshes, Suffolk
- L.59 Roydon Common, Norfolk
- L.60 Stanford - Wretham Heaths, Norfolk

(a) Stanford Practical Training Area
(b) East Wretham Heath
(c) Bridgham - Brettenham Heaths

- L.61 Icklingham Heaths, Suffolk

(a) Cavenham - Tuddenham Heaths
(b) Icklingham Plains and Triangle
(c) Deadman's Grave

- L.62 Lakenheath - Elveden Heaths, Suffolk

(a) Lakenheath Warren and Eriswell High and low Warrens
(b) Wangford Warren - Airfield Lights
(c) Wangford Carr
(d) Berner's, Horn and Weather Heaths
(e) Maidscross Hill
(f) Lord's Well Field

- L.63 Foxhole Heath, Suffolk
- L.64 Weeting Heath, Norfolk
- L.65 Thetford Heaths, Suffolk - Norfolk

(a) Thetford Heath
(b) Sketchvar Heath
(c) RAF Barnham
(d) Barnhamcross Common
(e) Little Heath

- L.66 Risby Warren, Lincolnshire
- L.67 Knocking Hoe, Bedfordshire
- L.68 Barton Hills, Bedfordshire
- L.69 Barnack Hills and Holes, Huntingdon and Peterborough
- L.70 Ouse Washes, Cambridgeshire - Norfolk
- L.71 Thompson Common, Norfolk
- L.72 Upwood Meadows, Huntingdon and Peterborough
- L.73 Sibson - Castor Meadows, Huntingdon and Peterborough

(a) Sibson - Sutton
(b) Chesterton - Castor

- L.74 Monewden Meadows, Suffolk
- L.75 Holt Lowes, Norfolk
- L.76 Sandringham Warren (Dersingham Bog), Norfolk
- L.77 Barnham Heath, Suffolk
- L.78 Thetford Warren, Norfolk
- L.79 Chalk Hill, Barton Mills, Suffolk
- L.80 Holywell Mound, Lincolnshire
- L.81 Castor Hanglands, Huntingdon and Peterborough
- L.82 Foulden Common, Norfolk
- L.83 Calceby Beck, Lincolnshire
- L.84 Baston Fen, Lincolnshire
- L.85 Port Holme, Huntingdonshire
- L.86 Bratoft Meadow, Lincolnshire
- L.87 Moors Closes, Ancaster, Lincolnshire

=== South-west England ===
South Dorset Heathlands (L.88 to L.90)

- L.88 Hartland Moor and Arne Heaths, Dorset
- L.89 Studland and Godlingston Heaths, Dorset
- L.90 Morden Bog, Dorset
- L.91 Aylesbeare Common, Devon
- L.92 North Dartmoor, Devon
- L.93 Isles of Scilly

Castle Down, Tresco
Chapel Down, St Martin's
Shipman Head and Shipman Down, Bryher

- L.94 Chapel Porth, St Agnes, Cornwall
- L.95 The Lizard, Cornwall

The West Lizard
Goonhilly Downs and Brays Cot
Traboe Downs
Crowsa Downs
Main Dale
Coverack Cliffs, including the Grove
Mullion Cliffs
Hayle Kimbro Pool
Ruan Pool
South and East Lizard
Kennack to Black Head Cliffs

- L.96 Eggardon Hill, Haydon and Askerswell Downs, Dorset
- L.97 Hod and Hambledon Hills, Dorset
- L.98 Boxwell, Gloucestershire
- L.99 Barnsley Warren, Gloucestershire
- L.100 Rodborough Common, Gloucestershire
- L.101 Cleeve Hill, Gloucestershire
- L.102 Avon Gorge, Gloucestershire - Somerset
- L.103 Cheddar Gorge, Somerset
- L.104 Brean Down and Uphill Cliff, Somerset
- L.105 Berry Head, Devon
- L.106 Creech – Grange – Povington Heaths, Dorset
- L.107 Dunkery Beacon, Somerset
- L.108 Park Bottom, Higher Houghton, Dorset
- L.109 Brassey, Gloucestershire
- L.110 Hornsleasow Roughs, Gloucestershire
- L.111 Minchinhampton Common, Gloucestershire
- L.112 Crook Peak, Somerset
- L.113 Dolebury Warren, Somerset
- L.114 Coombe Hill Canal, Gloucestershire

=== South Wales ===
- L.115 Glyn Perfedd, Brecknock
- L.116 Pen Yr Hen Allt, Brecknock
- L.117 Bannau Preseli & Chomin Carningli, Pembrokeshire
- L.118 Drostre Bank: Cefn Tros Dre, Brecknock
- L.119 Boxbush, Brecknock

=== North Wales ===
- L.120 Glannau Ynys Gybi: Holy Island Coast, Anglesey
- L.121 Great Ormes Head: Pen y Gogarth, Caernarvonshire
- L.122 Yr Eifl, Caernarvonshire

=== Midlands ===
- L.123 Stiperstones, Shropshire
- L.124 (i) Derbyshire Dales Grasslands, Derbyshire - Staffordshire

(a) Dove Valley and Biggin Dale
(b) Lathkill Dale
(c) Cressbrook Dale
(d) Monk's Dale
(e) Long Dale and Gratton Dale

- L.124 (ii) Derbyshire Dales Grasslands, Derbyshire

(a) Coombs Dale
(b) Miller's Dale
(c) Topley Pike and Deep Dale

- L.125 Marston Meadows, Staffordshire
- L.126 Foster's Green Meadows, Worcestershire
- L.127 Bredon Hill, Worcestershire
- L.128 Cribb's Lodge Meadow, Leicestershire

=== North England ===
- L.129 Skipwith Common, Yorkshire
- L.130 Waterdale, Yorkshire
- L.131 Duggleby High Barn Wold, Yorkshire
- L.132 East Dale, Yorkshire
- L.133 Humphrey Head, Lancashire
- L.134 Gait Barrows, Lancashire
- L.135 Hutton Roof Crags and Farleton Knott, Westmorland
- L.136 Whitbarrow Scar, Westmorland
- L.137 Scout and Cunswick Scars, Westmorland
- L.138 Thrislington Plantation, Durham
- L.139 Orton Meadows, Westmorland
- L.140 Crosby Gill, Westmorland
- L.141 Wintringham Marsh, Yorkshire
- L.142 Derwent Ings, Yorkshire
- L.143 Gowk Bank, Cumberland
- L.144 Upper Teesdale Meadows, Durham - Yorkshire
- L.145 Strensall Common, Yorkshire
- L.146 Lazonby and Wan Fells, Cumberland
- L.147 Arnside Knott and Warton Crag, Westmorland - Lancashire
- L.148 Cassop Vale, Durham

=== South Scotland ===
- L.149 Ken - Dee Marshes, Kirkcudbrightshire

=== East Scotland ===
- L.150 Sands of Forvie, Aberdeenshire

=== West Scotland ===
- L.151 Oykell Marshes, Ross - Sutherland

== Open waters ==
=== Southeast England ===
- OW.1 Open Pits, Kent
- OW.2 Pevensey Levels, Sussex
- OW.3 Tring Reservoirs, Hertfordshire
- OW.4 Romney Marsh, Kent

=== South England ===
- OW.5 River Avon system, Hampshire / Wiltshire
- OW.6 Oberwater, Hampshire
- OW.7 Woolmer Pond, Hampshire
- OW.8 Moors River, Hampshire / Dorset
- OW.9 Cotswold Water Park, Wiltshire / Gloucestershire
- OW.10 Hatchet Pond, Hampshire
- OW.11 Wychwood Ponds, Oxfordshire
