= Castor, Cambridgeshire =

Village and civil parish in England

Coordinates: 52.573°N 0.343°W

Castor
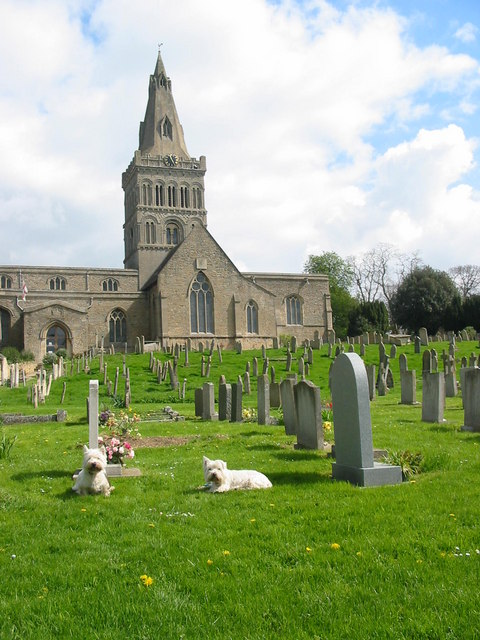
- St Kyneburgha's Church, Castor

- Location within Cambridgeshire
- Population: 817 (2001 census)
- OS grid reference: TL124985
- Civil parish: Castor
- Unitary authority: Peterborough
- Ceremonial county: Cambridgeshire
- Region: East
- Country: England
- Sovereign state: United Kingdom
- Post town: Peterborough
- Postcode district: PE5
- Dialling code: 01733
- Police: Cambridgeshire
- Fire: Cambridgeshire
- Ambulance: East of England
- UK Parliament: North West Cambridgeshire
- Website: Castor Home Page

Castor is a village and civil parish in the City of Peterborough unitary authority, about 4 miles (6.4 km) west of the city centre. The parish is part of the former Soke of Peterborough, which was considered part of Northamptonshire until 1888 and then Huntingdon and Peterborough from 1965 to 1974, when it became part of Cambridgeshire.

== Toponym ==
Castor's name is derived from the Old English ceaster, possibly referring to the Roman fort across the River Nene at Durobrivae, or more probably referring to the massive Praetorium on the hilltop at Castor.

== History ==
=== Roman ===
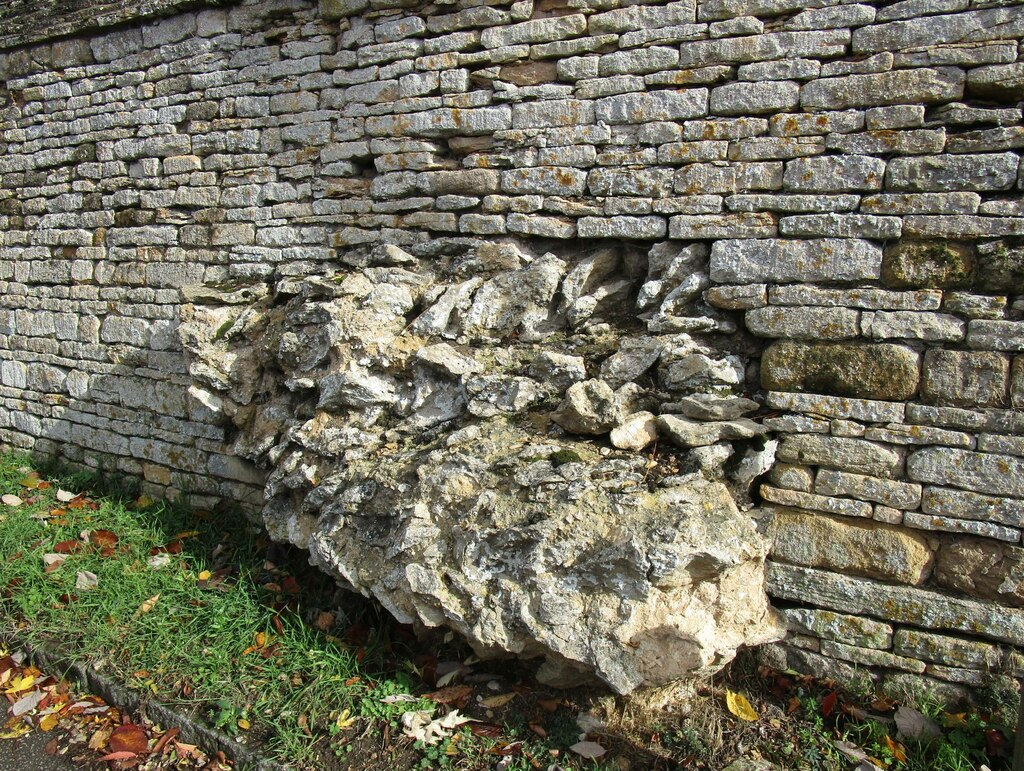
Roman masonry incorporated in a later wall

In the Roman period, there was a huge palatial structure at Castor. This was extensively excavated in the 1820s by Edmund Artis, the agent for the Fitzwilliam estate, who published a volume of illustrations about his work, which he suggested was a praetorium. Recent small-scale work has confirmed that it extended over a considerable area: Roman buildings covered an area of 290 by 130 m (3.77 ha) and had at least 11 rooms with tessellated floors and mosaics, at least two bathhouses and several hypocausts. The masonry which survives points to a monumental architecture indicating two major phases of building.

A recent survey by Stephen Upex suggested that the earlier smaller building dates to the 2nd century, but that the major palatial building dates to 240 – 260 AD. The structure is linked to a similar structure at Stonea 35 km to the south. It is suggested that in the Roman period, the Fens were a vast imperial estate and that at first Stonea was the seat of the procurator where the taxes were collected, and that after 250 this function was transferred to Castor.

The Praetorium may be connected with the town of Durobrivae (modern Water Newton) on the other side of the river Nene. The whole area was the centre of the Nene Valley pottery industry which was one of the three major pottery-producing areas in late Roman Britain, producing pottery on an industrial scale.

The Praetorium appears to have been abandoned in the 5th century and there is a hiatus till the late 7th and 8th centuries, when finds from the area suggest considerable high-status activity. It is suggested that during the 7th century the former Roman site became the focus of the nunnery of St Kyneburgha, founded before 664.

=== Early medieval ===
Kyneburgha (d. c. 680) and Kyneswide were sisters, the daughters of King Penda of Mercia, the sisters of Peada of Mercia; their mother was Kynewise. Kyneburgha married Alhfrith of Deira, co-regent of Northumbria (who attended the Synod of Whitby in 664), but later founded an abbey for both monks and nuns in Castor. She became the first abbess. She was buried in her church, but her remains were translated, before 972, to Peterborough Abbey, now Peterborough Cathedral. She had been one of the signatories, together with her brother Wulfhere, of the founding charter of Peterborough Abbey, dated 664. The Danes laid waste to the area in around AD 870.

The Church of England parish church of St Kyneburgha dates from 1124. It is notable for its Romanesque architecture and includes notable medieval wall paintings. It is a Grade I listed building. It is the only church of that dedication in England. The Romanesque tower is 71 feet (22 metres) high, topped by a later spire of 44 feet high (13 metres), giving a total height of 115 feet (35 metres).

=== Late medieval ===
The Robin Hood and Little John Standing Stones were erected here between the 12th and 14th centuries in an agreement with the abbot of Peterborough Abbey that tolls would not be levied on the passage of stone from the abbey's quarries at Barnack.

=== Modern ===
The common lands of Castor and the neighbouring parish of Ailsworth were not enclosed until 1898.

The route of the London and North Western Railway branch line between Northampton and Peterborough passes through the parish. It was opened in 1845, including Castor railway station built to serve the village. British Railways closed the station in 1957 and the line in 1966, and Castor station has been demolished. The Nene Valley Railway reopened the section of line through Castor in 1977, but has not reopened a station at Castor.

The £9 million dual-carriageway Ailsworth and Castor Bypass, which is part of the A47 road, was opened in September 1991.

An episode of Time Team was filmed here and broadcast in 2011, revealing and confirming the huge size and height of the Roman praetorium.

== See also ==
- Castor Hanglands National Nature Reserve
