= Bedford Purlieus National Nature Reserve =

Ancient woodland in Cambridgeshire, England

Bedford Purlieus
- Site of Special Scientific Interest
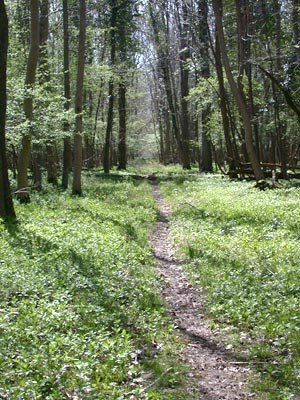

- Location within Cambridgeshire
- Location of Bedford Purlieus.
- Area of search: Cambridgeshire
- Grid reference: TL042995
- Coordinates: 52.5833°N 0.4591°W
- Interest: Biological
- Area: 211 hectares (520 acres)
- Notification date: 1969

Bedford Purlieus is a 211-hectare (520-acre) ancient woodland in Cambridgeshire, in the United Kingdom. It is a national nature reserve and Site of Special Scientific Interest owned and managed by the Forestry Commission. In Thornhaugh civil parish, 10 km (6.2 mi) south of Stamford and 14 km (8.7 mi) west of Peterborough, the wood is within the Peterborough unitary authority area of Cambridgeshire, and borders Northamptonshire. In Roman times it was an iron smelting centre, during the medieval period it was in the Royal Forest of Rockingham, and later it became part of the estates of the Duke of Bedford. Bedford Purlieus appears to have been continuously wooded at least from Roman times, and probably since the ice receded. The woodland may have the richest range of vascular plants of any English lowland wood. It acquired particular significance in the 1970s as an early subject for the historical approach to ecology and woodland management.

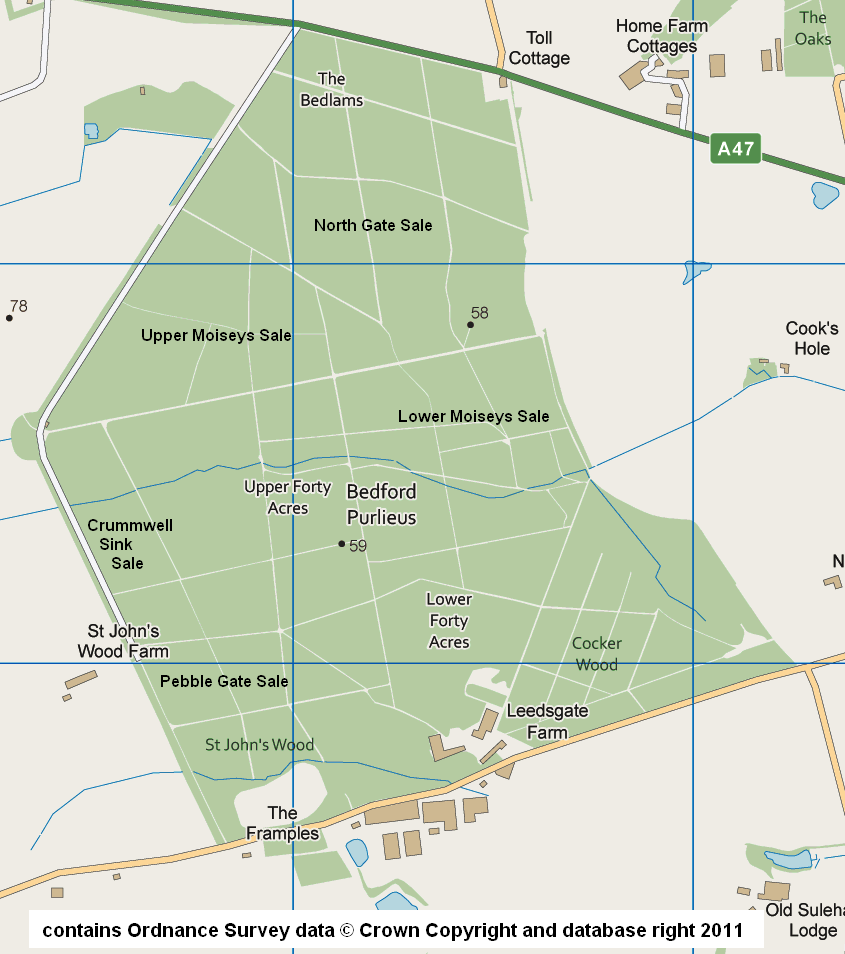
Map of Bedford Purlieus Wood, Cambridgeshire

== National nature reserve ==
Bedford Purlieus was declared a national nature reserve (NNR) in 2000. Most of England's 224 NNRs are managed by Natural England, but 88 are wholly or partly managed by other approved bodies. Bedford Purlieus is managed by the Forestry Commission, and is open to the public during daylight hours. It is notable for having a wider variety of herbaceous woodland plants than almost any other English woodland. The 211 hectares (520 acres) of ancient woodland was declared a Site of Special Scientific Interest in 1969, and it is a Nature Conservation Review site, Grade I. The abundance and variety of the woodland flora and fauna is outstanding. The range of woodland flowers are especially notable. There were 462 species of vascular plants listed as present in the woods in 1975, and the whole range of flora associated with ancient woodland is exceptionally rich. A principal reason for this is the variety of soil types, resulting from a geology that ranges from highly calcareous limestone and tufa through to highly acidic sands and silts. The variety of coppice woodland types, the management history, the wide grassland rides, and even the periodic disturbances caused by coppicing, felling and other interventions such as the wartime installations have all added habitats that maintain the diversity of species within the woods.

== Forestry Commission Wood ==
Bedford Purlieus has been owned by the Forestry Commission since 1933. Throughout the war and post-war years the emphasis was on maximising timber production. The 1970s saw a new interest in the ecological value of the woods, and the possibilities for both leisure and conservation.

=== Commercial management ===
The Forestry Commission acquired the Bedford Purlieus from a timber merchant who had removed the most saleable timber, and soon after 1933 almost all of the remaining wood was cut, and a replanting programme was begun, which continued until the 1950s. By then the policy of planting both broadleaved and conifer trees within the wood had been standard practice for 100 years, and the practice continued and expanded under Forestry Commission ownership. Although there is now no doubt that the non-native conifers damage and diminish the conservation value of the woodland, it appears that in this instance they also secured its survival.

The planting programme of the 1940s was principally of oak, but also larch, Scots pine and Corsican pine. Unlike in a coppice-with-standards rotation, Bedford Purlieus woodland is much more even in age. However, when an ancient woodland is cleared and planted the result is not just a monoculture of the newly planted trees. The canopy is now a mix of the planted trees, self-sown trees and shrubs, and regrowth of coppice stools, some probably of more recent origin, other stools clearly dating back to antiquity. The species diversity that characterises the woods was thus retained, and oak, lime, large-leaved elm, hazel, ash, field maple, English elm, sycamore, chestnut and birch are all to be found in substantial quantities.

An exception to all this is the northern end of the present wood, known as The Bedlams. This is not ancient wood, but a 19th-century conifer plantation, which was replanted in the 1950s with beech, Norway spruce, Western hemlock and Grand fir. Also, a re-instated open-cast ironstone quarry on the eastern side was planted with Corsican pine.

=== Conservation and public access ===
In 1975 a major symposium was held to consider the management of Bedford Purlieus. Instigated by G.F. Peterken of the Nature Conservancy Council, it included contributions from the Forestry Commission, the Institute of Terrestrial Ecology and the local Naturalist Trusts. Acknowledging the role commercial demands had played in enabling the continued existence of the woods, Peterken states:

The fate of the woodland on the present site of Bedford Purlieus in Roman times is unknown. A reasonable conjecture is that the local iron-smelting activity, needing a supply of fuel, obliged the Romans to retain woodland in an area of relatively dense settlement from which it would otherwise have been cleared. It is a curious co-incidence that 2000 years later, its survival as a native broadleaf woodland was ensured through a period of intensive coniferous reforestation by the renewed demand for iron ore.

During the 1970s the Forestry Commission had begun a shift in focus to conservation and amenity value of their woods. The 1975 symposium considered the history and ecology of Bedford Purlieus and discussed how to retain and enhance the elements of the woods of greatest ecological value. The resulting publication, edited by G.F. Peterken and R.C. Welch, produced a detailed management plan. Among its recommendations were the restoration of areas of coppicing, and the reduction of conifers. The plan provided a basis for an ecological management of Bedford Purlieus within commercial constraints. Its designation as a national nature reserve in 2000 is a recognition of the extent to which the policy shift had been made. In 2005 it received an injection of funding from landfill tax credits arising from the nearby Augean landfill. This has facilitated the Forestry Commission to re-instate areas of coppicing, open up grassland glades and remove conifers and other introduced species.

As well as the shift from commercial to conservation forestry, the Forestry Commission have embraced the desire for public access. The emphasis at Bedford Purlieus is on 'quiet recreation' to minimise the impact on the woodland flora and fauna. A car park is available, accessed from the A47. There is a network of rides and paths within the wood, and it is open every day during daylight hours.

== The Wansford Estate ==
For 400 years the woods were part of the Wansford Estate, itself a part of the vast land holdings of the Russell family, Earls, and later Dukes of Bedford. It is this connection that is responsible for the name, and under their management, profound changes have taken place to both the size and character of the woods.

=== Thornhaugh Woods ===
Until the years following 1639 these woods were known as Thornhaugh Woods (also called 'the High Woods of Thornhaw'), being the principal woodland of the parish of Thornhaugh. The name Bedford Purlieus resulted from its association with the Earls and Dukes of Bedford, but it also reveals its more ancient history as a part of a Royal Forest. The woods came into the Russell family almost at the start of their rise to landed wealth. In 1526 John Russell married Anne Sapcote, an heiress whose property included the Thornhaugh Woods. He went on to be created Earl of Bedford by Henry VIII and was granted a vast estate at Woburn Abbey by Edward VI. Baron Russell of Thornhaugh in the County of Northampton (1603) is one of the subsidiary titles of the Dukes of Bedford.

=== The Duke of Bedford's Purlieus ===
Six generations later, William Russell, the 5th Earl (who would later become Duke of Bedford) was required by Charles I to pay £200 to 'Dissaforest' (sic) his woods at Thornhaugh. Never mind that they had been excluded from Forest Law some 350 years before. The King needed money to fight the English Civil War, and this was one of many ways the Treasury found to raise it. The Charter of 8 August 1639 sets out definitively that the woods are now purlieus, that is, land that was once part of a Royal Forest but has been legally disafforested. It names the various compartments (or sales) that make up the woods, and affirms that, "for £200 of lawful money of England well and truly paid" the 1,648 acres are "altogether dissaforested". It goes on to explain:

The Earl of Bedford can keep dogs not expeditated, (Note: An expeditated dog was one that had had its pads or claws removed, so that it could not hunt deer.) hounds, greyhounds and beagles, Netts guns Bows and arrows and all other engines to take chase and drive all wild beasts and birds of any kind and at all times of year hereafter for ever to fell and cut down all and all manner of woods underwoods coppices and trees as well oaks as other trees great and small whether green or dry of what nature or kind whatsoever being or to be within or upon.

After Charles II made the Earl a Duke in 1694, Thornhaugh Woods were to be known in the estate records as 'the Duke of Bedford's Purlieus'.

=== Grubbing up ===
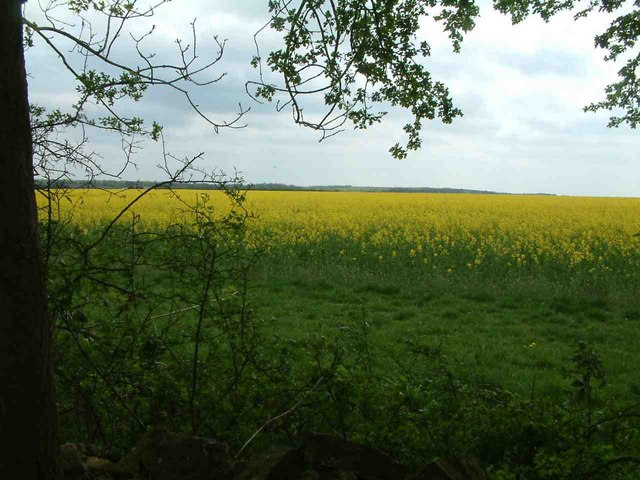
Bedford Purlieus, on the skyline, once extended across these fields to adjoin Easton Hornstocks, another ancient woodland and also a national nature reserve.

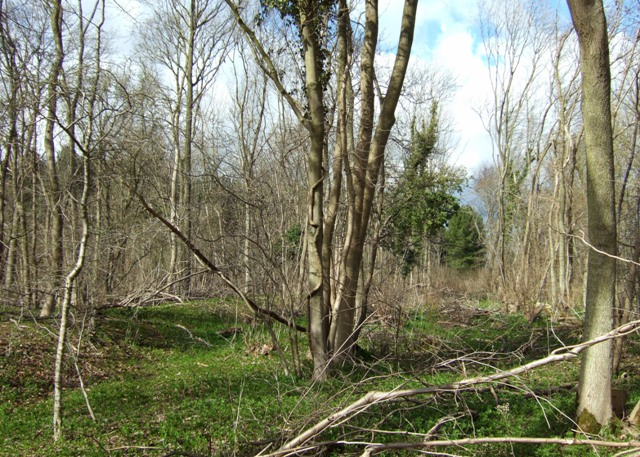
An area of coppice regrowth in Cocker Wood, the easternmost of the compartments

The woods remained in the Russell family through a further nine generations, though not all of it remained as woodland. Of the 1,648 acres (667 ha) described in the charter of 1639, around 1,000 acres (400 ha) was woodland. Now only half of that remains. Between 1862 and 1868 the western half of the wood was grubbed up and converted to agricultural land. The Peterborough Advertiser of 7 December 1912, looking back 50 years, describes how

men are still living in the villages of Wansford, Kingscliffe, Nassington and all around who were employed as foresters, woodmen, and oakers, that others are still living who helped to grub up nearly half that thousand acres of forest and make it into farmlands.

The article describes the 'Centre Tree', the site of which is now on the western edge of the wood, but was in the middle of the original wood.

Great landmark of the forest and still standing – in a clearance of about an acre in extent in the centre of this open apace stood centre tree – all ridings led up to it as all roads lead to Rome. Opening out of the clear space surrounding the tree were about ten or twelve ridings branching off into the forest in all directions and as they penetrated into the depths of the wood, branching again and again into intersecting glades and highways. To quote the old men: we got £10 an acre for grubbing – getting up the roots and undergrowth. In an acre there would not be very many of these great trees – oaks, ashes, elms and lime, but the bulk would be the roots of the underwood.

=== The woodland compartments ===
These straight radiating rides had been cut through from 1733 onwards. Before that time the rides followed roughly rectangular compartment boundaries, which date back to medieval times. Although the new rides caused some shifts in boundaries, the names used for the compartments have been very enduring (see table below). The continuity of compartment names is a useful proof that the same wood is being described through the change from Thornhaugh Woods to Bedford Purlieus.

Compartment names (known as 'Sales') in Bedford Purlieus (listed from west to east). (Names in brackets are named on the document, but were not part of the woods at the time.)
Manorial role of 1597	Charter of 1639	Map of 1757	Map of 1818	Map of 1975
	Bear Sale	Barr Sale	Bar Sale	(Former woodland)
	Sallow Coppice	Sallow Coppice Sale	Sallow Coppice	(Former woodland)
	Overthwart Leys	Cross Lees Sale	Cross Leys Sale	(Former woodland)
	Ash Coppice	Ash Coppice Sale	Ash Coppice	(Former woodland)
	Forty Oak Sale	Forked Oak Sale	Forked Oak Sale	(Former woodland)
	West Wood(?)	Wards Sale	Wards Sale	(Former woodland)
	Cromwell Sink	Crumals Sink Sale	Crummwell Sink Sale	(remnant of) Crummwell Sink Sale
Fisher's Sale	Fisher Sale	Fishers Sale	Fishers Sale	(Former woodland)
		(Thornhaugh Great Heath and Thornhaugh Spong)	(Nether Bedlam)	The Bedlams
	Northeman's Sale	North Gate Sale	North Gate Sale	North Gate Sale
Moyzas	Little Moyses Sale	Little Moiseys Sale	Upper Moiseys Sale	Upper Moiseys Sale
40 acre	Little Forty Acre	Little 40 acres Sale	Upper 40 acre Sale	Upper 40 acres Sale
	Pibblegate	Pibble Gate Sale	Pebble Gate Sale	Pebble Gate Sale
	(John's Wood)	John's Wood Sale	Saint John's Wood	Saint John's Wood
Moyzas	Great Moyses Sales	Great Moiseys Sale	Lower Moiseys Sale	Lower Moiseys Sale
40 acre	Great Forty Acre	Great 40 acres Sale	Forty acre Sale	Lower 40 acres Sale
Cockrode	Cockerood	Cocker Wood Sale	Cocker Wood	Cocker Wood

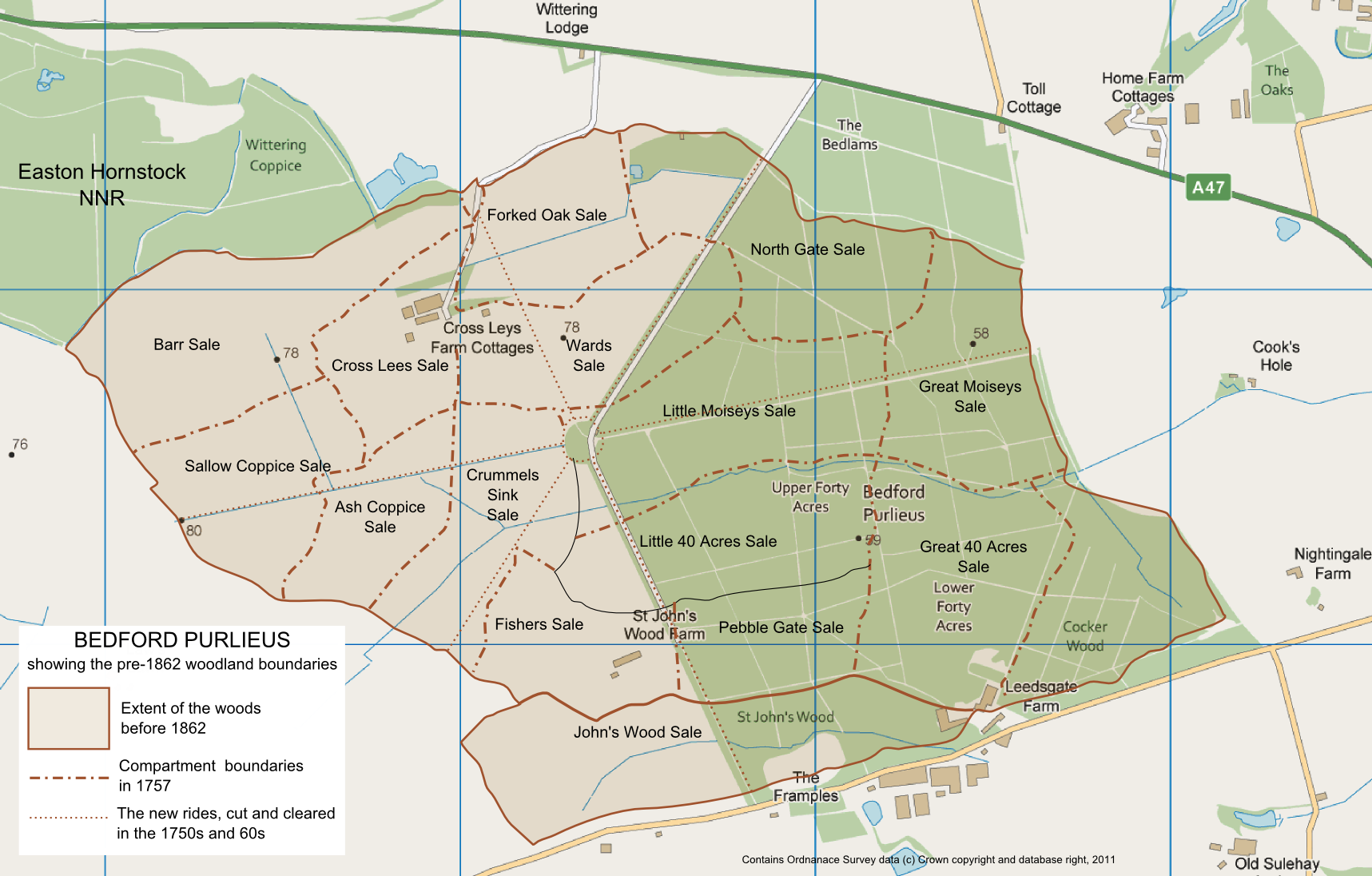
Map showing the boundaries of the former woodland, and the compartments and rides from the estate map of 1757

=== Selling up ===
In 1904 Herbrand Russell, 11th Duke of Bedford decided to sell the whole of the Wansford Estate, including Bedford Purlieus. The estate totalled 4,500 acres (1,800 ha) including 600 acres (240 ha) of woodland, mainly accounted for by Bedford Purlieus. The estate was bought by William Wentworth-Fitzwilliam, 7th Earl Fitzwilliam, a young man who had inherited a vast fortune from his grandfather two years previously. However, only nine years later the Bedford Purlieus were sold on, this time to a timber merchant, who it is thought felled all the saleable trees. Twenty years after that, in 1933, it was bought by the Forestry Commission as described above.

== Royal Forest of Rockingham ==
The woodland now called Bedford Purlieus was part of a large network of medieval woodland across eastern Northamptonshire. The 1086 Domesday Book records the area as 'Forest' but the term Forest of Rockingham is first recorded in 1157. The boundaries changed a great deal, although at its greatest extent, in the 12th century, Rockingham covered a third of Northamptonshire from the walls of Northampton to Stamford, and included the whole of the Soke of Peterborough, including all the woodland around Bedford Purlieus. Everywhere within the Forest, whether woodland, open land or villages, was subject to particular Forest Laws, enforced by the Forester appointed by the King. The King might give away his rights to particular places, however, so that Rockingham Forest gradually reduced in size. King John dissaforested the area east of the Great North Road, leaving Thornhaugh still within the Forest. By 1299, however, it was specifically excluded in the 'Perambulation' (description of the Forest Boundaries).

The Thornhaugh Woods were almost certainly not felled or cleared by this process. There is no ridge and furrow within the woods, and the records of the Thornhaugh Woods continue through following centuries, so it is believed that, unlike most English woodland, it has been woodland continuously throughout the medieval period. Other nearby woods were in a similar situation. Collyweston Great Wood, Easton Hornstocks, Vigo Wood, Rogue Sale and Wittering Coppice are also remnants of this long-disafforested rim of Rockingham Forest. During the 13th and 14th centuries the Thornhaugh Woods were owned by the Semarc family. When a member of the family married Anne of Folkesworth, her dowry included the adjoining woodland of Sir John of Folkesworth. This remained a separately taxed area of the woods until the 18th century, known as John's (and latterly St John's) Wood. It was an heiress of the Semarc lands who, in the 15th century brought the woods to the Russell family, Earls, and later Dukes of Bedford.

== Roman industry and woodland ==
It is thought the area has been woodland at least since Roman times, and very probably for much longer than that, possibly dating to the original woodland growth after the last ice age. Its first certain use was by the Romans.

There are many archaeological features visible within the woods, including medieval wood banks, small quarry pits, signs of Roman industrial use and a Roman dwelling place. The first archaeological excavations were carried out by Edmund Tyrell Artis (1789–1847), the Steward of the nearby FitzWilliam estate, in the first half of the 19th century. He suggested a Roman villa site, and the presence of iron working and furnaces within the wood, and in 1965 the Peterborough Museum Society found and excavated furnaces within the woods. Little was then investigated until the 2011 series of archaeological television programme Time Team, which included a LIDAR survey and an archaeological dig within these woods. They confirmed that iron extraction from pits within the woodland, Roman iron smelting sites, and other evidence of Roman industry implied an industrial centre that was significant for Roman British iron supplies. A Roman bath-house, with surviving painted wall plaster may indicate an overseer's residence.

Could the woodland have survived this level of industrial use? The two resources that the Romans needed were ironstone and fuel. With both available on one site, this would make it an attractive location, but to ensure continuity of fuel supply, it would seem most likely that they encouraged re-growth through a coppice-style system. That would mean that there was continuity of woodland trees and habitats throughout and after the Roman period, and possibly since the ice receded.

== Wartime use ==
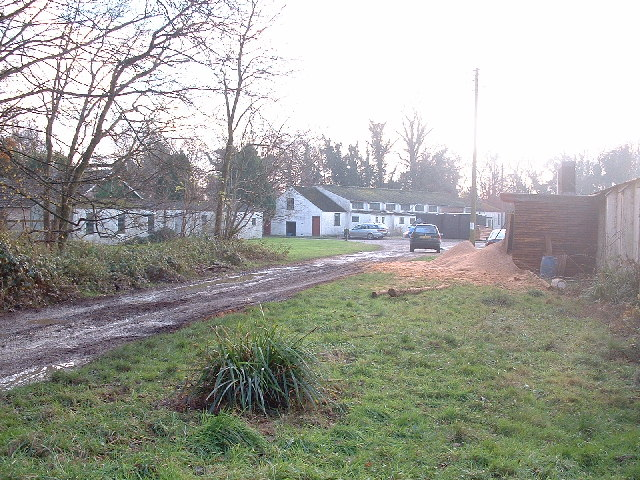
Leedsgate Farm, originally part of St John's Wood, and used by the RAF Kings Cliffe airbase during WW2

During the Second World War Bedford Purlieus woods were used in conjunction with RAF Kings Cliffe air base, south of the woods. The airmen's living accommodation was dispersed around the woods to reduce the risk of being hit in the event of an air raid. Various foundations still remain. The buildings within the St John's Wood compartment, now Leedsgate Farm, included the theatre, gym and chapel for the airbase.

== See also ==
- Castor Hanglands NNR
- Barnack Hills & Holes NNR
- Rockingham Forest
- List of ancient woods in England
- List of Nature Conservation Review sites

== Bibliography ==
- Peterken, G.F.; Welch, R.C., eds. (April 1975). BEDFORD PURLIEUS: its History Ecology and Management (Online pdf scan of the book at NERC.). Monks Wood Symposium. Vol. 7. Huntingdon, Cambs.: Institute of Terrestrial Ecology, National Environmental Research Council. ISSN 0077-0426.
