= Holt Lowes =

UK Site of Special Scientific Interest

Coordinates: 52.894°N 1.101°E

- Site of Special Scientific Interest
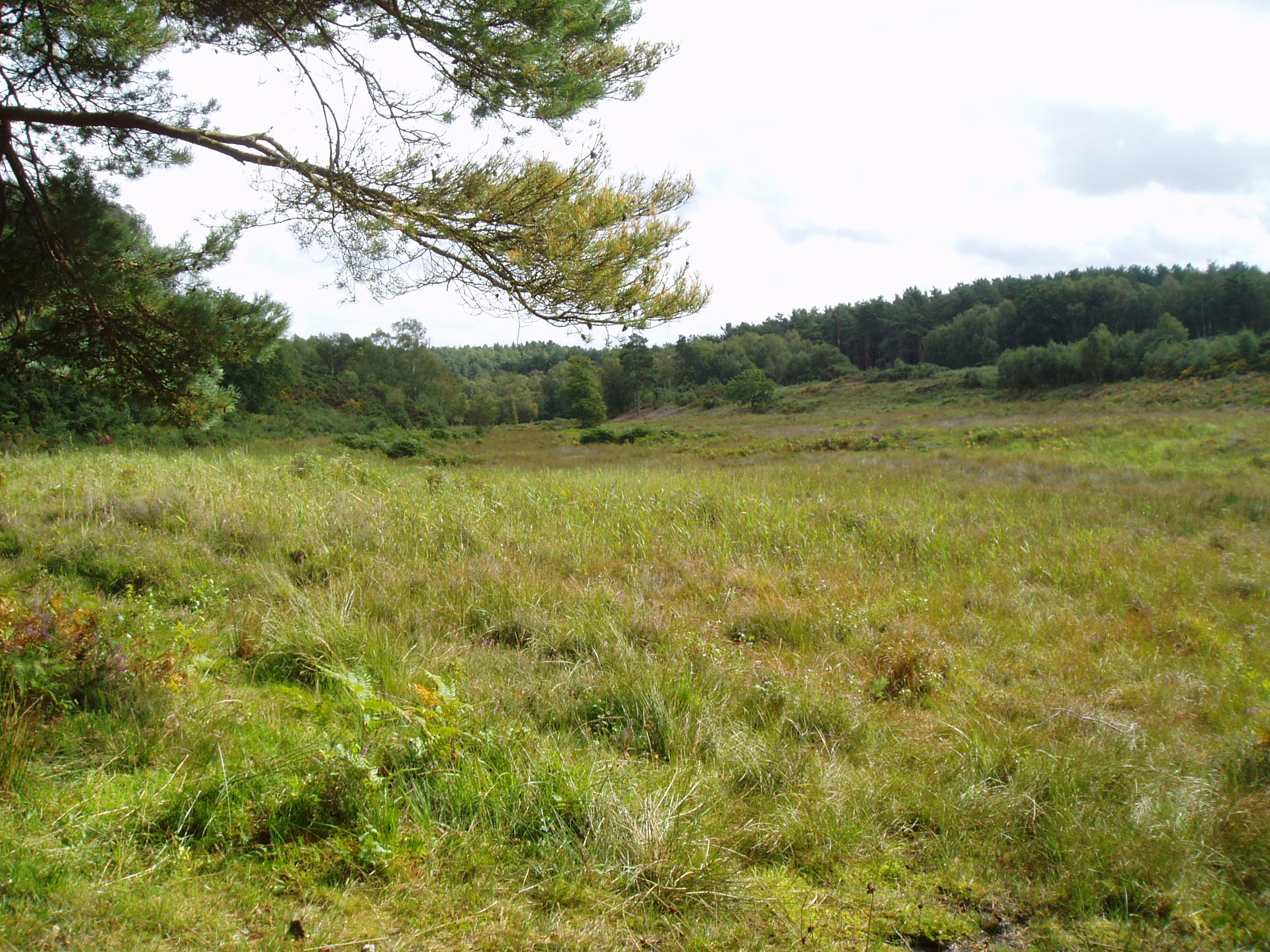
- Location of Holt Lowes.
- Area of search: Norfolk
- Grid reference: TG 087 374
- Interest: Biological
- Area: 49.9 hectares (123 acres)
- Notification date: 1986
- Location map: Magic Map

Holt Lowes is a 49.9-hectare (123-acre) biological Site of Special Scientific Interest west of Cromer in Norfolk, England. It is a Nature Conservation Review site, Grade 2, and part of the Norfolk Valley Fens Special Area of Conservation.

This site is mainly dry and sandy heath in the valley of the River Glaven, with a mire along a tributary which runs through the heath. Ground flora includes wood horsetail at its only known location in East Anglia.

The site is open to the public.
