= Edmund Tyrell Artis =

British paleobotanist-archeologist (1789–1847)

Edmund Tyrell Artis FSA FGS (1789, Sweffling, Suffolk – 24 December 1847, Doncaster, West Riding of Yorkshire) was a British geologist, artist, and pioneer of palaeobotany and archaeology.

== Biography ==
During Artis's lifetime most of the researchers in botany, geology, paleontology, archaeology, or antiquarian studies were born into the upper class in terms of wealth or education, but Artis was born in a small village where his father worked as a carpenter and his mother was illiterate. Both parents died in poverty. In 1805, at age 16, Edmund Artis went to London to work for an uncle in the wine trade and by 1811 had accumulated enough capital to open his own confectionery shop in Dorset Street, Marylebone. In 1811 he married Elizabeth Poole at St James's Church, Piccadilly. A year later, they had a daughter.

In 1813 Artis provided a confectionary creation as the centre-piece at a large dinner party for wealthy people. At the dinner party, this confectionary creation, an iced cake in the shape of a fantastic castle, impressed the 4th Earl Fitzwilliam, a leading Whig politician. Fitzwilliam invited Artis to join his staff at Milton Hall, located near Castor in the Soke of Peterborough which was part of Northamptonshire until late in the 19th century and is now Cambridgeshire. By 1818 Artis was promoted to Milton Hall's house steward.

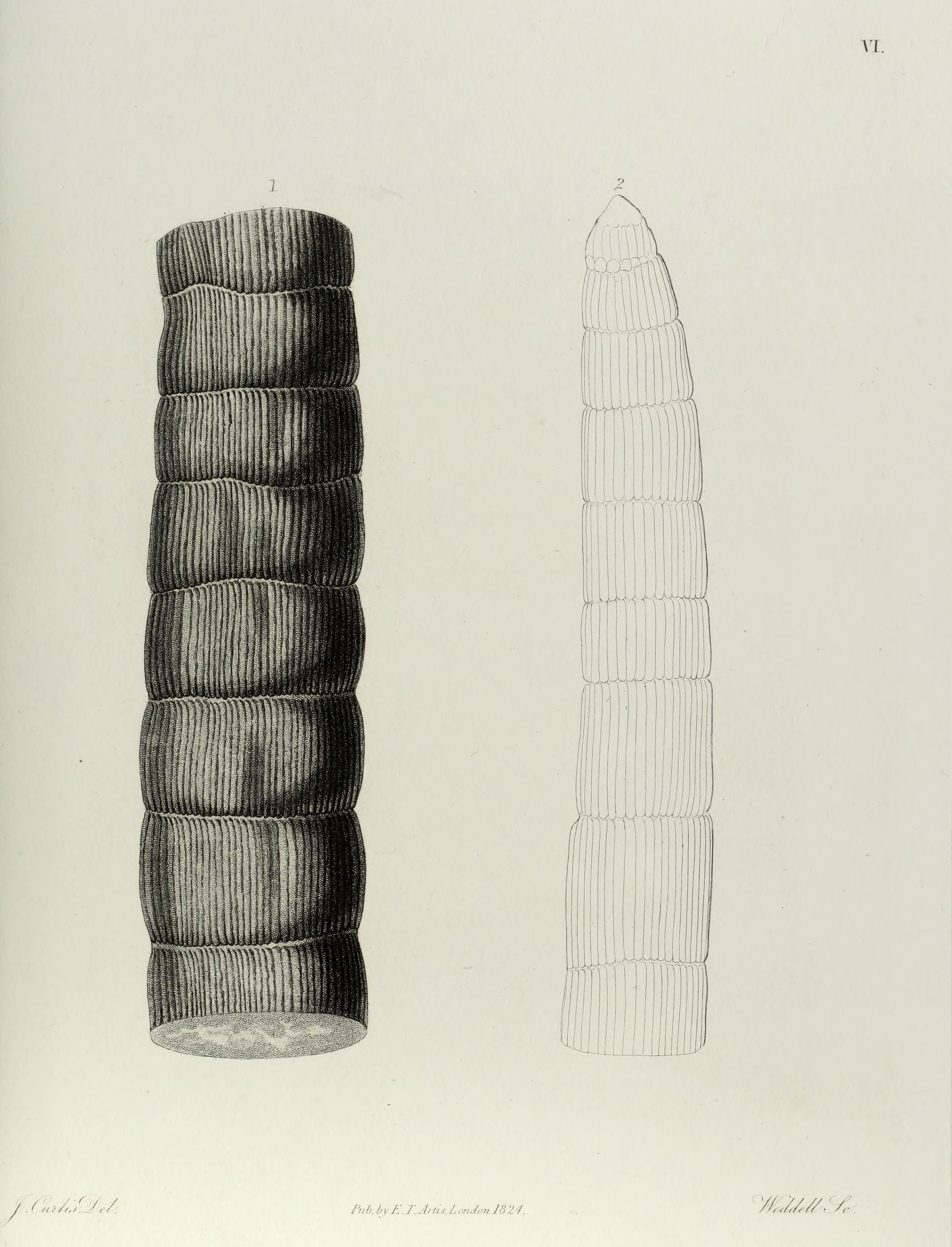
Illustration from Antediluvian Phytology

Artis was talented as an artist and scientist. In 1816 he painted a portrait in oils of the Earl Fitzwilliam. In 1820 Artis made the acquaintance of the poet John Clare and over a period of years became his close friend and advised him on natural history. Clare praised Artis as "everything but a poet". In his 1824 journal, Clare noted that one of the executors of his will was to be Artis.

Artis collected fossils from the gravels of the geological terraces of the River Nene and from the carboniferous deposits in the coal mines owned by the 4th Earl Fitzwilliam. Although based at Milton House, Artis regularly accompanied Fitzwilliam family members on their visits to their other major property, Wentworth Woodhouse in the West Riding of Yorkshire. He was among the first paleontologists to collect fossils directly from underground mines. From 1816 to 1821 he collected fossils in south Yorkshire underground mines and, with the consent of the 4th Earl Fitzwilliam and the aid of Joshua Biram, was able to commandeer the help of some of the miners. Artis assembled a collection of approximately 1000 to 1500 plant fossils, many having exceptional quality. In 1821 in the fields near Castor, he discovered what he called a fossil "elephant". On the basis of his fossil collection, he was elected in 1824 a Fellow of the Geological Society, with sponsorship by William Buckland.

In 1825 Artis published a book Antediluvian Phytology, having 24 plates superbly illustrating some of his plant fossils. Some of the plates were based on paintings by Artis himself but most were based on paintings by John Curtis. Twenty-one of the fossil plant species described by Artis were new to science. Many of the species names he introduced are still used by palaeobotanists — partly because the quality of the illustrations and the clear descriptions eliminated ambiguity. Artis’s research had outstanding value because he collected fossils by his own fieldwork, while most of his contemporary competitors purchased their fossils from collectors. Remarkably, he also developed a version of the Koopmans-Walton technique introduced in 1928.

At Castor, antiquarian and modern archaeological excavations have occurred since the 1600s at a site dating from Roman times. Artis, excavating there in the 1820s, termed the site the 'Praetorium'. The Roman buildings covered an area of 3.77 hectares (9.4 acres). Artis began his investigation of the site when he discovered a mosaic pavement in the churchyard at Castor. From 1823 to 1825 he published the first four parts of The Durobrivae of Antoninus by subscription. In recognition of this work he was elected in 1825 a Fellow of the Society of Antiquaries of London.

Artis held in October 1826 an auction of his household effects and then departed from Milton House due to a sexual indiscretion (probably involving a female servant at Milton House). There exists a record of his earlier siring of an illegitimate child, known as Edmund Hales. Artis sold his fossil collection, some of which remains today in the Natural History Museum, London. The remaining parts of The Durobrivae of Antoninus were published in 1827 and 1828.

By 1827 Fitzwilliam moved Artis to Doncaster to serve as manager of the horse-racing club there. Each September, upper class rich people gathered during the St Leger race meeting, under the patronage of the 4th Earl Fitzwilliam. Artis purchased the Doncaster Race-Club House, which provided September lodging for such rich people. Artis also served as secretary of the Doncaster Race-Club, whose members organized events. In 1829 he provided a magnificent celebratory dinner for the Duke of Wellington. Artis's cooking became famous among a circle of upper class people.

In 1829 Artis sold his London rooms and his fossil collection. Most of his fossil specimens have been lost. There are two at the Natural History Museum in London, and, when he died in 1847, fourteen other specimens were donated to the Yorkshire Museum.

His business in Doncaster brought him considerable wealth. He bought two houses in Castor and maintained a carriage. After years of success, financial difficulties developed, and the 5th Earl Fitzwilliam withdrew from horse racing. By the late 1830s, upon the accession to the throne of Queen Victoria in 1837, the popularity of horse racing declined. Artis's daughter married in 1836. In 1838 he became a friend of Charles Roach Smith. By 1839 Artis had returned to Northamptonshire and was living in Castor in a small cottage.

Artis was one of the founders in 1843 of the British Archaeological Association. In the 1840s, he resumed his archaeological work, excavating Roman remains in Northamptonshire. This later work was supported by another local landowner, Francis Russell, 7th Duke of Bedford, instead of the 5th Earl Fitzwilliam. Artis's grave is near the porch of St Kyneburgha’s Church in Castor.

His drawings are stored at the Natural History Museum.

== Selected publications ==
- Antediluvian phytology, illustrated by a collection of the fossil remains of plants peculiar to the coal formations of Great Britain. London: J. Cumberland; Rodwell & Martin; W. Phillips; Taylor; Hessey; Nichols & Son. 1825. LCCN 06010134. online text at Hathitrust
  - 1838 reprint. London: Nichols & Son. 1838.
- The Durobrivae of Antoninus: identified and illustrated in a series of plates, exhibiting the excavated remains of that Roman station, in the vicinity of Castor, Northamptonshire: including the mosaic pavements, inscriptions, paintings in fresco, baths, rion and glass furnaces, potters' kilns, implements for coining, and the manufacture of earthen vessels, war and other instruments in brass, iron, ivory, etc. London. 1828.

== See also ==
- Durobrivae (Water Newton)
- Bedford Purlieus National Nature Reserve
