= RAF Kings Cliffe =

Former Royal Air Force station

RAF Kings Cliffe USAAF Station 367
- Kings Cliffe, Northamptonshire in England
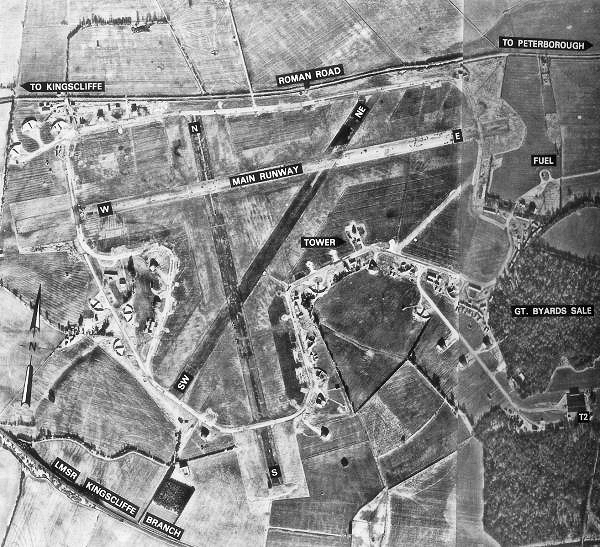
- Kings Cliffe Airfield - 16 January 1947

Site information
- Type: Royal Air Force station
- Code: KO
- Owner: Air Ministry
- Operator: Royal Air Force; United States Army Air Forces 1943-
- Controlled by: RAF Fighter Command; 1941-43 & 1943 * No. 12 Group RAF; Eighth Air Force

Location
- Shown within Northamptonshire RAF Kings Cliffe (the United Kingdom)
- Coordinates: 52°34′13″N 000°28′57″W

Site history
- Built: 1940/41
- Built by: George Wimpey & Co Ltd
- In use: October 1941 - January 1959
- Battles/wars: European theatre of World War II

Airfield information
- Elevation: 76 metres (249 ft) AMSL
Runways
Direction	Length and surface
NE/SE	Concrete
E/W	Concrete
N/S	Concrete

Royal Air Force King's Cliffe or more simply RAF King's Cliffe is a former Royal Air Force station located near Kings Cliffe, Northamptonshire, 12 miles (19 km) west of Peterborough in Cambridgeshire. The airfield was built with hard-surfaced runways and a perimeter track, these were extended early in 1943.

== History ==
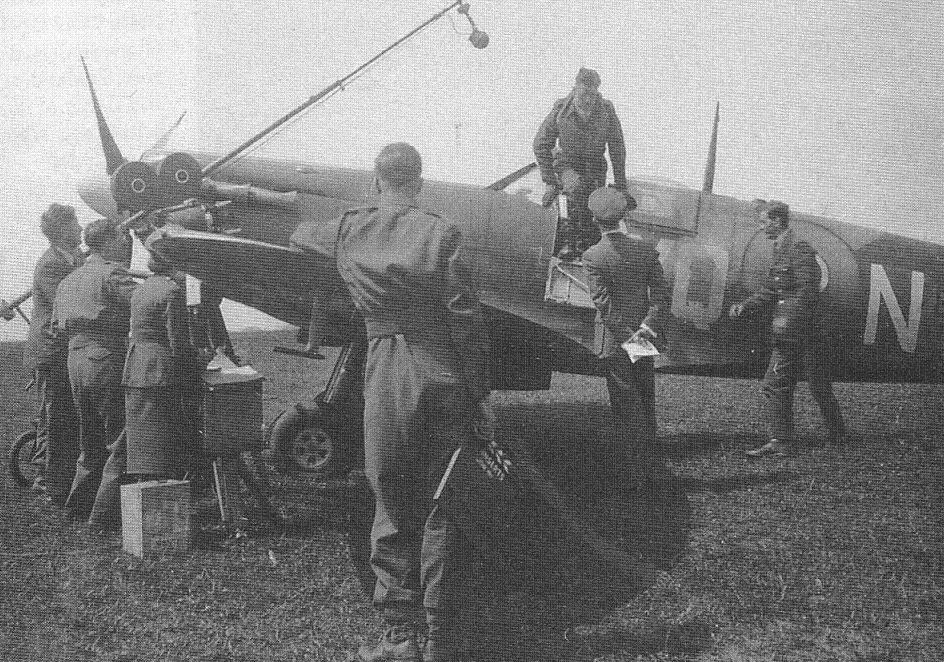
RAF ace Johnnie Johnson climbing out of the cockpit of his Spitfire at Kings Cliffe, 1941

=== RAF use - early wartime ===
Construction work on the airfield commenced in 1940. The base opened in October 1941 as a satellite to RAF Wittering.The first unit to operate from the newly opened airfield was No. 266 Squadron RAF, who arrived in October 1941 followed in due course by No. 616 Squadron RAF in early 1942 and No. 485 (New Zealand) Squadron in July 1942. The RAF presence ceased in August 1943. The airfield was extended during 1943.

The following units were here at some point:

- No. 7 (Pilots) Advanced Flying Unit RAF
- No. 56 Operational Training Unit RAF
- No. 75 Squadron RAF
- No. 91 Squadron RAF
- No. 93 Maintenance Unit RAF
- No. 349 Squadron RAF
- No. 616 Squadron RAF
- No. 2701 Squadron RAF Regiment
- No. 2719 Squadron RAF Regiment
- No. 2725 Squadron RAF Regiment
- No. 2809 Squadron RAF Regiment
- No. 2877 Squadron RAF Regiment
- No. 2881 Squadron RAF Regiment
- No. 2882 Squadron RAF Regiment
- No. 4094 Anti-Aircraft Flight RAF Regiment
- No. 4102 Anti-Aircraft Flight RAF Regiment

=== USAAF use ===
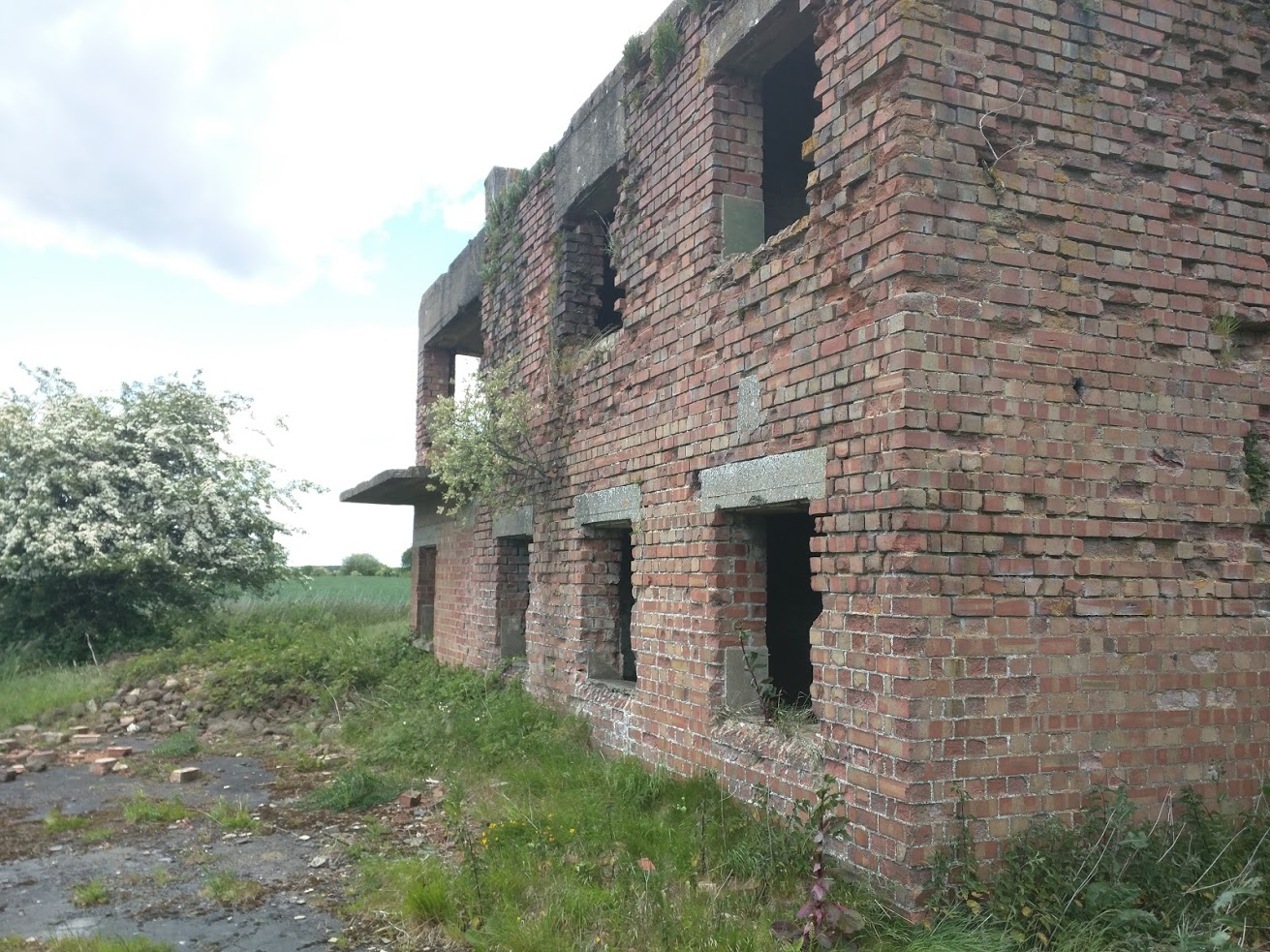
Remains of the control tower at RAF Kings Cliffe

Kings Cliffe was assigned USAAF designation Station 367. It was the most northerly and furthest west of all Eighth Air Force fighter stations. It was in the 1st Air Division heavy bomber base area and more than fifty miles west of any other fighter airfield. In spite of the reduced range of escort flights operating from such a westerly airfield, there does not appear to have been any attempt to move the Group to another site nearer the coast.

==== 347th Fighter Squadron ====
Kings Cliffe received its first American unit in December 1942 when the 347th Fighter Squadron of the 350th Fighter Group arrived with their Bell P-39 Airacobra aircraft. The squadron only stayed for a short time before they were reallocated to the 12th Air Force and departed to North Africa to take part in the fighting that followed the launch of Operation Torch.

==== 56th Fighter Group ====
In January 1943 the 56th Fighter Group of the United States Army Air Forces's Eighth Air Force arrived at Kings Cliffe from Bridgeport AAF Connecticut. The group was under the command of 67th Fighter Wing of the VIII Fighter Command. As the airfield was considered too small to accommodate a full USAAF Fighter Group the 61st Fighter Squadron was based at nearby RAF Wittering

The group consisted of the following squadrons:

- 61st Fighter Squadron (HV)
- 62d Fighter Squadron (LM)
- 63d Fighter Squadron (UN)

The 56th Fighter group spent its time at Kings Cliffe learning RAF fighter control procedures and training for combat with new Republic P-47 Thunderbolts and did not fly any operational missions. In April 1943, the group was transferred to the 65th Fighter Wing and moved to RAF Horsham St Faith.

==== 20th Fighter Group ====
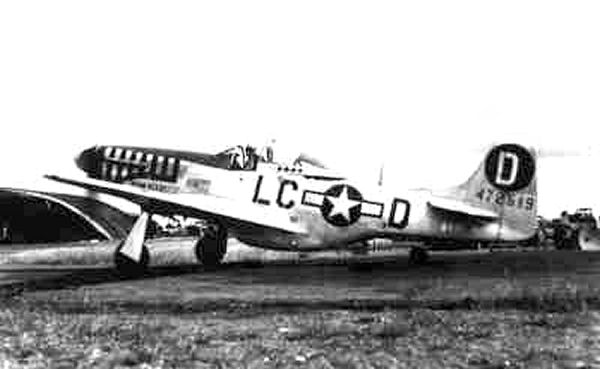
North American P-51D-20-NA Mustang Serial 44-72519 of the 77th Fighter Squadron

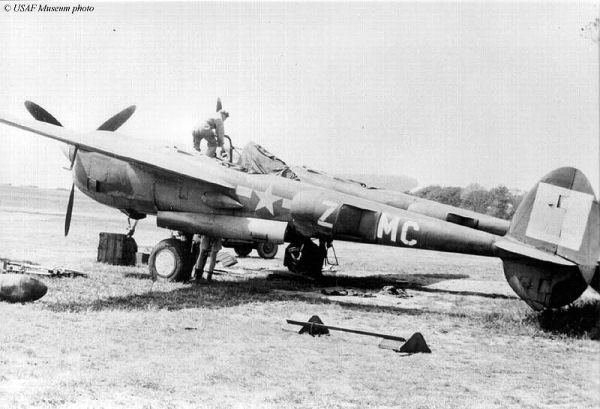
Lockheed P-38J Lightning of the 79th Fighter Squadron

On 26 August 1943, the 20th Fighter Group arrived from March AAF California. The group was under the command of the 67th Fighter Wing of the VIII Fighter Command.

The group consisted of the following squadrons:

- 55th Fighter Squadron (KI)
- 77th Fighter Squadron (LC)
- 79th Fighter Squadron (MC)

As had been the case with the 56th Fighter Group one squadron, the 55th. was billeted at RAF Wittering because of the shortage of accommodation at Kings Cliffe, later moving to the base when additional facilities had been built. The 20th Fighter Group entered combat with Lockheed P-38 Lightnings late in November 1943, initially supplying one squadron to fly alongside the more experienced 55th Fighter Group operating from RAF Nuthampstead. From December 1943 the group became fully operational and was engaged primarily in escorting heavy and medium bombers to targets on the Continent. The group frequently strafed targets of opportunity while on escort missions.

The group retained escort as its primary function until the end of the war, but in March 1944 began to fly fighter-bomber missions, which became almost as frequent as escort operations. The squadrons strafed and dive-bombed airfields, trains, vehicles, barges, tugs, bridges, flak positions, gun emplacements, barracks, radio stations, and other targets in France, Belgium, and Germany.

The 20th became known as the "Loco Group" because of its numerous and successful attacks on locomotives. The Distinguished Unit Citation was awarded to the group for its performance on 8 April 1944 when they struck airfields in central Germany and then, after breaking up an attack by enemy interceptors, proceeded to hit railroad equipment, oil facilities, power plants, factories, and other targets.

Aircraft from the 20th flew patrols over the English Channel during the invasion of Normandy in June 1944, and supported the invasion force later that month by escorting bombers that struck interdictory targets in France, Belgium, and the Netherlands, and by attacking troops, transportation targets, and airfields.

The 20th Fighter Group converted to North American P-51 Mustangs in July 1944 and continued to fly escort and fighter-bomber missions as the enemy retreated across France. The group's Mustangs could be identified by their black nose with a narrow white band behind it, these markings were extended in October 1944 to include a number of black and white stripes on the cowling.

The group participated in the airborne attack on the Netherlands in September 1944, and escorted bombers to Germany and struck rail lines, trains, vehicles, barges, power stations, and other targets in and beyond the Siegfried Line during the period October–December 1944.

The unit took part in the Battle of the Bulge by escorting bombers to the battle area. Flew patrols to support the airborne attack across the Rhine in March 1945, and carried out escort and fighter-bomber missions as enemy resistance collapsed in April.

The 20th Fighter Group returned to Camp Kilmer, New Jersey and was inactivated on 18 December 1945.

==== Glenn Miller ====
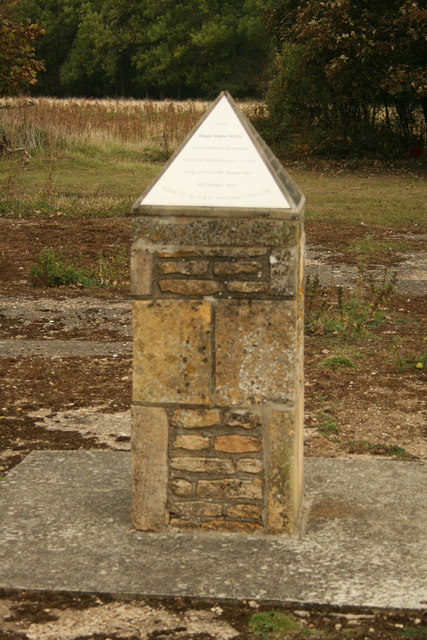
Glenn Miller Memorial

Glenn Miller played his last airfield concert in the Callendar Hamilton hangar at Kings Cliffe. This concert took place in the afternoon on Tuesday 3 October 1944. There is a memorial on the hangar base close to the actual location where Miller would have stood during the performance.

=== Royal Air Force use post war ===
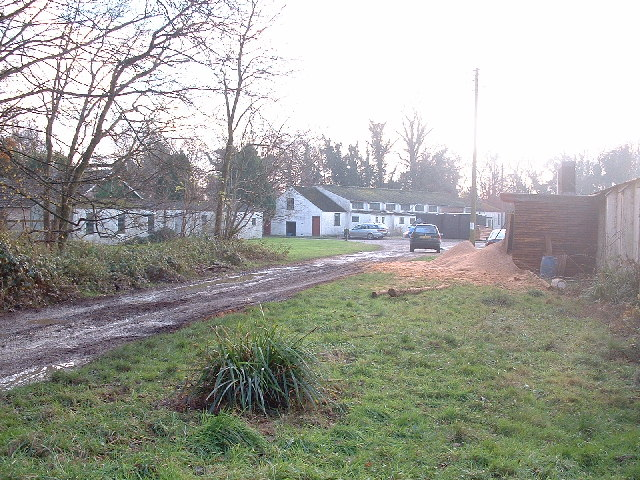
Leedsgate Farm, Bedford Purlieus; the long building was the gym, cinema and chapel for RAF Kings Cliffe

After the war, the field was used by the RAF for armament storage until being sold and returned to agriculture in January 1959.

== Current use ==
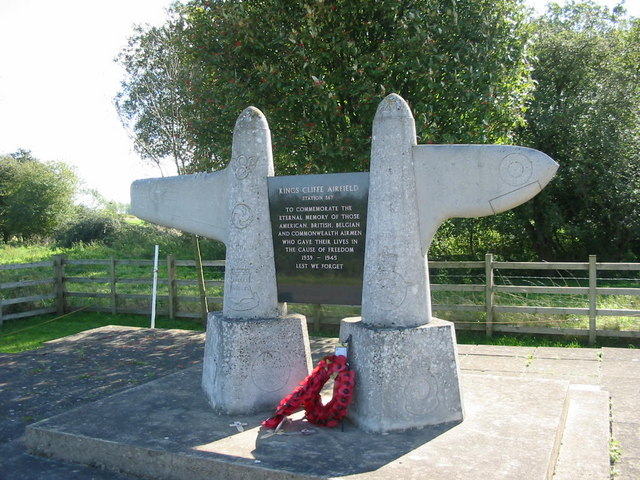
Memorial at Kings Cliffe airfield

Kings Cliffe airfield has largely returned to agriculture, however the outlines and concreted areas of the runways are readily identifiable in aerial images. The perimeter track has been reduced to a single-track agricultural road with the hardstandings removed for hardcore. The technical site and hangars have been razed but the abandoned control tower still exists. Dispersed buildings in Bedford Purlieus include the combined gymnasium/cinema/chapel which still survives on the former airfield's Communal Site.

A memorial to the airfield and the squadrons operating there was unveiled by the Duke of Gloucester in 1983.

In July 2024 a small museum was established on the site of the old airfield. The King's Cliffe Airfield Museum aims to preserve the history of the airfield and tell the stories of the personnel and units that were based there.

== See also ==
- List of former Royal Air Force stations
