= Water Newton Treasure =

Roman silver hoard

Water Newton Treasure: Silver jug
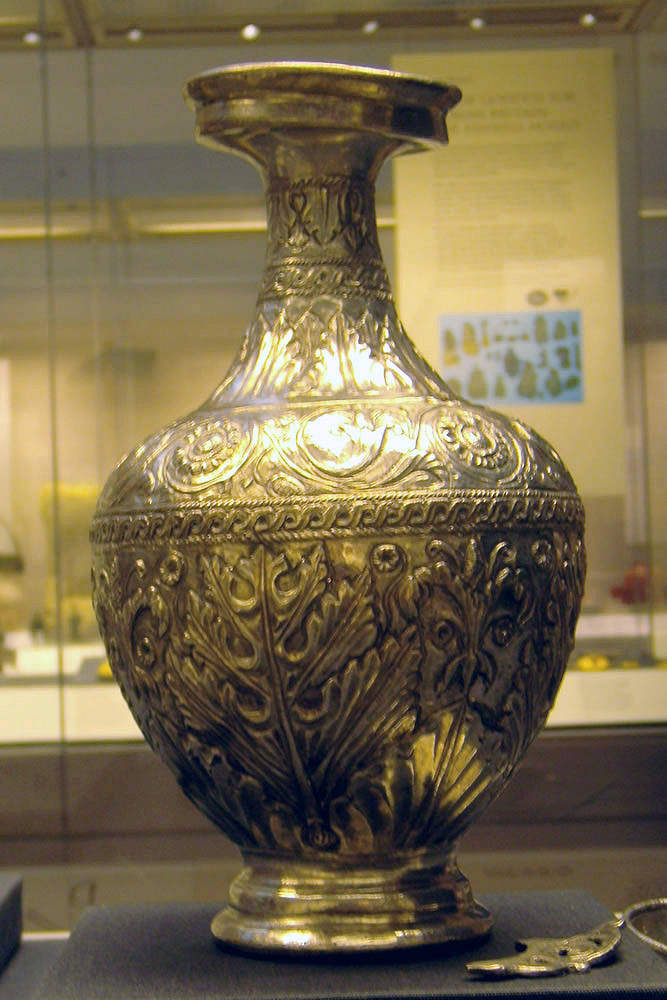
- Silver jug from the treasure (handle missing)
- Material: Silver
- Size: height:203 millimetres (8.0 in) width:116 millimetres (4.6 in)
- Created: Romano-British period
- Discovered: February 1975
- Present location: British Museum
- Identification: 1975,1002.1

The Water Newton Treasure is a hoard of fourth-century Roman silver, discovered near the location of the Roman town of Durobrivae at Water Newton in the English county of Cambridgeshire in 1975. The hoard consisted of 27 silver items and one small gold plaque. Because of inscriptions found on some of the pieces in the collection it has been suggested that they may have been used in a local church, and they therefore comprise the earliest probable group of Christian liturgical silver yet found in the Roman Empire.

The hoard was discovered during ploughing in February 1975; several items were damaged by the plough. It was probably buried by an inhabitant of the nearby Roman fortified garrison town of Durobrivae. There are nine silver vessels, and the remainder of the items are votive tokens engraved and embossed with the labarum (the chi-rho cross), mostly of triangular shape. The larger items include jugs, bowls, dishes, a strainer, and an unengraved standing two-handled cup of the form (cantharus) later used as chalices.

Due to the importance of this find, it is now in the British Museum, with part of the original hoard having been on display until January 2019 at Peterborough Museum.

== Major items ==
Decorated silver jug, height 20.3 cm high, 11.6 cm maximum width, weight 534 g. (1975,1002.1). Illustrated above, the jug is the most elaborately decorated largely complete piece in the group, with acanthus-type foliage motifs in several zones, and leaf-scrolls. The single handle has become detached; a fragment was part of the treasure.

Lower part of a hanging bowl, width 18–19 cm, weight 220.4 g. (1975,1002.2). Essentially the bottom part only of a large but very thin shallow hanging bowl, designed to be seen from the outside, and possibly used as a lamp. The decoration is repoussé worked from the outside, leaving the pattern in relief when seen from the inside. Other fragments were found, including rings for suspension and bits of chain, and parts of the rim. There are nine zones of decoration and mouldings. A few very similar bowls have been found in France and Ireland; the decoration may have imitated that of cut glass bowls. The piece is now displayed around a perspex support that demonstrates the original full dimensions—see the gallery section.

Inscribed silver bowl, height 11.5 cm, width 17 cm, weight 663 g. (1975,1002.5). Badly damaged at the base on one side, the bowl has inscriptions: under the base, the name "PUBLIANUS", and round the rim a regular hexameter line:"SANCTUM ALTARE TUUM DOMINE SUBNIXUS HONORO" engraved alongside two chi-rho monograms. The exact context of the inscriptions have been debated but "O Lord, I Publianus, relying on you, honour your holy altar [or church]." is probably the sense. The bowl is therefore marked as a votive offering, and associates the treasure with a church, or perhaps the private chapel of a large house. Whilst this is not like other ancient chalices known for Christian worship, it may indeed be the oldest known chalice in existence. Its design is like that of a chalice depicted in the mosaics of the Basilica of San Vitale in Ravenna. Melchizedek and Abel stand making offerings, not to a pagan altar with a fire, but to a table covered with a white cloth. On it are representations of two loaves, and jewelled example of a bowl with handles identical to the Water Newton Chalice.

The majority of the objects found are small plaques which were probably fixed to the wall of a church as votive offerings. Some have holes for nails, like the single gold plaque, and one an inscription saying that "Anicilla has fulfilled the vow which she promised" (1975,10 2.13). The triangular "leaf" form of most of these was originally pagan, but the chi-rho monogram on these examples makes them the first finds to show that the practice had been adopted by Christians.

== Gallery ==
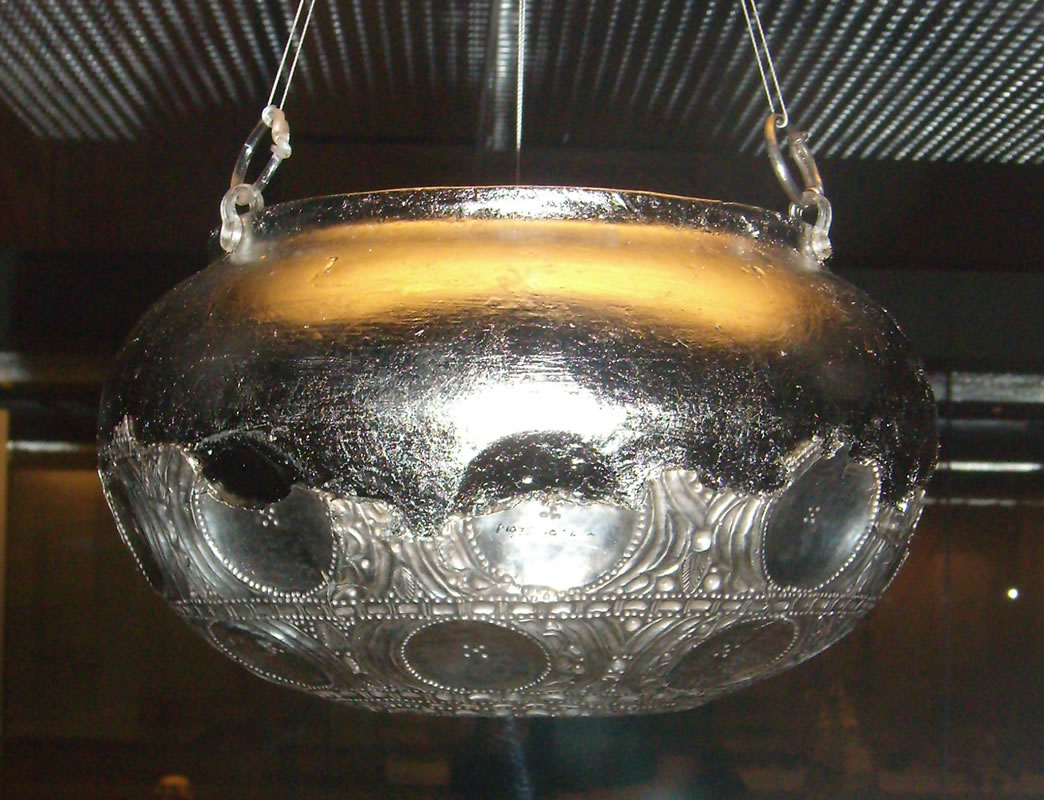
The hanging bowl on display

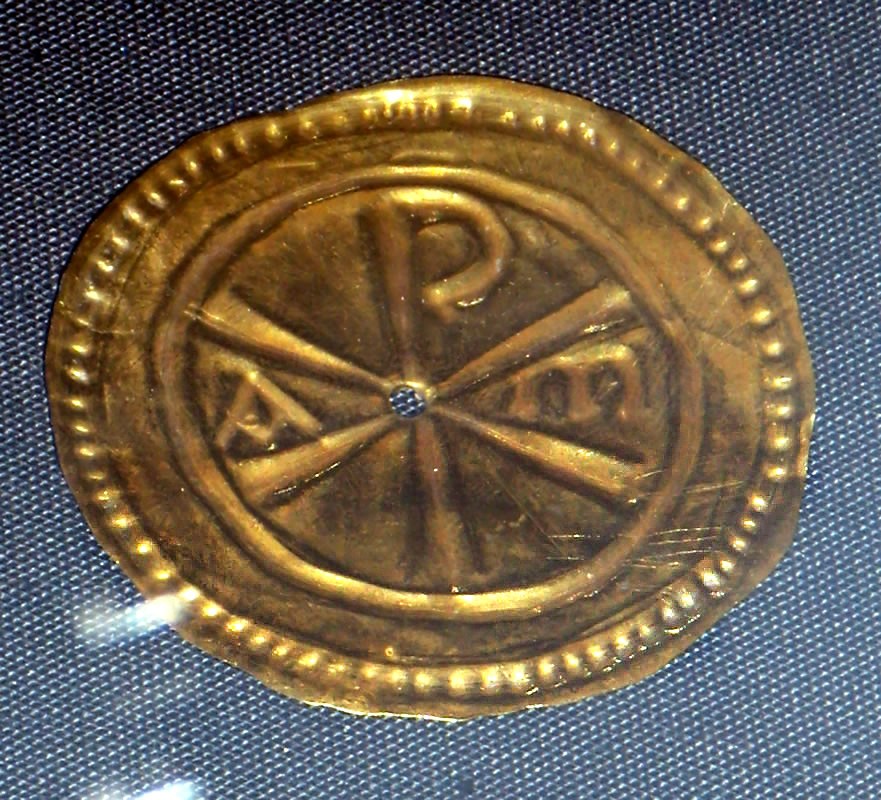
Votive plaque, the only gold item
BM ref:1975,1002.11

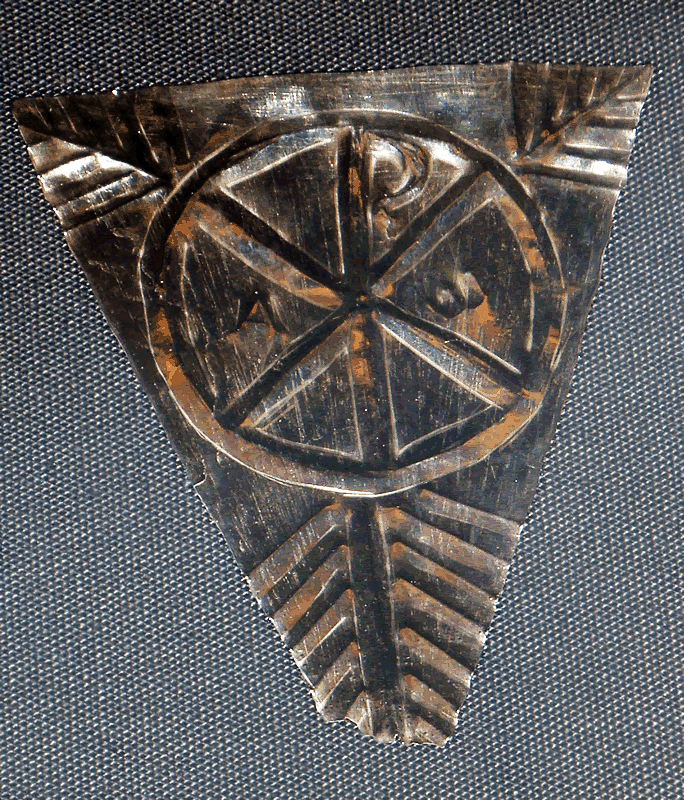
Votive silver plaque, typical of many in the treasure
BM ref:1975,1002.14

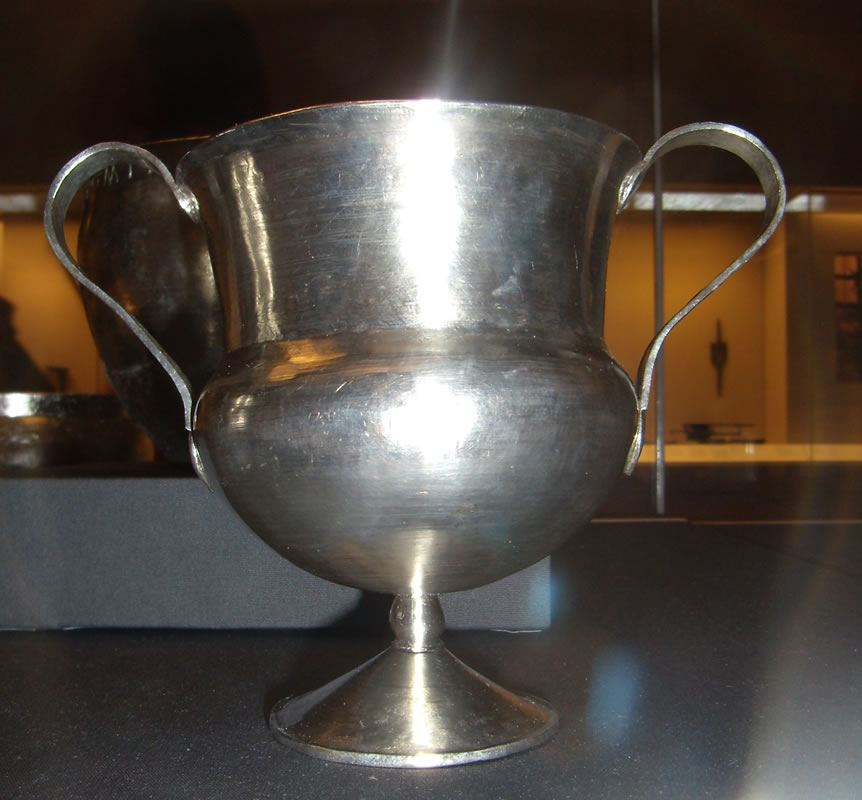
Silver cantharus, height 12.5 cm, weight 316 g.
BM ref:1975,1002.6

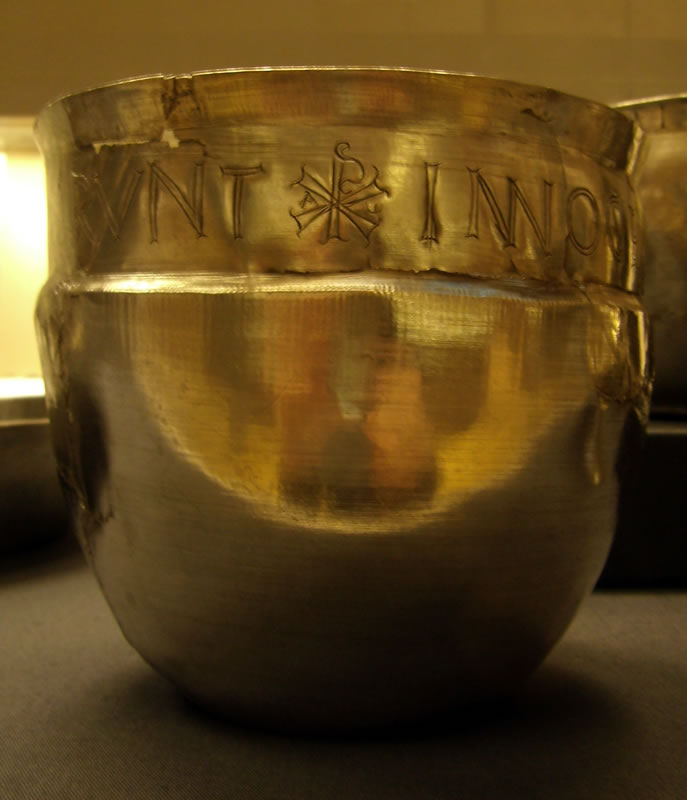
Inscribed silver cup

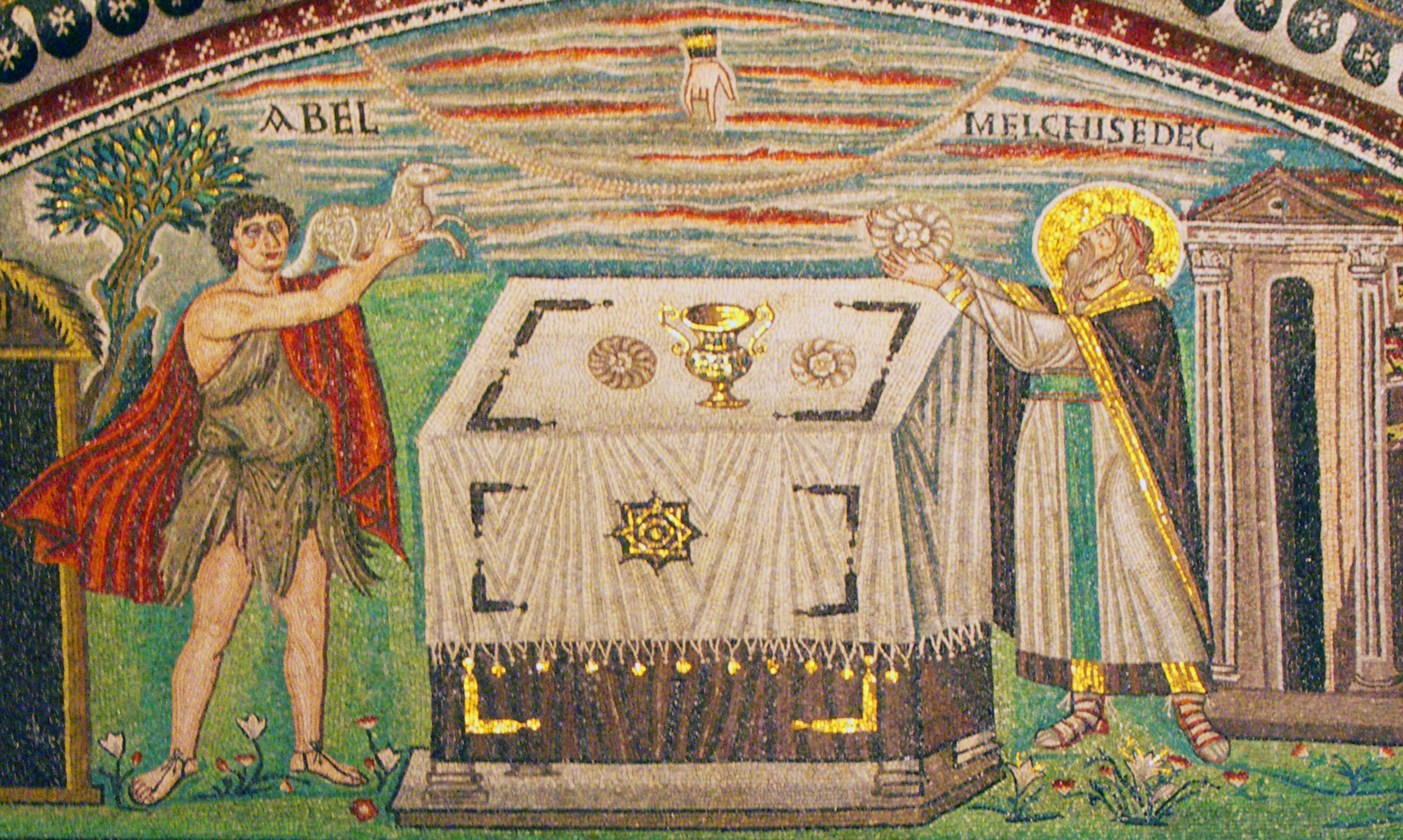
Jewelled chalice depicted at Ravenna in Italy, of similar design to the Water Newton bowl

== See also ==
- List of hoards in Britain
