= Water Newton =

Village in Cambridgeshire. England

Coordinates: 52.56°N 0.37°W

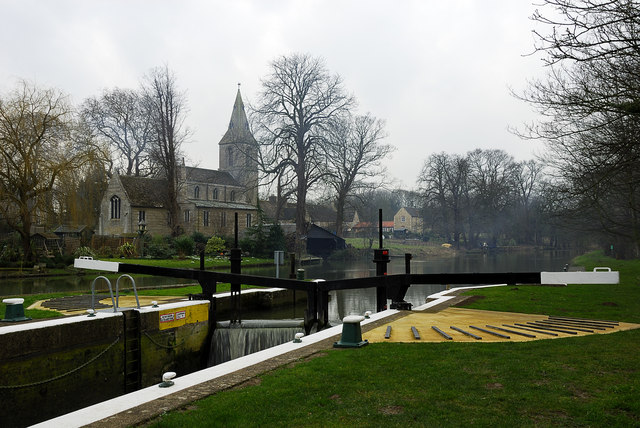
- Water Newton Lock and church

- Location within Cambridgeshire
- OS grid reference: TL108972
- Shire county: Cambridgeshire
- Region: East
- Country: England
- Sovereign state: United Kingdom
- Post town: Peterborough
- Postcode district: PE8
- Police: Cambridgeshire
- Fire: Cambridgeshire
- Ambulance: East of England
- UK Parliament: North West Cambridgeshire

Water Newton is a village and civil parish in Cambridgeshire, England. Water Newton lies approximately 5 miles (8 km) west of Peterborough. Water Newton is situated within Huntingdonshire which is a non-metropolitan district of Cambridgeshire as well as being a historic county of England. As the population of the village was only 88 at the 2011 Census it is included in the civil parish of Chesterton.

The village is sandwiched between the River Nene to the north and the A1 trunk road to the south. The River Nene marks the boundary between Huntingdonshire and the City of Peterborough.

== History ==
=== Roman archaeology ===
Main articles: Durobrivae and Water Newton Treasure

During ploughing in February 1975, a hoard of 4th-century Roman silver was discovered, which is known as the 'Water Newton Treasure'. They were probably buried by an inhabitant of the nearby Roman fortified garrison town of Durobrivae. The silver plates and bowls, votive tokens engraved and embossed with the labarum (the chi-rho cross), and an unengraved standing two-handled cup of the form (cantharus) later used as chalices comprise the earliest group of Christian liturgical silver yet found in the Roman Empire. Due to the importance of this find, it is now in the British Museum, with replicas at Peterborough Museum.

=== Middle Ages ===
In 1085, William the Conqueror ordered that a survey should be carried out across his kingdom to discover who owned which parts and what it was worth. The survey took place in 1086 and the results were recorded in what, since the 12th century, has become known as the Domesday Book. Starting with the king himself, for each landholder within a county there is a list of their estates or manors; and, for each manor, there is a summary of the resources of the manor, the amount of annual rent that was collected by the lord of the manor both in 1066 and in 1086, together with the taxable value.

Water Newton was listed in the Domesday Book in the Hundred of Normancross in Huntingdonshire; the name of the settlement was written as Newtone in the Domesday Book. In 1086 there was just one manor at Water Newton; the annual rent paid to the lord of the manor in 1066 had been £5 and the rent had increased to £7 in 1086.

The Domesday Book does not explicitly detail the population of a place but it records that there were 22 households at Water Newton. There is no consensus about the average size of a household at that time; estimates range from 3.5 to 5.0 people per household. Using these figures then an estimate of the population of Water Newton in 1086 is that it was within the range of 77 and 110 people.

The Domesday Book uses a number of units of measure for areas of land that are now unfamiliar terms, such as hides and ploughlands. In different parts of the country, these were terms for the area of land that a team of eight oxen could plough in a single season and are equivalent to 120 acres (49 hectares); this was the amount of land that was considered to be sufficient to support a single family. By 1086, the hide had become a unit of tax assessment rather than an actual land area; a hide was the amount of land that could be assessed as £1 for tax purposes. The survey records that there were seven ploughlands at Water Newton in 1086 and that there was the capacity for a further ploughland. In addition to the arable land, there was 60 acres (24 hectares) of meadows and two water mills at Water Newton.

The tax assessment in the Domesday Book was known as geld or danegeld and was a type of land-tax based on the hide or ploughland. It was originally a way of collecting a tribute to pay off the Danes when they attacked England, and was only levied when necessary. Following the Norman Conquest, the geld was used to raise money for the King and to pay for continental wars; by 1130, the geld was being collected annually. Having determined the value of a manor's land and other assets, a tax of so many shillings and pence per pound of value would be levied on the land holder. While this was typically two shillings in the pound the amount did vary; for example, in 1084 it was as high as six shillings in the pound. For the manor at Water Newton the total tax assessed was five geld.

By 1086, there was already a church and a priest at Water Newton.

== Government ==
Water Newton is a small parish and has parish meeting rather than a parish council.

Water Newton was in the historic and administrative county of Huntingdonshire until 1965. From 1965, the village was part of the new administrative county of Huntingdon and Peterborough. Then in 1974, following the Local Government Act 1972, Water Newton became a part of the county of Cambridgeshire.

The second tier of local government is Huntingdonshire District Council which is a non-metropolitan district of Cambridgeshire and has its headquarters in Huntingdon. Huntingdonshire District Council has 52 councillors representing 29 district wards. Huntingdonshire District Council collects the council tax, and provides services such as building regulations, local planning, environmental health, leisure and tourism. Water Newton is a part of the district ward of Elton and Folksworth and is represented on the district council by one councillor. District councillors serve for four-year terms following elections to Huntingdonshire District Council.

For Water Newton the highest tier of local government is Cambridgeshire County Council which has administration buildings in Cambridge. The county council provides county-wide services such as major road infrastructure, fire and rescue, education, social services, libraries and heritage services. Cambridgeshire County Council consists of 69 councillors representing 60 electoral divisions. Water Newton is part of the electoral division of Norman Cross and is represented on the county council by two councillors.

At Westminster Water Newton is in the parliamentary constituency of North West Cambridgeshire, and elects one Member of Parliament (MP) by the first past the post system of election. Water Newton is represented in the House of Commons by Shailesh Vara (Conservative). Shailesh Vara has represented the constituency since 2005. The previous member of parliament was Brian Mawhinney (Conservative) who represented the constituency between 1997 and 2005.

== Demography ==
=== Population ===
In the period 1801 to 1901 the population of Water Newton was recorded every ten years by the UK census. During this time the population was in the range of 88 (the lowest was in 1811) and 161 (the highest was in 1871).

From 1901, a census was taken every ten years with the exception of 1941 (due to the Second World War).

Parish	1911	1921	1931	1951	1961	1971	1981	1991	2001	2011
Water Newton	91	105	78	79	69	69	51	72	74	88

All population census figures from report Historic Census figures Cambridgeshire to 2011 by Cambridgeshire Insight.

In 2011, the parish covered an area of 885 acres (358 hectares) and the population density of Water Newton in 2011 was 63.6 persons per square mile (24.6 per square kilometre).
