= Pipewell Woods =

Coordinates: 52.467°N 0.775°W

- Site of Special Scientific Interest
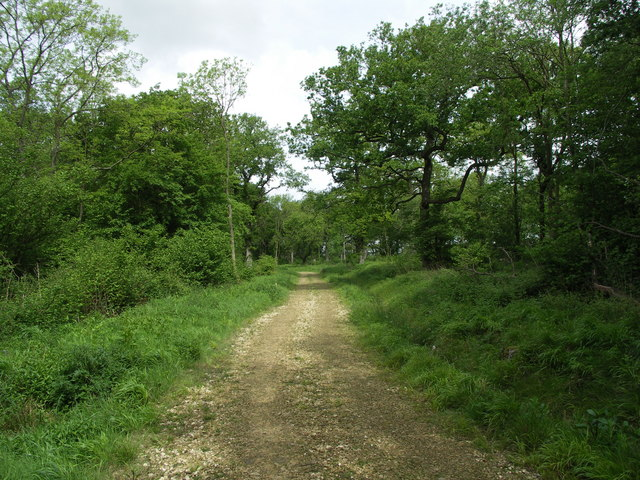
- Location of Pipewell Woods.
- Area of search: Northamptonshire
- Grid reference: SP 833 861
- Interest: Biological
- Area: 85.3 hectares
- Notification date: 1985
- Location map: Magic Map

Pipewell Woods is an 85.3-hectare (211-acre) biological Site of Special Scientific Interest south-west of Corby in Northamptonshire. It is composed of Pipewell Wood itself, Little Haws Wood, Foxhole Wood, Barrowdykes Wood, Monk's Arbour Wood and Rawhaw Wood. It is a Nature Conservation Review site, Grade 2.

The woods are an example of wet ash-maple woodland both in its typical form and a nationally rare one. It has diverse flora including the locally rare giant bellflower, herb paris and wood speedwell. Open grassy areas provide additional habitats for birds and insects.

A road and a public footpath from Pipewell go through the site.
