= Hardwick Wood =

Nature reserve in Cambridgeshire, England

Coordinates: 52.199°N 0.022°W

- Site of Special Scientific Interest
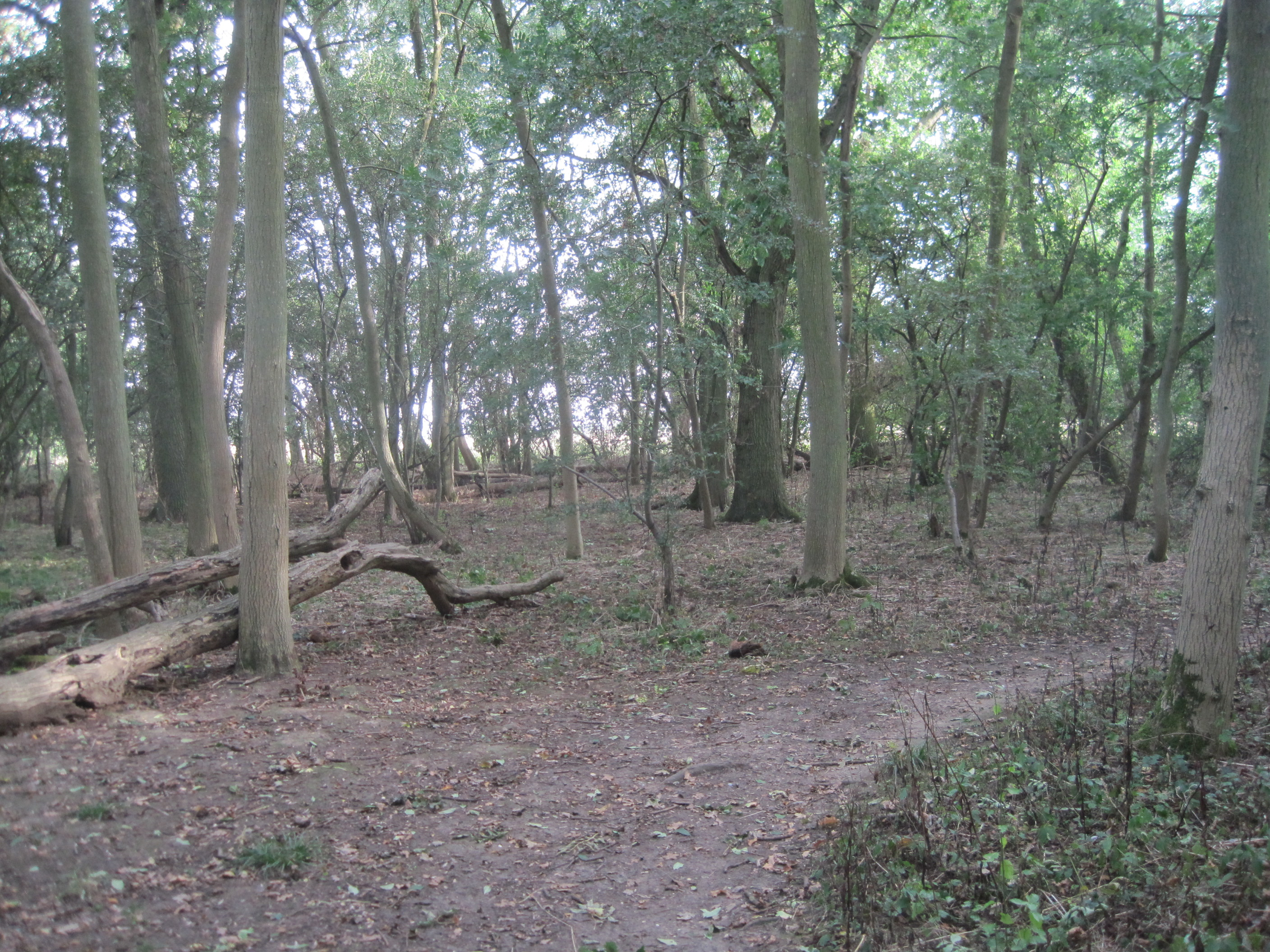
- Location of Hardwick Wood.
- Area of search: Cambridgeshire
- Grid reference: TL353575
- Interest: Biological
- Area: 15.5 hectares
- Notification date: 1984
- Location map: Magic Map

Hardwick Wood is a 15.5-hectare (38-acre) biological Site of Special Scientific Interest southwest of Hardwick in Cambridgeshire. It is managed by the Wildlife Trust for Bedfordshire, Cambridgeshire and Northamptonshire.

This medieval woodland is managed by coppicing. It is composed mainly of ash and field maple, while the oldest areas contain pedunculate oak with an understorey of hazel and hawthorn. The ground flora includes early-purple orchid and yellow archangel. Bird species recorded in the wood include willow warblers, marsh tits and blackcaps.

The site is accessible by public footpath.
