= Heyshott Down =

Coordinates: 50.944°N 0.725°W

- Site of Special Scientific Interest
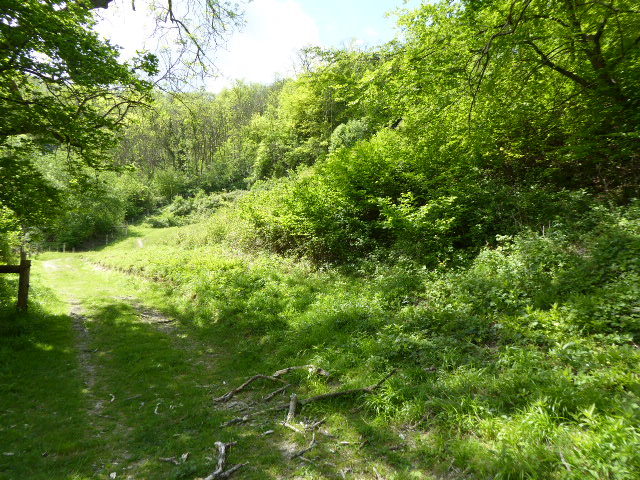
- Location of Heyshott Down.
- Area of search: West Sussex
- Grid reference: SU 897 168
- Interest: Biological
- Area: 42.6 hectares (105 acres)
- Notification date: 1986
- Location map: Magic Map

Heyshott Down is a 42.6-hectare (105-acre) biological Site of Special Scientific Interest south of Midhurst in West Sussex. It is a Nature Conservation Review site, Grade 2.

This site on the South Downs is unimproved chalk grassland, which is a nationally rare habitat. The grassland is plant-rich and it is nationally important for mosses and liverworts, such as Antitrichia curtipendula, Hylocomium brevirostre and Rhytidiadelphus loreus. The site is also nationally important for spiders and harvestmen and it is one of only two sites in Britain where the spider Tapinocyboides pygmaea has been recorded.

There is access by footpaths from Cocking and Heyshott.
