= Ambersham Common =

Protected area in West Sussex, England

Coordinates: 50.967°N 0.707°W

- Site of Special Scientific Interest
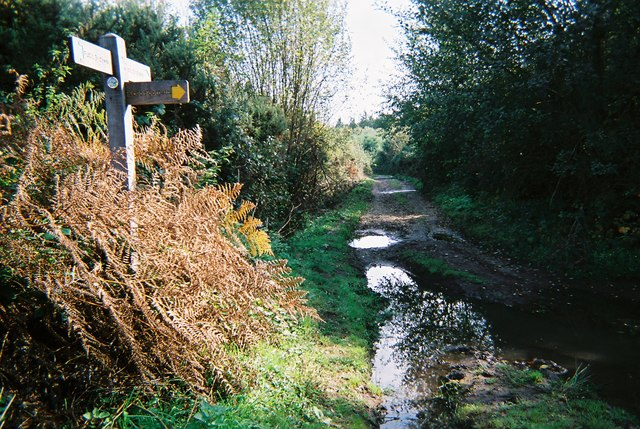
- Location of Ambersham Common.
- Area of search: West Sussex
- Grid reference: SU 909 194
- Interest: Biological
- Area: 141.6 hectares (350 acres)
- Notification date: 1986
- Location map: Magic Map

Ambersham Common is a 141.6-hectare (350-acre) biological Site of Special Scientific Interest south-east of Midhurst in West Sussex. It is a Nature Conservation Review site, Grade 2.

This site is mainly heathland with a wide range of invertebrates, including three nationally rare species. There are also areas of bog and acid carr. It has a diverse variety of bird species, including some which are rare, such as nightjars, woodlarks and Dartford warblers.

Roads and footpaths cross the common.
