= Durobrivae (Water Newton) =

Roman fortified garrison town in England

Coordinates: 52.55899°N 0.34821°W

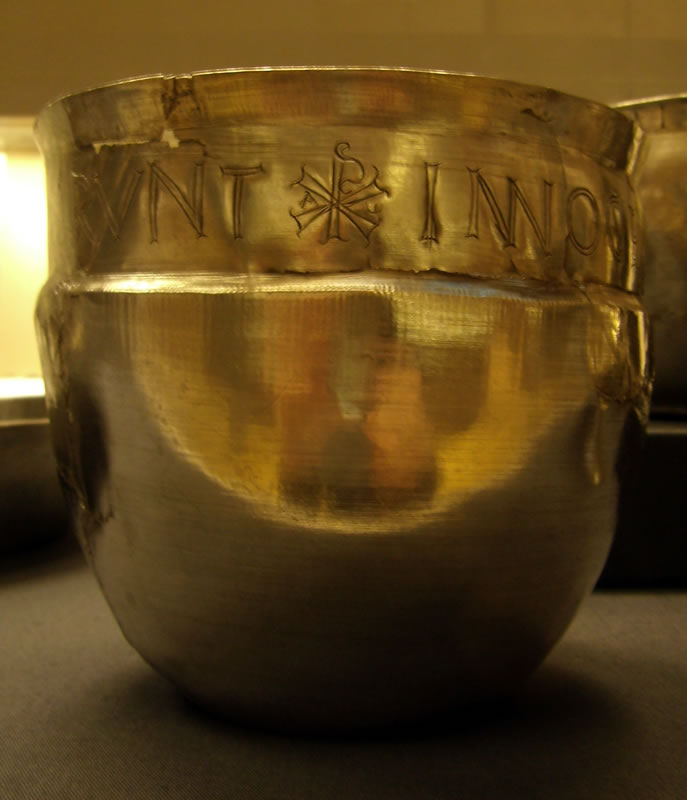
Silver cup from the Water Newton Treasure.

Durobrivae was a Roman fortified garrison town located at Water Newton in the English county of Cambridgeshire, where Ermine Street crossed the River Nene. More generally, it was in the territory of the Corieltauvi in a region of villas and commercial potteries. The name is a Latinisation of Celtic (or more accurately Brythonic) *Durobrīwās, meaning essentially "fort (by the) bridges".

During the Iron Age Britain was divided into distinct tribal areas. The area lay between the Catuvellauni to the south and the Corieltauvi to the north, with the Iceni to the east. The origin of Durobrivae is said to have been as a vicus attached to a "pre-Flavian" fort, established about half a kilometre to the east of modern Water Newton, between the Claudian invasion of 43 AD, and the beginning of the reign of Vespasian in 69 AD. Its first historical mention is in the Antonine Itinerary of the late 2nd century. Archaeology of the Roman period shows that Durobrivae was then the production centre for a fine tableware known as Nene Valley Colour Coated Ware, from the 2nd century to the 4th. In Anglo-Saxon times, local settlement came to centre on Medeshamstede, now known as Peterborough.

== See also ==
- Water Newton Treasure
