= Castor Hanglands National Nature Reserve =

Nature reserve in Cambridgeshire, England

Coordinates: 52.601°N 0.352°W

Castor Hanglands
- Site of Special Scientific Interest
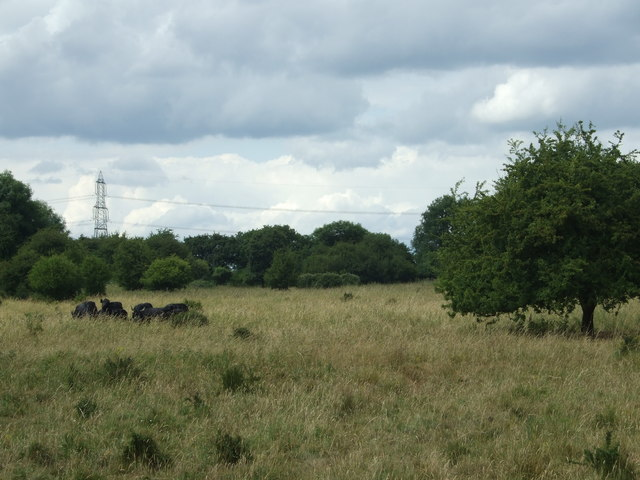
- Location of Castor Hanglands.
- Area of search: Cambridgeshire
- Grid reference: TF 117 016
- Interest: Biological
- Area: 89.8 hectares
- Notification date: 1986
- Location map: Magic Map

Castor Hanglands is an 89.8-hectare (222-acre) biological Site of Special Scientific Interest west of Peterborough in Cambridgeshire. The site is also a National Nature Reserve, and it is a Nature Conservation Review site, Grade I for its woodlands and Grade 2 for its grassland. It is common land managed by Natural England.

The location features ancient ash and maple woodland, unimproved grassland and scrub, and is further described by Natural England as valuable for invertebrates, including some nationally uncommon species. Among the rare plants found here are crested cow-wheat, lesser water-plantain, man orchid and narrow-leaved water dropwort. Woodland butterflies present include silver-washed fritillary, purple hairstreak and white admiral. There are also ponds and ditches which have a variety of aquatic fauna including the Great Crested Newt.

There is access by going south along Heath Road from Helpston, going straight on at the crossroads and then along a track westward to the reserve.

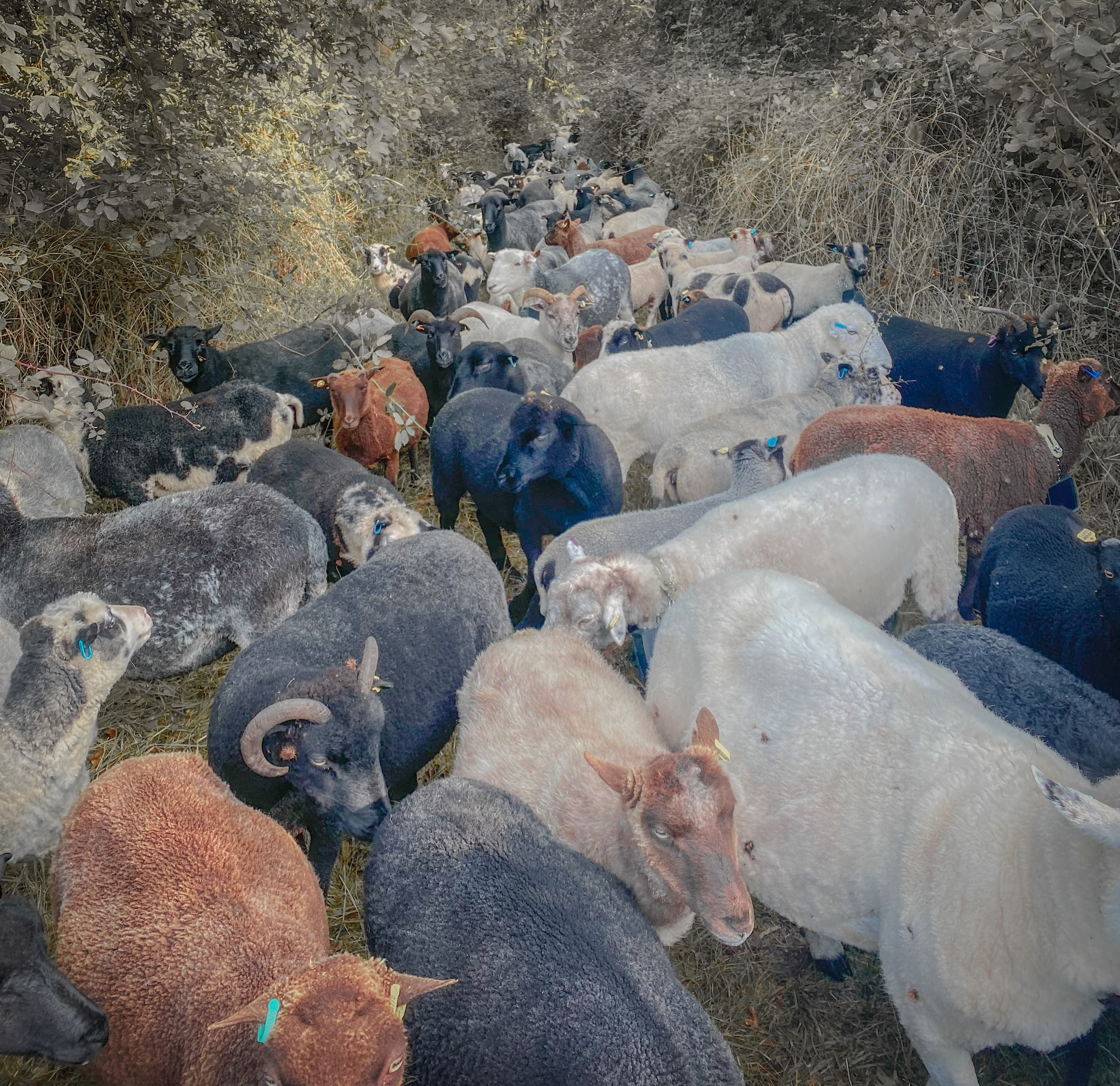
Sheep at Castor Hanglands National Nature Reserve. Their grazing allows rare plants to flourish.
