= List of ancient woods in England =

This list of ancient woods in England contains areas of ancient woodland in England larger than 10 hectares (25 acres). The list is arranged alphabetically by ceremonial county.

Natural England lists 53,636 ancient woodlands in its database as of 2024, comprising 39,223 ancient and semi-natural woodlands (ASNW), 14,339 ancient replanted woodlands (PAWS) and 64 ancient wood pastures (AWP). Most of these are small, with 45,445 of the woods being below 10 ha in size. The breakdown by size (in logarithmic steps) for larger woods is:

Size (ha)	ASNW	PAWS	AWP
10–21.5	3,206	1,648	2
21.5–46.4	1,279	937	0
46.4–100	406	419	0
100–215	86	140	0
215–464	19	44	0
464–1000	0	5	0

== B ==
=== Bedfordshire ===
Bedfordshire ancient woods

The woodlands of Bedfordshire cover 6.2% of the county. Some two thirds of this (4,990 ha or 12,300 acres) is broad-leaved woodland, principally oak and ash. A Woodland Trust estimate of all ancient woodland in Bedfordshire (dating back to at least the year 1600), including woods of 0.1 ha (0.25 acres) and upward suggests an area of 1,468 ha (3,630 acres). This list of Bedfordshire's ancient woodland shows only those woods of over 10 ha (25 acres), all of which have SSSI status, and cover a total of 628 ha (1,550 acres). Of the eight woods shown, five fall roughly on the line of heavily wooded sandstone that runs diagonally across the county south of Bedford.

The principal ancient woods in Bedfordshire
No.	Name	Public access	Location	Area		References
No.	Name	Public access	Location	Ha	Acres	References
1	Hanger Wood	✗	52.1339°N 0.5477°W; SP 995494	24	59	SSSI
2	King's and Baker's Woods	✓	51.9563°N 0.6582°W; SP 923295	212	524	SSSI NNR BNCPWT
3	Kingswood, Houghton Conquest	✓	52.0503°N 0.4775°W; TL 045402	26	64	SSSI Local Gov
4	Maulden Wood	✓	52.0371°N 0.2957°W; TL 170390	149	368	SSSI FC
5	Odell Great Wood	✓	52.2209°N 0.599°W; SP 958590	86	212	SSSI Local Gov
6	Potton Wood	✓	52.1359°N 0.1721°W; TL 252502	85	210	SSSI FC
7	Southill Lake And Woods	✗	52.0718°N 0.3367°W; TL 141428	25	62	SSSI
8	Swineshead Wood	✓	52.2891°N 0.4459°W; TL 061668	21	52	SSSI WT

=== Berkshire ===
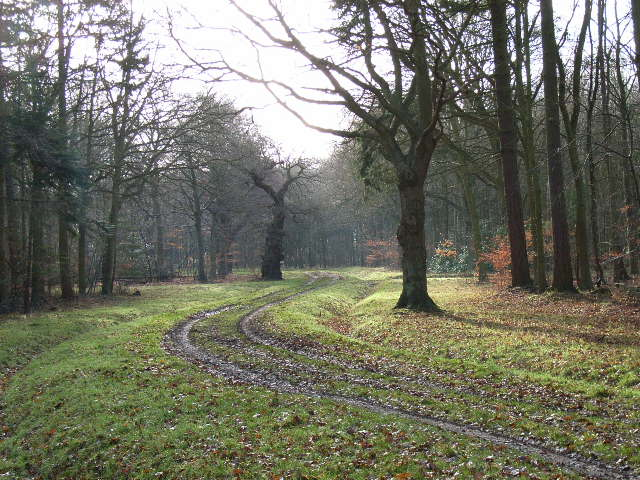
Track through Windsor Forest

Berkshire ancient woods

Berkshire has woodland covering 18,304 ha (45,230 acres), which is 14.5% of its land area. The woodlands listed below are all ancient woods of 10 ha (25 acres) or more, and these cover some 2,403 ha (5,940 acres). A major proportion of the area is the area of woodland along the Surrey and Buckinghamshire borders. This is Windsor Great Park and Forest, and as well as the woodland area listed here, it has vast tracts of heath and parkland. Also in the east of the county are woodlands on the southern end of the Chiltern Hills. The great majority of the woods listed are in West Berkshire and follow the line of the chalk hills across the county.

The principal ancient woods in Berkshire
No.	Name	Public access	Location	Area		References
No.	Name	Public access	Location	Ha	Acres	References
1	Ashridge Wood		51.5023°N 1.281°W; SU500784	16	40	SSSI
2	Bisham Woods	✓	51.5574°N 0.7666°W; SU856850	84	208	SSSI WT
3	Bowdown and Chamberhouse Woods	✓	51.3854°N 1.2699°W; SU509654	67	166	SSSI BBOWT
4	Catmore and Winterly Copses		51.3909°N 1.4624°W; SU375659	25	62	SSSI
5	Combe Wood And Linkenholt Hanging		51.3164°N 1.4891°W; SU357576	108	267	SSSI
6	Coombe Wood, Frilsham		51.4579°N 1.217°W; SU545735	20	49	SSSI
7	Enborne Copse		51.3923°N 1.3791°W; SU433661	12	30	SSSI
8	Great Thrift Wood		51.496°N 0.7467°W; SU871782	14	35	SSSI
9	Irish Hill Copse		51.4006°N 1.4192°W; SU405670	16	40	SSSI
10	Kennet Valley Alderwoods		51.4051°N 1.4263°W; SU400675	55	136	SSSI
11	King's Copse		51.4315°N 1.1714°W; SU577706	14	35	SSSI
12	Redhill Wood		51.3789°N 1.3936°W; SU423646	30	74	SSSI
13	Snelsmore Common	✓	51.4361°N 1.3396°W; SU460710	103	255	SSSI Local Gov
14	Windsor Forest And Great Park	✓	51.4482°N 0.6487°W; SU940730	1777	4391	SSSI Crown Estate

=== Bristol ===
Bristol ancient woods

There is only one sizeable area of ancient woodland within Bristol. The Avon Gorge SSSI is partly within the city boundary, but the woodland is mainly in Somerset, so is covered under that county.

=== Buckinghamshire ===
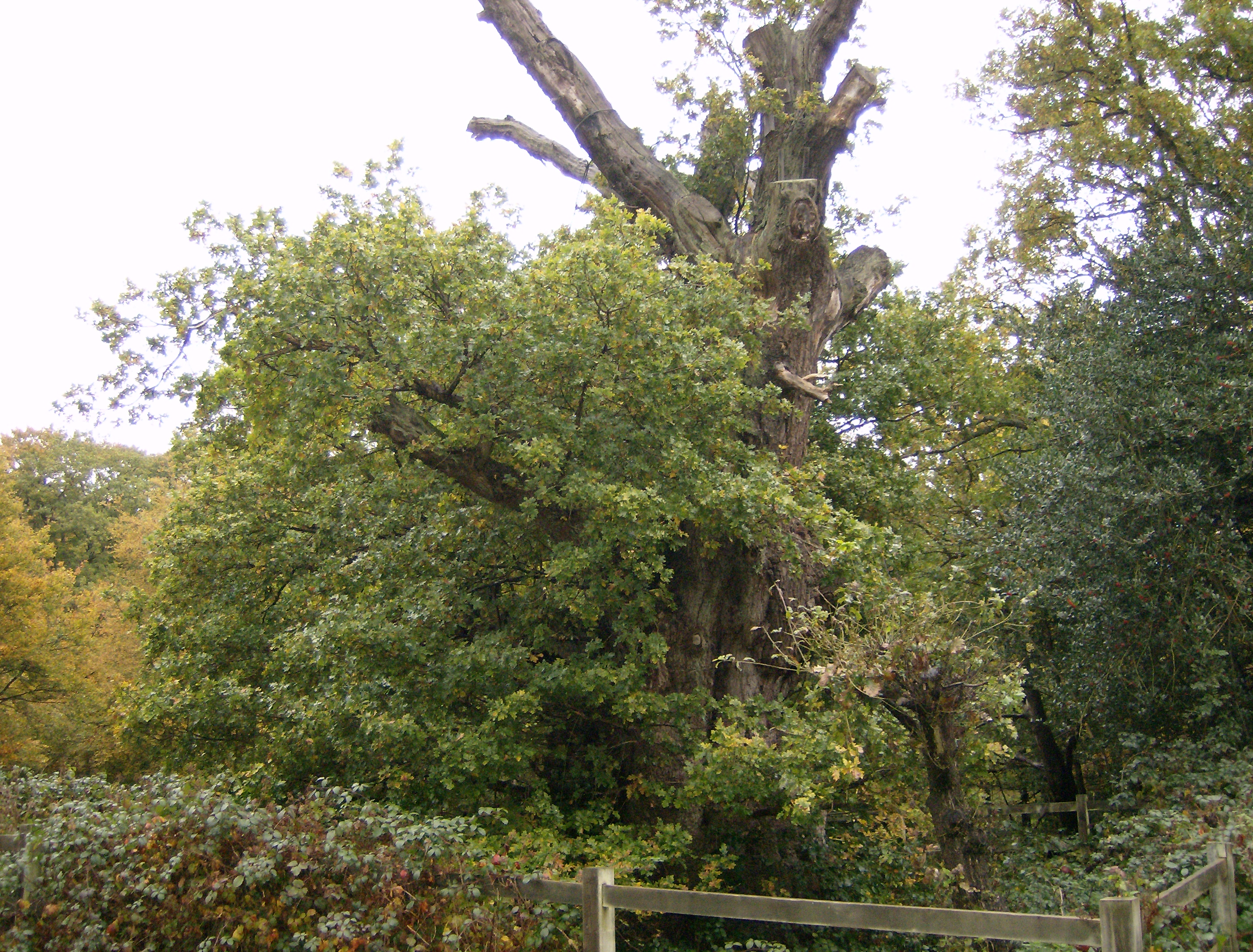
Druids Oak, the oldest tree in Burnham Beeches

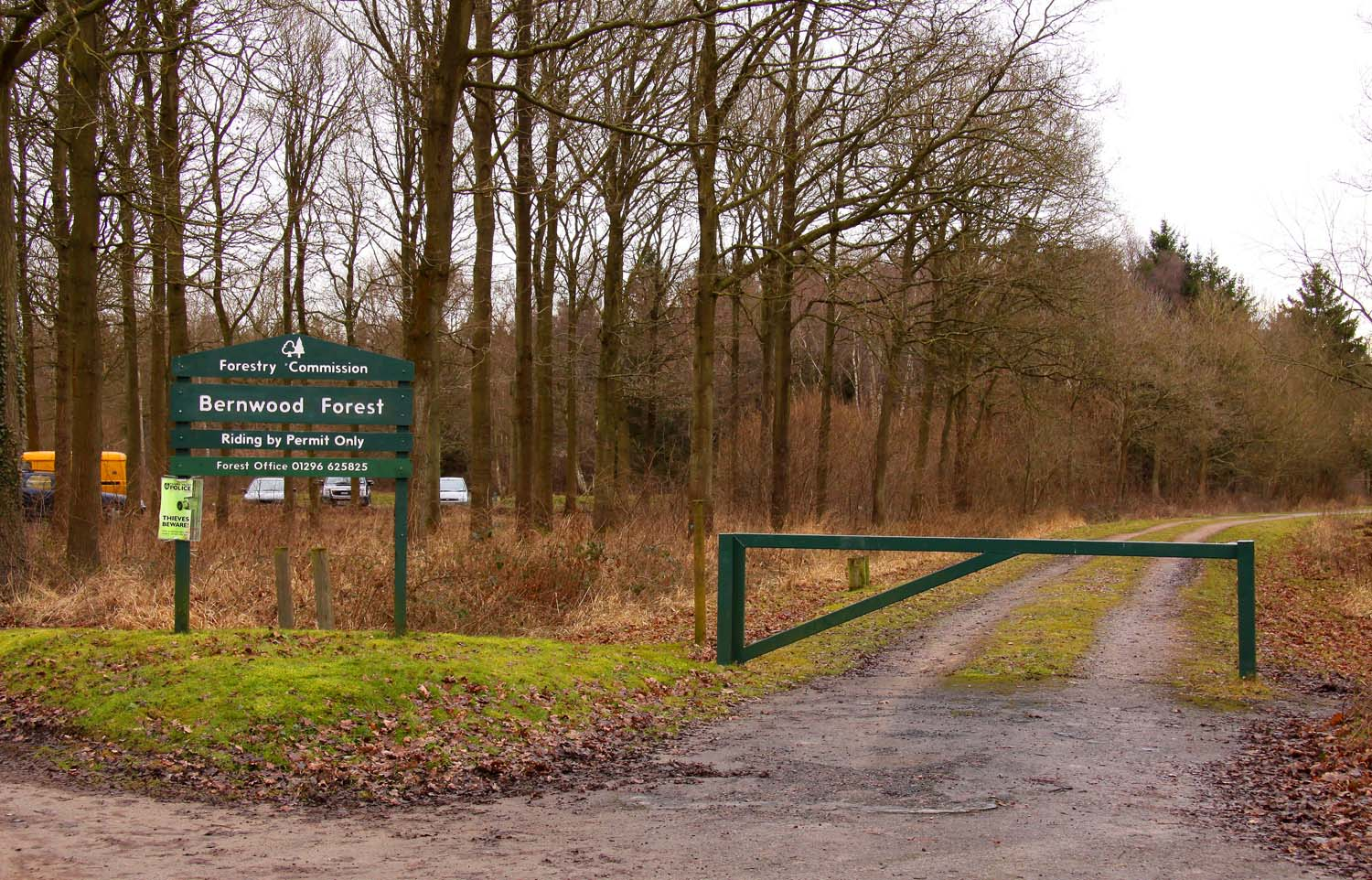
Entrance to Bernwood Forest

9.4% of the land area of Buckinghamshire is woodland.

- Bernwood Forest
- Burnham Beeches
- Hollington Wood
- Jones Hill Wood

== C ==
=== Cambridgeshire ===
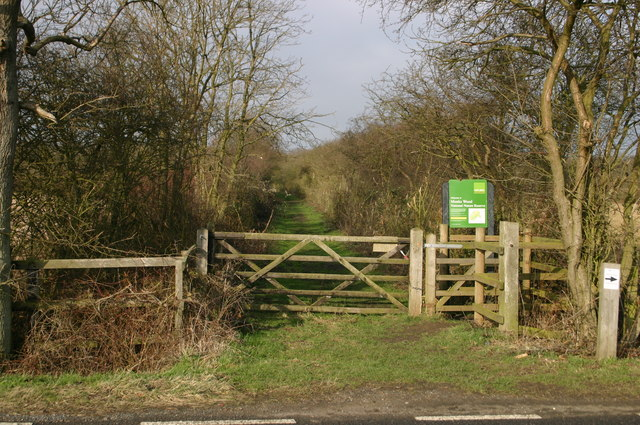
Entrance to Monks Wood, Cambridgeshire

The ancient woods listed here are those over 10 ha (25 acres). With one exception, these are all SSSIs. The woods are distributed very unevenly. Large areas of the fenland in the north-eastern side of the county have none. There are significant numbers in the south, toward Suffolk. More of the woods are found in the western half of the county, with three near Peterborough.

Cambridgeshire ancient woods

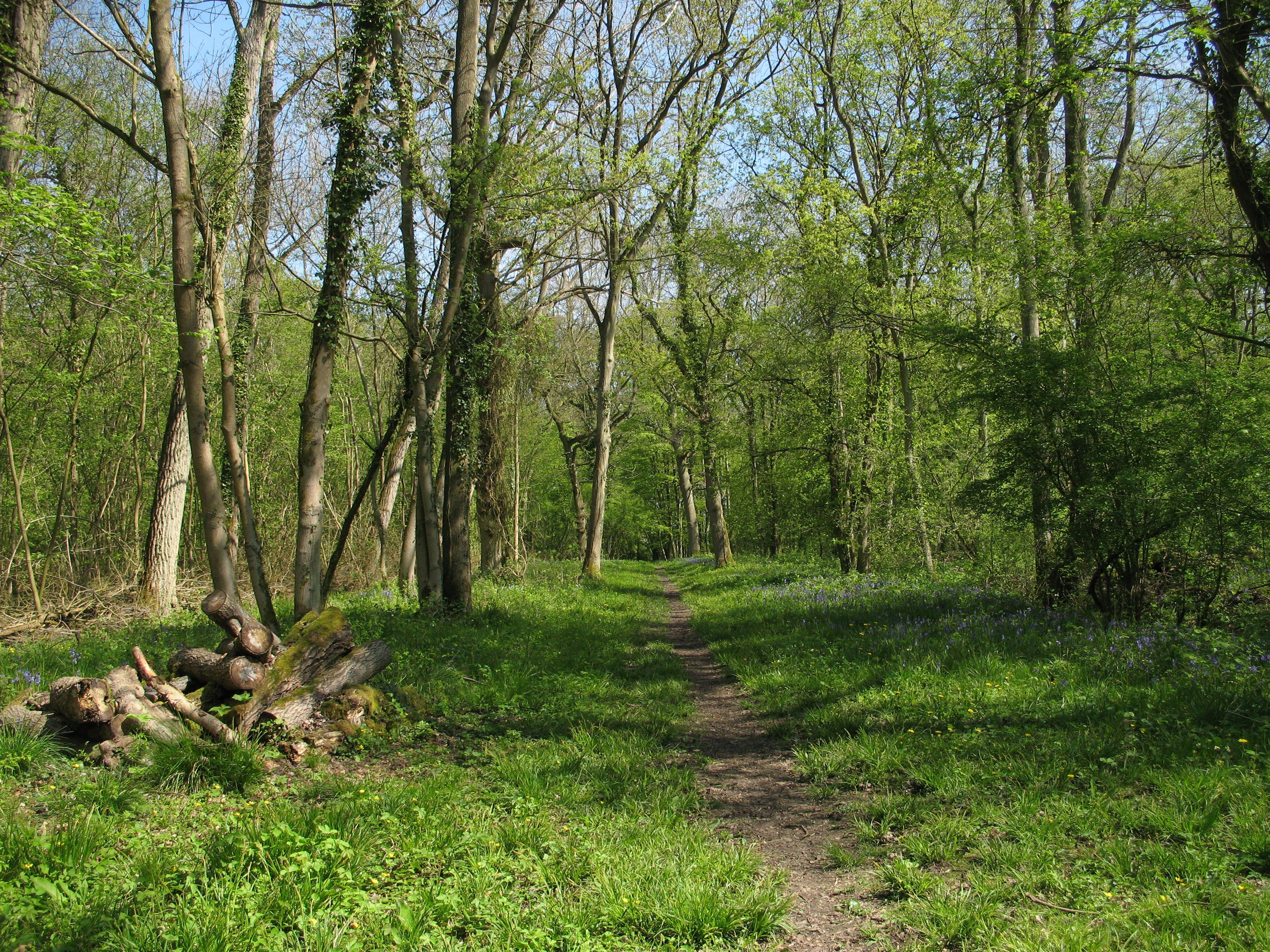
Path through Buff Wood, Cambridgeshire

The principal ancient woods in Cambridgeshire
No.	Name	Public access	Location & map links	Area		References
No.	Name	Public access	Location & map links	Ha	Acres	References
1	Aversley Wood	✓	52.4236°N 0.2911°W; TL163820	61	151	SSSI WT
2	Balsham Wood		52.1219°N 0.3196°E; TL589496	35	85	SSSI
3	Bedford Purlieus NNR	✓	52.5833°N 0.4635°W; TL042995	208	514	SSSI NNR FC
4	Brampton Wood	✓	52.3172°N 0.2703°W; TL180702	132	326	SSSI BCNPWT
5	Buff Wood	✓	52.1361°N 0.1268°W; TL283503	16	39	SSSI BCNPWT
6	Carlton Wood		52.15051°N 0.4161°E; TL654530	10	25	SSSI
7	Gamlingay Wood	✓	52.1658°N 0.1855°W; TL242535	46	114	SSSI BCNPWT
8	Hardwick Wood	✓	52.1991°N 0.0203°W; TL354575	17	42	SSSI BCNPWT
9	Hayley Wood	✓	52.1593°N 0.1141°W; TL291529	52	129	SSSI BCNPWT
10	Kingston Wood and Outliers		52.1684°N 0.064°W; TL325540	49	121	SSSI
11	Langley Wood		52.0567°N 0.3424°E; TL607424	31	77	SSSI
12	Little Paxton Wood		52.2572°N 0.2872°W; TL170635	45	111	SSSI
13	Madingley Wood		52.2168°N 0.0493°E; TL401596	15	38	SSSI
14	Monks Wood NNR		52.4049°N 0.2375°W; TL200800	170	420	SSSI NNR
15	Out and Plunder Woods		52.1674°N 0.4258°E; TL660549	28	69	SSSI
16	Over and Lawn Woods		52.1097°N 0.3876°E; TL636484	45	111	SSSI
17	Perry Woods		52.2849°N 0.3375°W; TL135665	67	165	SSSI
18	Ten Wood		52.1754°N 0.4321°E; TL664558	17	42	SSSI
19	Thorpe Wood	✓	52.5729°N 0.2912°W; TL159986	12	28	SSSI BCNPWT
20	Warboys and Wistow Woods		52.4196°N 0.0883°W; TL301819	42	103	SSSI
21	Waresley Wood		52.177°N 0.1558°W; T 262548	62	153	SSSI
22	Weaveley and Sand Woods		52.1724°N 0.2086°W; TL226542	76	188	SSSI
23	West, Abbot's and Lound Woods		52.5983°N 0.4364°W; TF060012	51	126	SSSI

=== Cheshire ===
Cheshire ancient woods

Cheshire has some 4% of its area under woodland – around half the national average. Since 1994 the Mersey Community Forest has been promoting new woodland planting within the Merseyside and Cheshire region to alleviate this deficit, and also better manage the existing woodland to secure its future. Cheshire has less ancient woodland, and in smaller units than most counties. Many of the ancient woodlands survive in steep valleys or cloughs, of small extent. Taylor's Rough, Wellmeadow Wood, Warburton's Wood And Well Wood are examples of clough woodland too small for inclusion in this list. Most of the ancient woodland in the county is in units smaller than 10 ha (25 acres) and 65% of the area is in woods smaller than 5 ha (12 acres). The list below is of ancient woodland larger than 10 ha (25 acres).

Some of the principal ancient woods in Cheshire
No.	Woodland	Public access	Grid ref. & map link	Area (ha)	Area (acre)	Citation website
1	Peckforton Woods	Yes	SJ 523577	54	130	SSSI
2	Roe Park Woods	Yes	SJ 860585	34.6	85	SSSI Wildlife Trust
3	Wettenhall and Darnhall Woods		SJ 640624	52.6	130	SSSI
4	Wimboldsley Wood		SJ 675642	19	47	SSSI

=== City of London ===
No ancient woodland remains in the City of London although the City of London Corporation are directly responsible for large areas of woodland elsewhere, notably Epping Forest (Essex), Highgate Wood (Greater London) and Burnham Beeches (Bucks)

=== Cornwall ===
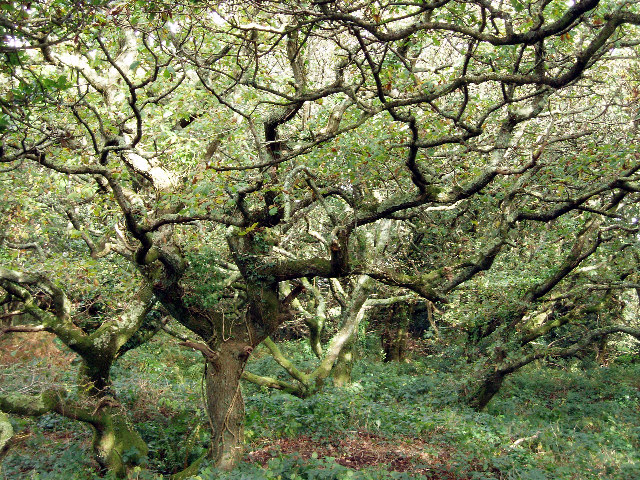
Old oak wood near Goodern Manor Farm, Cornwall

The county of Cornwall has woodland representing 7.5% of the land area.

Steeple Woods – 16.2 hectares (40 acres)

Devichoys Wood – 16 hectares (40 acres)

=== Cumbria ===
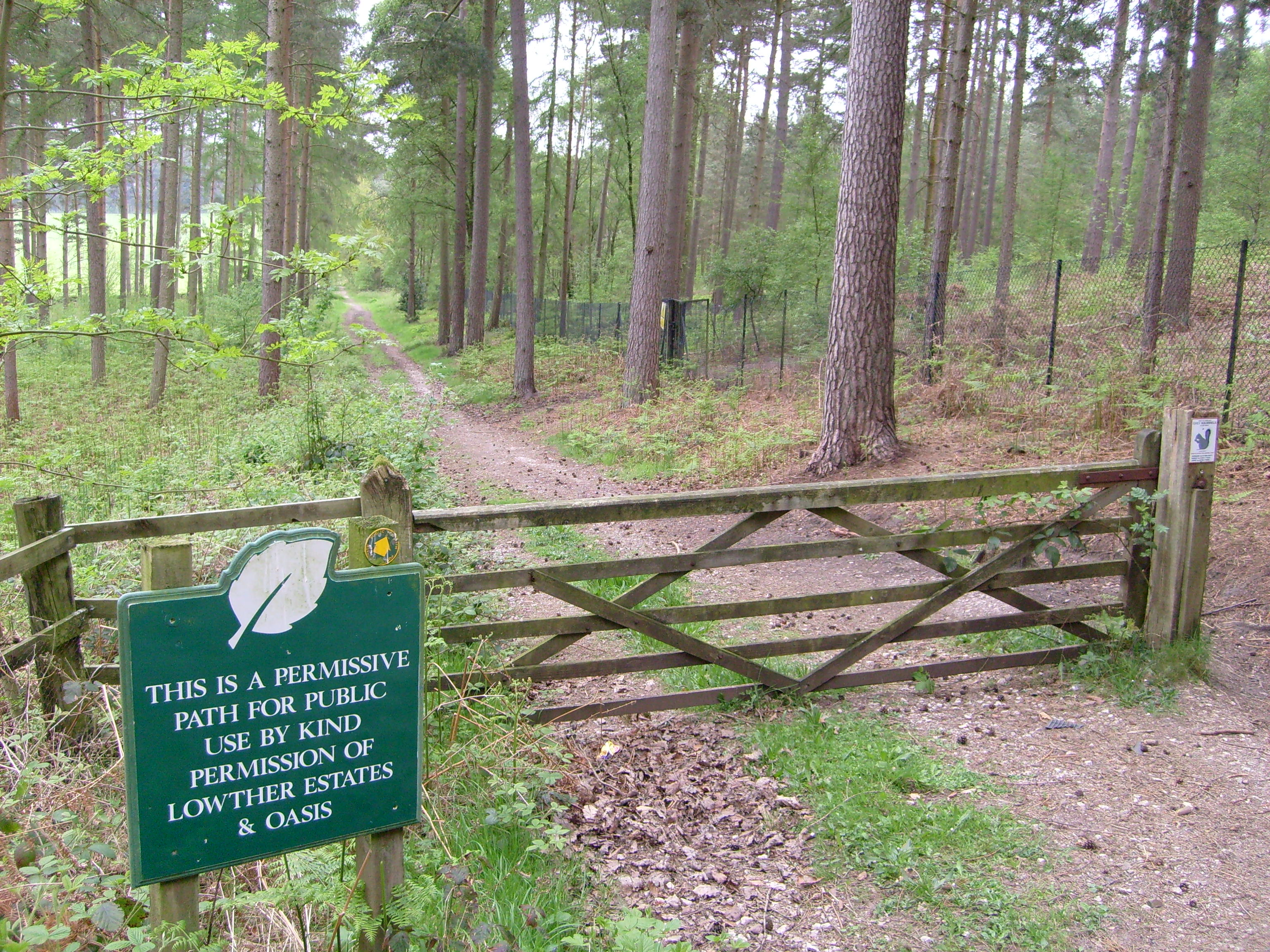
Footpath in Whinfell Forest, Cumbria

9.5% of the land area of Cumbria is woodland.

- Whinfell Forest

== D ==
=== Derbyshire ===
- Shining Cliff Wood53.06691°N 1.50450°W

=== Devon ===
- Wistman's Wood

=== Dorset ===
- Duncliffe Wood
- Holt Heath
- Powerstock Common
- Thorncombe Wood

=== Durham ===
- Brignall Banks SSSI
- Castle Eden Dene SSSI and NNR
- Deepdale Wood
- Derwent Gorge SSSI and NNR
- Great High Wood
- Hawthorn Dene SSSI
- Hesleden Dene
- Pontburn Woods

== E ==
=== East Riding of Yorkshire ===
- Burton Bushes in Beverley Westwood

=== East Sussex ===
16.7% of the land area of East Sussex is woodland.

=== Essex ===
- Epping Forest
- Hadleigh Woods
- Hockley Woods SSSI
- Hatfield Forest SSSI
- Nevendon Bushes
- Norsey Wood

== G ==
=== Gloucestershire ===
11.2% of the land area of Gloucestershire is woodland.

- Forest of Dean
- Lower Woods

=== Greater London ===
- Bluebell Wood
- Cherry Tree Wood
- Coldfall Wood
- Highgate Wood
- Lesnes Abbey Woods
- Oxleas Wood SSSI
- Queen's Wood
- Ruislip Woods NNR
- Great North Wood
- Scratchwood

=== Greater Manchester ===
- Borsdane Wood

== H ==
=== Hampshire ===
17.7% of the land area of Hampshire is woodland.

- New Forest

=== Herefordshire ===
- Queenswood

=== Hertfordshire ===
9.5% of Hertfordshire's land area is woodland.

- Ashridge Estate
- Benington High Wood
- Birchanger Wood, near Bishop's Stortford
- Broxbourne Woods NNR, near Broxbourne
- Bush Wood
- Knebworth Woods
- Northaw Great Wood
- Sherrardspark Wood, near Welwyn Garden City
- Whippendell Wood, 65 ha (160 acres), Watford

== I ==
=== Isle of Wight ===
In 2012 the Isle of Wight Biodiversity Partnership commissioned a revised Ancient Woodland Inventory for the island, and this was completed in 2014. This has a list of all identified ancient woodland sites on the Isle of Wight.

- Brading Wood, part of the Brading Marshes RSPB reserve
- Parkhurst Forest

== K ==
=== Kent ===
10.6% of Kent's land area is wooded, and it has more ancient woodland than any other county.

- Barrows Wood, Trundle Wood and High Wood around Wormshill
- Chattenden Woods and Lodge Hill SSSI
- Cobham Woods
- Combwell Wood
- Darenth Wood SSSI
- East Blean Woods NNR
- Ham Street Woods NNR
- Parsonage Wood SSSI
- Robins Wood SSSI
- South Blean
- West Blean NNR
- Westerham Wood SSSI
- Yockletts Bank SSSI

== L ==
=== Lancashire ===
- Boilton, Nab, Red Scar and Tun Brook Woods, Preston

=== Leicestershire ===
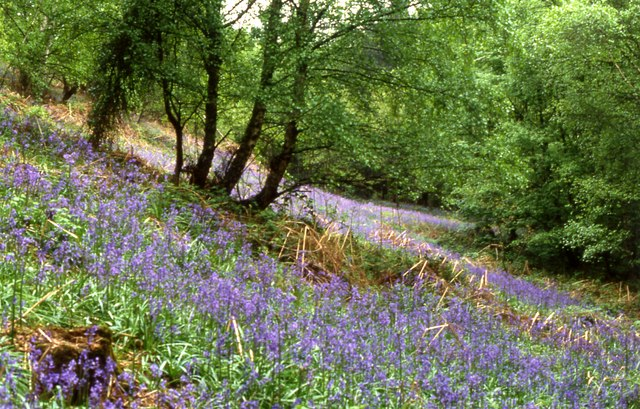
Bluebells in the Outwoods, Charnwood Forest, Leicestershire

It is estimated that 2% of Leicestershire's land area is ancient woodland, of which half has been replaced by new plantings in recent times. There are over 100 woods in Leicestershire believed to be ancient. The sites listed below are those over 10 ha (25 acres) in size, and with one exception, all have SSSI status. With one group of woods near Hinckley, in the south-west, the remainder fall into three broad areas. In East Leicestershire, close to the border with Rutland, are the woods near Leighfield Forest, an extensive royal forest which straddled the two counties. North west of Leicester are the woods of Charnwood Forest. Further west are the woods of the coal measures toward the border with Derbyshire.

Leicestershire ancient woods

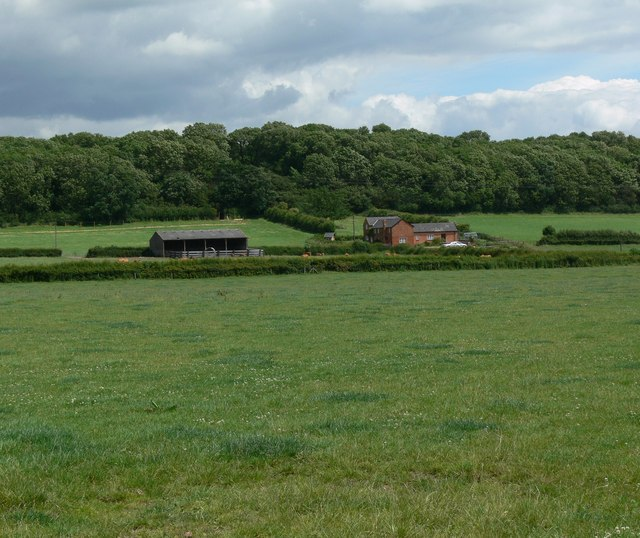
Launde Big Wood, Leicestershire, with Launde Wood Farm in the foreground

Some of the principal ancient woods in Leicestershire
No.	Woodland	Public access	Location	Area (ha)	Area (acre)	Designation
1	Allexton Wood	No	^{52.5862°N 0.7896°W} SP 821994	26	64	SSSI
2	Buddon Wood, Quorn	No	^{52.7253°N 1.1723°W} SK560145	45	111	SSSI
3	Burbage and Sheepy Woods	Yes	^{52.5429°N 1.3335°W} SP 453941	52	128	SSSI Local Gov.
4	Cloud Wood, Breedon	Yes	^{52.7886°N 1.3831°W} SK 417214	35	86	SSSI Wildlife Trust
5	Dimminsdale	Yes	^{52.7925°N 1.4424°W} SK 377 218	16	40	SSSI Wildlife Trust
6	Eye Brook Valley Woods	Yes (part)	^{52.5573°N 0.7713°W} SP 834962	68	168	SSSI Wildlife Trust
7	Grace Dieu Wood		^{52.7489°N 1.354°W} SK437170	52	128	SSSI National Forest
8	Hangingstone and Out Woods	Yes (part)	^{52.7437°N 1.243°W} SK 512165	88	217	SSSI Local Gov.
9	Launde Big Wood and Launde Park Wood	Yes	^{52.6263°N 0.8388°W} SK 787038	80	198	SSSI Wildlife Trust
10	Martinshaw Wood	Yes	^{52.6601°N 1.2474°W} SK510072	103	255	Woodland Trust
11	Owston Woods		^{52.6505°N 0.8337°W} SK 790065	141	348	SSSI
12	Pasture and Asplin Woods, Breedon		^{52.7903°N 1.3697°W} SK 426216	42	104	SSSI
13	Skeffington and Tilton Woods (Leighfield Forest)		^{52.6167°N 0.8685°W} SK 767027	153	378	SSSI
14	Swithland Wood	Yes	^{52.7075°N 1.2037°W} SK 539125	75	185	SSSI

=== Lincolnshire ===
- Bradley and Dixon Woods, Grimsby 53.53°N 0.13°W
- Legbourne Wood, Legbourne, Louth 53.32839966°N 0.05528353°E
- Stapleford Woods, Stapleford, North Kesteven53.099217°N 0.714969°W
- Reddings Woods, Kirkby on Bain, Lincolnshire, East Lindsey 53.146°N 0.155°W

== M ==
=== Merseyside ===
- Dibbinsdale, Wirral Hundred, Merseyside

== N ==
=== Norfolk ===
- Foxley Wood
- Wayland Wood

=== North Yorkshire ===
- Grass Wood, Wharfedale54.0851°N 2.0177°W
- Nidd Gorge, Knaresborough54.014°N 1.487°W

=== Northamptonshire ===
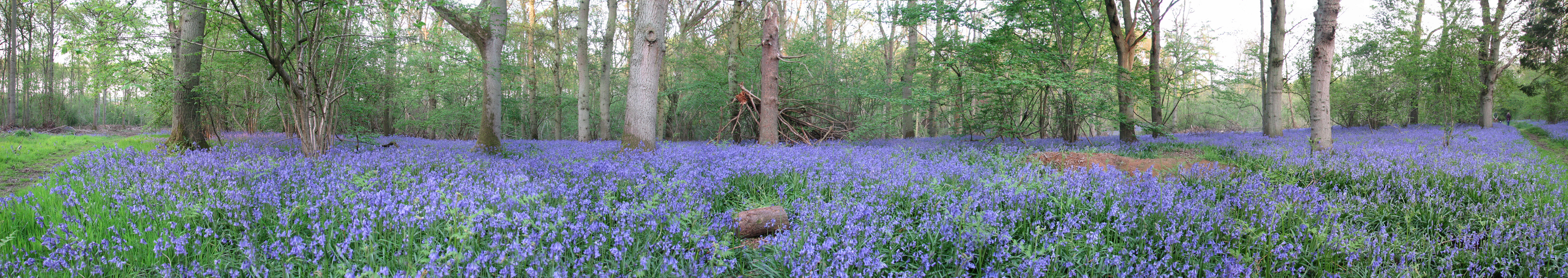
A Panoramic in the north-east of Bucknell Wood, part of Whittlewood Forest

The ancient woods of Northants are concentrated towards the south and west of the county, to that region bordering Bucks, Oxford and Beds. Many are managed by the Forestry Commission, although others are in private hands. They tend to occur on limestone soils in elevated country, and exhibit a diversity of habitats.

- Hazleborough Wood, part of Whittlewood Forest
- Royal Forest of Rockingham
- Salcey Forest
- Whittlewood Forest
- Yardley Chase SSSI

=== Northumberland ===
- Allen Banks and Staward Gorge
- Whittle Dene

=== Nottinghamshire ===
- Sherwood Forest 53.2045°N 1.0728°W

== O ==
=== Oxfordshire ===
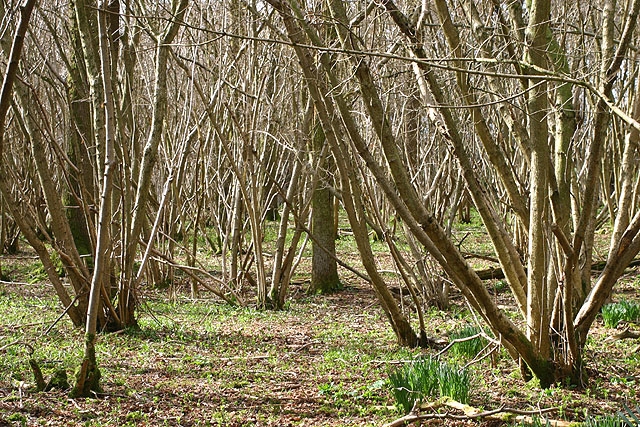
Young coppice at Out Wood, Oxfordshire

The ancient woods of Oxfordshire are concentrated in three distinct areas. In the south are woods of the Chiltern Hills. A second cluster lies to the east of Oxford. The Cotswolds woods on the western side of the county include those in the Royal Forest of Wychwood. Oxfordshire has nearly 18,000 ha (44,000 acres) of woodland in total (6.9% of its area), two-thirds of which are in woods of over 10 ha (25 acres). 1,839 ha (4,540 acres) of woodland is represented in the 17 ancient woods listed below. Some 6,000 ha (15,000 acres) of woodland is split among the 3,390 woods smaller than 10 ha. Many of these smaller woods may be ancient, but are not covered by this list. The list here covers woods of over 10 ha with SSSI status.

Oxfordshire ancient woods

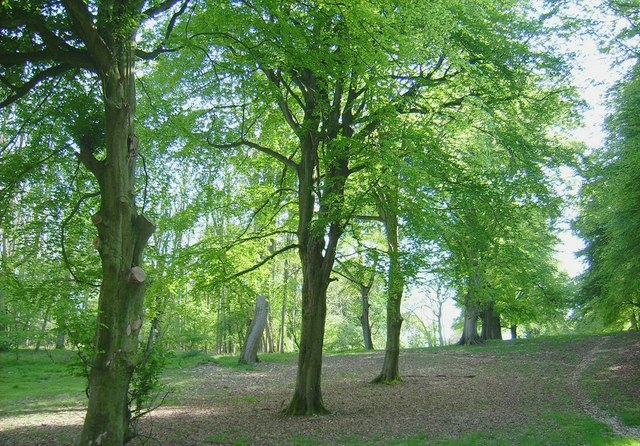
Wychwood Forest, Oxfordshire

Some of the principal ancient woods in Oxfordshire
No.	Woodland	Public access	Location & map link	Area (ha)	Area (acre)	Status
1	Aston Rowant Woods	Yes (part)	51.6794°N 0.9166°W; SU750984	26	64	SSSI
2	Bear, Oveys and Great Bottom Woods		51.5506°N 1.0019°W; SU693840	45	111	SSSI
3	Bould Wood		51.882°N 1.634°W; SP253205	52	128	SSSI
4	Harpsden Wood	Yes	51.5174°N 0.9046°W; SU761804	35	86	SSSI; Woodland Trust
5	Holly Wood LNR		51.7856°N 1.149°W; SP588100	16	40	SSSI
6	Holton Wood		51.7674°N 1.1276°W; SP603080	68	168	SSSI
7	Lambridge Wood		51.5546°N 0.9427°W; SU734845	52	128	SSSI
8	Out Wood		51.8843°N 1.4086°W; SP408208	88	217	SSSI
9	Pishill Woods		51.6052°N 0.969°W; SU715901	80	198	SSSI
10	Sarsgrove Wood		51.9164°N 1.558°W; SP305243	103	255	SSSI
11	Stanton Great Wood		51.7793°N 1.1491°W; SP588093	141	348	SSSI
12	Sturt Copse		51.8322°N 1.4209°W; SP400150	42	104	SSSI
13	Waterperry Wood		51.7764°N 1.1245°W; SP605090	153	378	SSSI
14	Whitecross Green and Oriel Woods		51.825°N 1.1265°W; SP603144	75	185	SSSI; Wildlife Trust
15	Woodeaton Wood		51.7976°N 1.3488°W; SP450112	976	2,412	SSSI
16	Wychwood		51.8398°N 1.5195°W; SP332158	530	1,310	SSSI; Wildlife Trust Wychwood Project
17	Wytham Woods		51.7715°N 1.3318°W; SP462083	61	151	SSSI

== R ==
=== Rutland ===
- Burley Wood
- Prior's Coppice

== S ==
=== Shropshire ===
- Wyre Forest NNR (also in Worcestershire)

=== Somerset ===
Somerset is a rural county of rolling hills such as the Blackdown Hills, Mendip Hills, Quantock Hills and Exmoor National Park, and large flat expanses of land including the Somerset Levels. Many of the woodland areas have been designated as SSSIs with some being managed by the Avon Wildlife Trust or Somerset Wildlife Trust. Woodland covers seven per cent of the land area of the county.

Some of the principal ancient woods in Somerset
Woodland	Public access	Coordinates and map link	Area (ha)	Area (acre)	Designation	Citations
Aller and Beer Woods		51.0707°N 2.8520°W	56.9	141	SSSI	
Asham Wood		51.2124°N 2.4237°W	140.6	347	SSSI	
Cheddar Wood	Permit required	51.2932°N 2.7973°W	86.9	215	SSSI	
Cogley Wood		51.1090°N 2.4256°W	60.7	150	SSSI	
Dunkery and Horner Woods	Yes	51.1619°N 3.5874°W	1,604	3,964	SSSI, NNR	
Edford Woods and Meadows		51.2347°N 2.4812°W	54.3	134	SSSI	
Great Breach and Copley Woods		51.0851°N 2.7152°W	64.8	160	SSSI	
Harridge Wood						
Hawkcombe Woods		51.2017°N 3.5933°W	101	250	Proposed NNR	
Horner Wood	Yes	51.188°N 3.582°W	324	801	NNR	
Leigh Woods	Yes	51.4631°N 2.6392°W	155.4	384	SSSI, NNR	
Limebreach Wood		51.4498°N 2.7698°W				
Longleat Woods		51.1903°N 2.2947°W	249.9	618	SSSI	
Long Dole Wood and Meadows		51.3036°N 2.5608°W	9.8	24	SSSI	
Neroche Forest		50.9375°N 3.0367°W				
North Exmoor	Yes	51.1736°N 3.7179°W	12,005.3	29,666	SSSI	
Postlebury Wood		51.1856°N 2.3734°W	87	215	SSSI	
Prior's Park & Adcombe Wood		50.9471°N 3.1026°W	103.6	256	SSSI	
Sparkford Wood		51.0455°N 2.5534°W	8.4	21	SSSI	
Thurlbear Wood and Quarrylands		50.9837°N 3.0413°W	26.7	66	SSSI	
Towerhouse Wood		51.4441°N 2.7561°W				
Twinhills Woods and Meadows		51.1863°N 2.6338°W	21.2	52	SSSI	
Weston Big Wood	Yes	51.4713°N 2.7860°W	37.48	93	SSSI	

=== South Yorkshire ===
- Bagger Wood53.519°N 1.543°W
- Beeley Wood53°25′47″N 1°31′32″W
- Watchley Crags53.55886°N 1.27681°W

=== Staffordshire ===
- Cannock Chase SSSI

=== Suffolk ===
- Arger Fen and Spouses Grove
- Assington Thicks
- Bradfield Woods NNR
- Bull's Wood
- Calves Wood
- Foxburrow Wood (Suffolk)
- Palant's Grove
- Snakes Wood
- Staverton Park and the Thicks
- Wolves Wood

=== Surrey ===
22.4% of the land area of Surrey is woodland; this makes it the most wooded county in England.

== T ==
=== Tyne and Wear ===
- Thornley Wood SSSI
- Derwent Walk Country Park woods
- Stanley Burn Wood
- Snipes Dene Wood, part of Gibside SSSI
- Lands Wood, Winlaton Mill

== W ==
=== Warwickshire ===
- Bush Wood
- Rough Hill Wood
- Ryton Wood SSSI

=== West Midlands ===
- Sutton Park SSSI
- Rough Wood

=== West Sussex ===
18.9% of West Sussex's land area is woodland.

- Titnore Wood
- Kingley Vale NNR
- Worth Forest

=== West Yorkshire ===
- Batty's Wood53.820061°N 1.560144°W

=== Wiltshire ===
- Savernake forest SSSI
- Vincients Wood

=== Worcestershire ===
- Grafton Wood
- Laight Rough
- Pepper Wood
- Shrawley Wood
- Wyre Forest (also in Shropshire)

== See also ==
- Ancient woodland
- English land law
- Forest of Lyme
