= Wolves Wood =

Woodland in Suffolk, England

Coordinates: 52.056°N 0.995°E

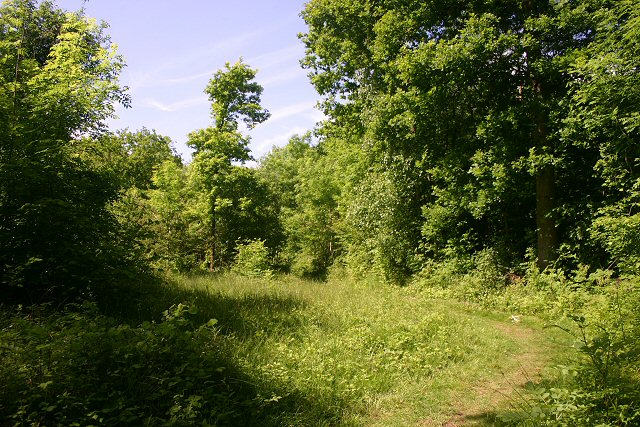

Wolves Wood is a woodland near Hadleigh, Suffolk. It is one of 7 ancient woodland areas within Suffolk. An ancient woodland is defined as a site that has been continuously occupied by woodland from the year 1600 or before.

== Overview ==
Wolves Wood is managed by the Royal Society for the Protection of Birds using coppicing and is located six miles from Ipswich railway station, north east of Hadleigh. It is on the A1071, Ipswich Road. The wood has an area of 38.4 hectares and it is part of the Hintlesham Woods biological Site of Special Scientific Interest, and Nature Conservation Review site, Grade I.

== Flora and fauna ==
Plant species include oak.

It is home to roe deer, twelve species of dragonfly and damselfly while bird species found in the woods include the Garden Warbler, the Great Spotted Woodpecker, the Marsh Tit, the Nightingale and the Sparrowhawk.

== Facilities ==
Wolves Wood has a mile-long circular nature trail, car parking for 15 cars and a single Sheffield stand for cycles (being near a Sustrans cycle route.)

== Suffolk ==
The other six ancient woodlands in Suffolk are as follows:

- Arger Fen and Spouses Grove
- Assington Thicks
- Bradfield Woods
- Bull's Wood
- Snakes Wood
- Staverton Park-Butley
