= Carlton Wood =

Site of Special Scientific Interest in England

Coordinates: 52.15°N 0.416°E

- Site of Special Scientific Interest
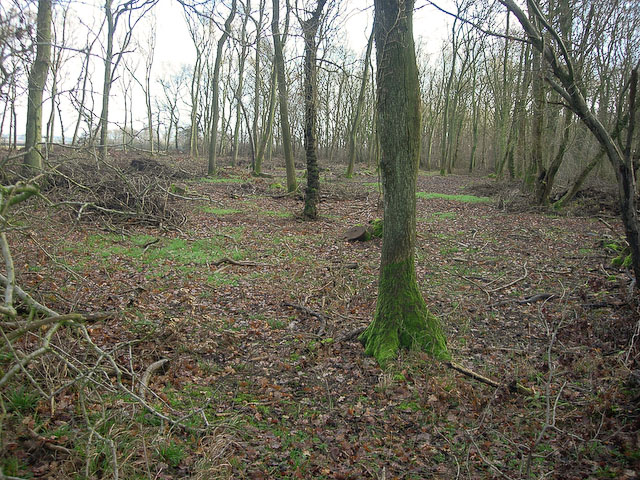
- Location of Carlton Wood.
- Area of search: Cambridgeshire
- Interest: Biological
- Area: 10.4 hectares
- Notification date: 1986
- Location map: Magic Map

Carlton Wood is a 10.4-hectare (26-acre) biological Site of Special Scientific Interest on the eastern boundary of Cambridgeshire, and west of Great Bradley in Suffolk.

According to Natural England, this wood has one of the finest stands of hornbeam in the county. Other trees are ash, field maple, hazel and pedunculate oak. There is a variety of flora typical of ancient woodlands such as oxlips and early-purple orchids.

The wood is private land with no public access.
