= Listed buildings in Shelley, Suffolk =

Civil Parish in Suffolk, England

Shelley is a village and civil parish in the Babergh District of Suffolk, England. It contains 18 listed buildings that are recorded in the National Heritage List for England. Of these one is grade II* and 17 are grade II.

This list is based on the information retrieved online from Historic England.

== Key ==
Grade	Criteria
I	Buildings that are of exceptional interest
II*	Particularly important buildings of more than special interest
II	Buildings that are of special interest

== Listing ==
Name	Grade	Location	Type	Completed (Note: The date given is the date used by Historic England as significant for the initial building or that of an important part in the structure's description.)	Date designated	Grid ref. (Note: The grid reference is based on the British national grid reference system, sometimes known as OSGB36, used by the Ordnance Survey.) Geo-coordinates	Notes	Entry number (Note: The "List Entry Number" is a unique number assigned to each listed building and scheduled monument by Historic England.)	Image	Wikidata
Barn Approximately 10 Metres South of Shelley Dairy	II	Beckett's Lane			30 October 1990	TM0226237909; 52°00′10″N 0°56′43″E		1285566	Upload Photo	Q26574249
Barn Approximately 20 Metres North West of Shelley Dairy	II	Beckett's Lane			30 October 1990	TM0223437958; 52°00′12″N 0°56′42″E		1033414	Upload Photo	Q26284895
Cartlodge Adjacent to South of Barn Listed 2/91 and Approximately 20 Metres South of Shelley Dairy	II	Beckett's Lane			30 October 1990	TM0225737898; 52°00′10″N 0°56′43″E		1033413	Upload Photo	Q26284893
Cartlodge Approximately 30 Metres North of Shelley Dairy	II	Beckett's Lane			30 October 1990	TM0226037966; 52°00′12″N 0°56′43″E		1194769	Upload Photo	Q26489381
Shelley Dairy	II	Beckett's Lane			30 October 1990	TM0226237931; 52°00′11″N 0°56′43″E		1194719	Upload Photo	Q26489333
Teapot Cottage	II	Beckett's Lane			30 October 1990	TM0227237557; 51°59′59″N 0°56′43″E		1194781	Upload Photo	Q26489396
Beckett's Barn Cottage	II	Becketts Lane			30 October 1990	TM0173538173; 52°00′19″N 0°56′16″E		1033411	Upload Photo	Q26284891
Chapel House	II	Church Road			30 October 1990	TM0313038484; 52°00′27″N 0°57′30″E		1033383	Upload Photo	Q26284865
Church Cottage	II	Church Road			30 October 1990	TM0309938488; 52°00′28″N 0°57′28″E		1351980	Upload Photo	Q26635038
Church of All Saints	II*	Church Road	church building		22 February 1955	TM0308238457; 52°00′27″N 0°57′27″E		1351959	Church of All Saints More images	Q17534708
Shelley House	II	Church Road			22 February 1955	TM0306038752; 52°00′36″N 0°57′26″E		1033384	Upload Photo	Q26284867
Shelley Lodge	II	Church Road			30 October 1990	TM0313438442; 52°00′26″N 0°57′30″E		1033382	Upload Photo	Q26284864
Barn Approximately 40 Metres South West of Shelley Hall	II	Hall Road			30 October 1990	TM0277138180; 52°00′18″N 0°57′10″E		1351982	Upload Photo	Q26635040
Shelley Hall	II	Hall Road			22 February 1955	TM0281438206; 52°00′19″N 0°57′12″E		1351981	Upload Photo	Q26635039
Shelley Priory	II	Priory Lane	priory		30 October 1990	TM0092438348; 52°00′26″N 0°55′34″E		1033386	Shelley Priory More images	Q26284869
Sparrows Farmhouse	II	Priory Lane			30 October 1990	TM0081238261; 52°00′23″N 0°55′28″E		1033387	Upload Photo	Q26284870
Outbuiding, Probably A Former Bakehouse/brewhouse, Approximately 4 Metres South East of Shelley Dairy	II	Probably A Former Bakehouse/brewhouse, Approximately 4 Metres South East Of Shelley Dairy, Beckett's Lane			30 October 1990	TM0227537915; 52°00′10″N 0°56′44″E		1033412	Upload Photo	Q26284892
Wall and Gateway Attached to East of Northern Range, Shelley Hall	II	Shelley Hall, Hall Road			30 October 1990	TM0283338204; 52°00′19″N 0°57′13″E		1033385	Upload Photo	Q26284868

== See also ==
- Grade I listed buildings in Suffolk
- Grade II* listed buildings in Suffolk

== Sources ==
- Bettely, James; Pevsner, Nikolaus (2015) [1961], Suffolk: West, The Buildings of England, New Haven and London: Yale University Press, ISBN 978-0-300-19655-9
