= Thorpe Morieux Woods =

Woodland in Suffolk, England

Coordinates: 52.16°N 0.84°E

- Site of Special Scientific Interest
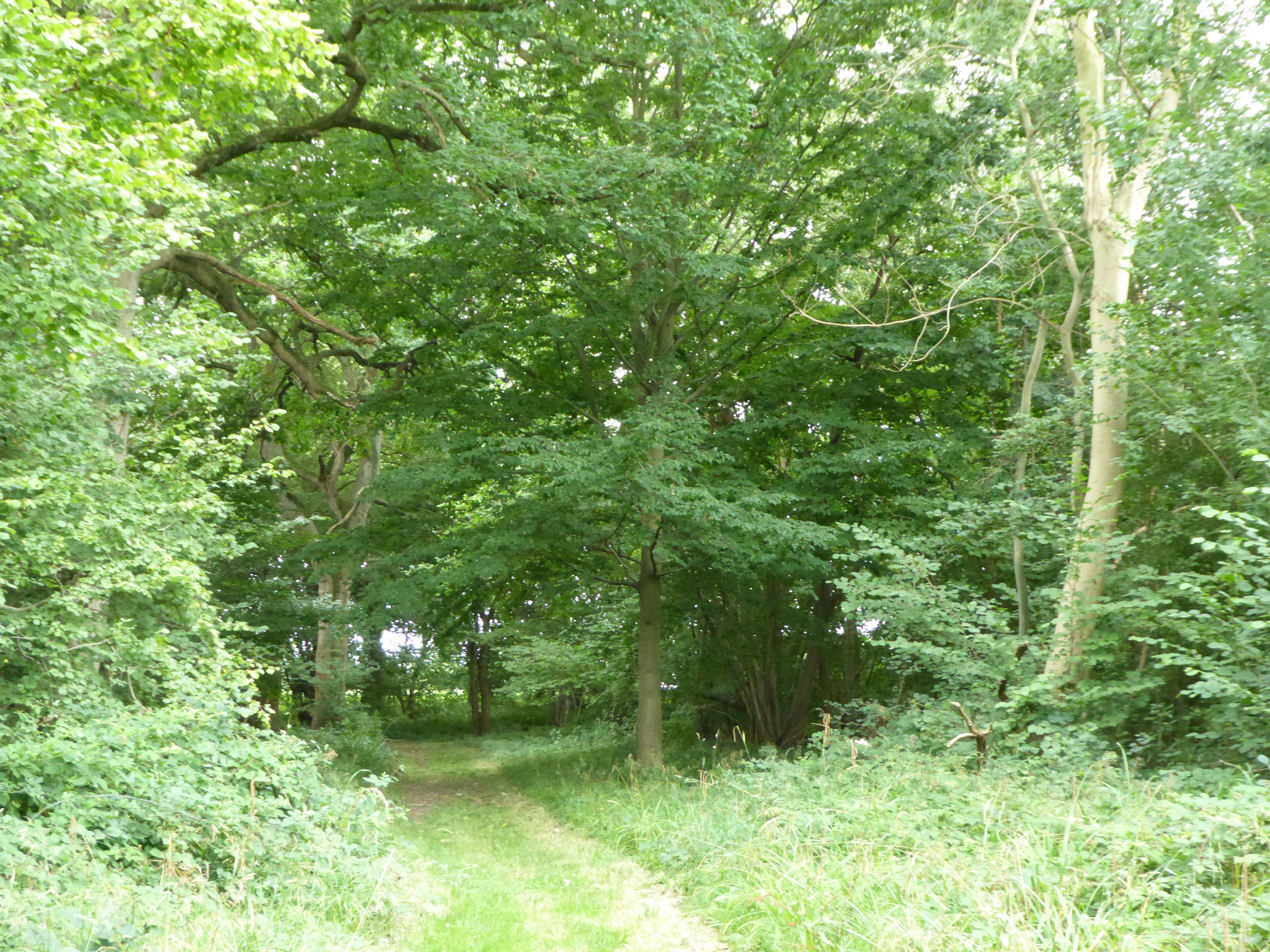
- Path in Thorpe Wood
- Location of Thorpe Morieux Woods.
- Area of search: Suffolk
- Grid reference: TL 942 549
- Interest: Biological
- Area: 45.2 hectares
- Notification date: 1985
- Location map: Magic Map

Thorpe Morieux Woods is a 45.2-hectare (112-acre) biological Site of Special Scientific Interest north of Thorpe Morieux in Suffolk. Part of it is Bull's Wood, a nature reserve managed by the Suffolk Wildlife Trust.

These ancient semi-natural woods are managed by coppicing. The soil is poorly drained boulder clay, and common trees include pedunculate oak. Bramble and dog's mercury are dominant in the ground flora, with extensive oxlip in some areas.

There is access to Bull's Wood, and a footpath goes through Thorpe Wood, but there is no public access to Felsham Wood or Great Hastings Wood.
