= Charles Partridge =

Charles Partridge may refer to:

- Charles Partridge (footballer) (1867– after 1898), English professional footballer
- Charles Partridge (anthropologist) (1872–1955)
- Charlie Partridge (born 1973), American football coach and former player

== See also ==
- Charles Partridge Adams, American landscape artist
