= Bradfield Woods =

Woodlands in Suffolk, England

Coordinates: 52.18°N 0.82°E

- Site of Special Scientific Interest
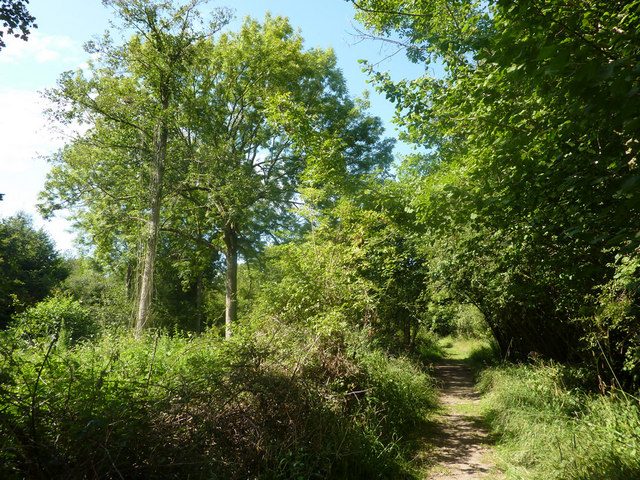
- Location of Bradfield Woods.
- Area of search: Suffolk
- Grid reference: TL 930 576
- Interest: Biological
- Area: 81.4 hectares
- Notification date: 1986
- Location map: Magic Map

Bradfield Woods is an 81.4-hectare (201-acre) biological Site of Special Scientific Interest between Bury St Edmunds and Stowmarket in Suffolk. The site is in three separate blocks, the adjoining Felsham Hall and Monks' Park Woods, and the much smaller separate Hedge Wood and Chen sil Grove. Felsham Hall and Monks' Park Woods are designated a 63.3 National Nature Reserve, also called Bradfield Woods, and are managed by the Suffolk Wildlife Trust.

== History ==
These woods have a history of coppicing with the earliest record dating from 1252.

The Southern part of Monks' Park Woods was cleared for farming during the 1960's apart from a small area preserved thanks to a tree preservation order following action from the local residents. The site was subsequently designed as Site of Special Scientific Interest in 1971. In 1970, the Society for the Promotion of Nature Reserves (SPNR, now called the Wildlife Trust) bought 51 ha of the woods with a second purchase of 12 ha in 1979. Sussex Wildlife Trust leased the land in 1983 and the freehold was transferred in 1999. An additional 7ha was purchased in 2010 but the Trust 's bid to secure the land cleared in the 1960's did not succeed this same year.

== Geology ==
Bradfield Woods is established on a plateau with soils from glacial chalky boulder clay overlain in some place by sand or loess. The soils have not been ploughed for 800 years and the acidity (pH measurements) of it stretches from 3.1 to 7.4.

== Wildlife ==
The site presents a very high diversity of flora, with over 370 plant species recorded. Uncommon woodland flowers include oxlip, herb paris and ramson. There is also a rich variety of fungi, with two species not recorded elsewhere in Britain and a large numbers of Armillaria or honey fungus.

Up to 24 different species of butterflies, such as the purple emperor and the silver-washed fritillary have been recorded. The pearl-bordered fritillary has disappeared from these woods. The large mason bee (Osmia xanthomelana), the beetle Byctiscus populi and the weevil Cionus nigritarsis can be found there.

There is access from Felsham Road west of Gedding.
