= Hintlesham Woods =

Protected area in Suffolk, England

Coordinates: 52.05°N 1.01°E

- Site of Special Scientific Interest
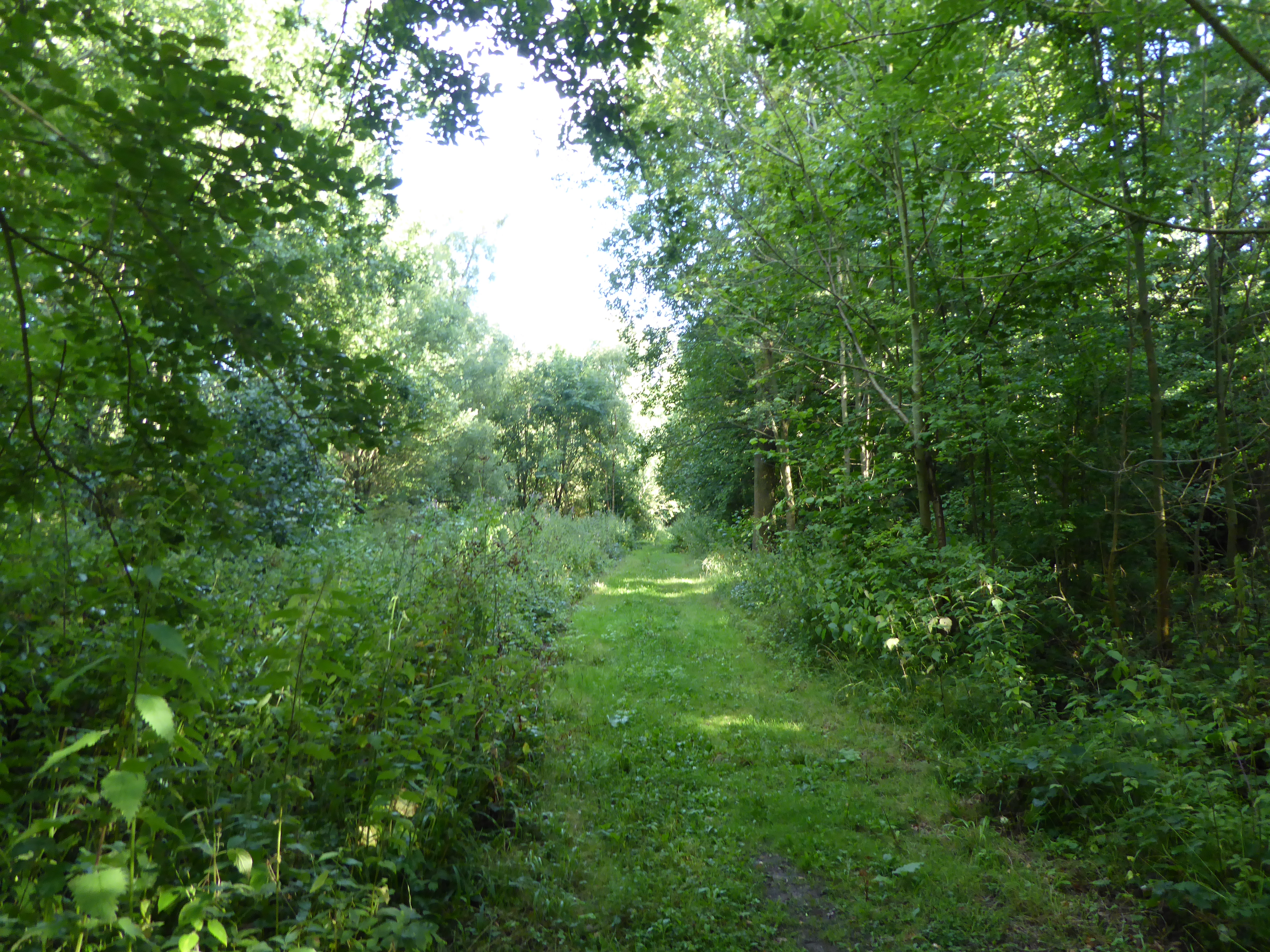
- Footpath in Ramsey Wood
- Location of Hintlesham Woods.
- Area of search: Suffolk
- Grid reference: TM 063 433
- Interest: Biological
- Area: 118.1 hectares
- Notification date: 1986
- Location map: Magic Map

Hintlesham Woods is a 118.1-hectare (292-acre) biological Site of Special Scientific Interest east of Hadleigh in Suffolk. Part of it is Wolves Wood, which is managed by the Royal Society for the Protection of Birds.

These ancient coppice with standards woods are mainly oak with some ash and birch. The soils are boulder clay, which is covered in some areas with glacial sands. Ground flora includes green hellebore, birds-nest orchid and wood spurge.

There are several kinds of woods in two blocks. There is access to footpaths in Wolves Wood and Ramsey Wood, but other areas are private property with no public access.
