= Kingston Wood and Outliers =

Protected area in Cambridgeshire, England

Coordinates: 52.167°N 0.063°W

- Site of Special Scientific Interest
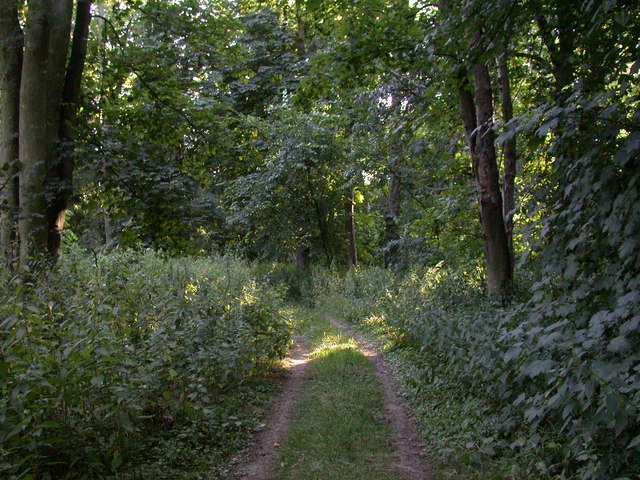
- Location of Kingston Wood and Outliers.
- Area of search: Cambridgeshire
- Grid reference: TL 326 539
- Interest: Biological
- Area: 47.4 hectares
- Notification date: 1984
- Location map: Magic Map

Kingston Wood and Outliers is a 47.4-hectare (117-acre) biological Site of Special Scientific Interest south-west of Kingston in Cambridgeshire. The site comprises Kingston Wood itself, Pincote Wood, Hawk's Wood and Lady Pastures Spinney.

This ancient woodland is ash and field maple on chalky clay, and it is described by Natural England as one of the oldest and most intact coppiced woodlands in the county. Ground flora include dog's mercury and the nationally restricted oxlip.

The site is private with no public access.
