= Ten Wood =

Protected area in Cambridgeshire, England

Coordinates: 52.175°N 0.432°E

- Site of Special Scientific Interest
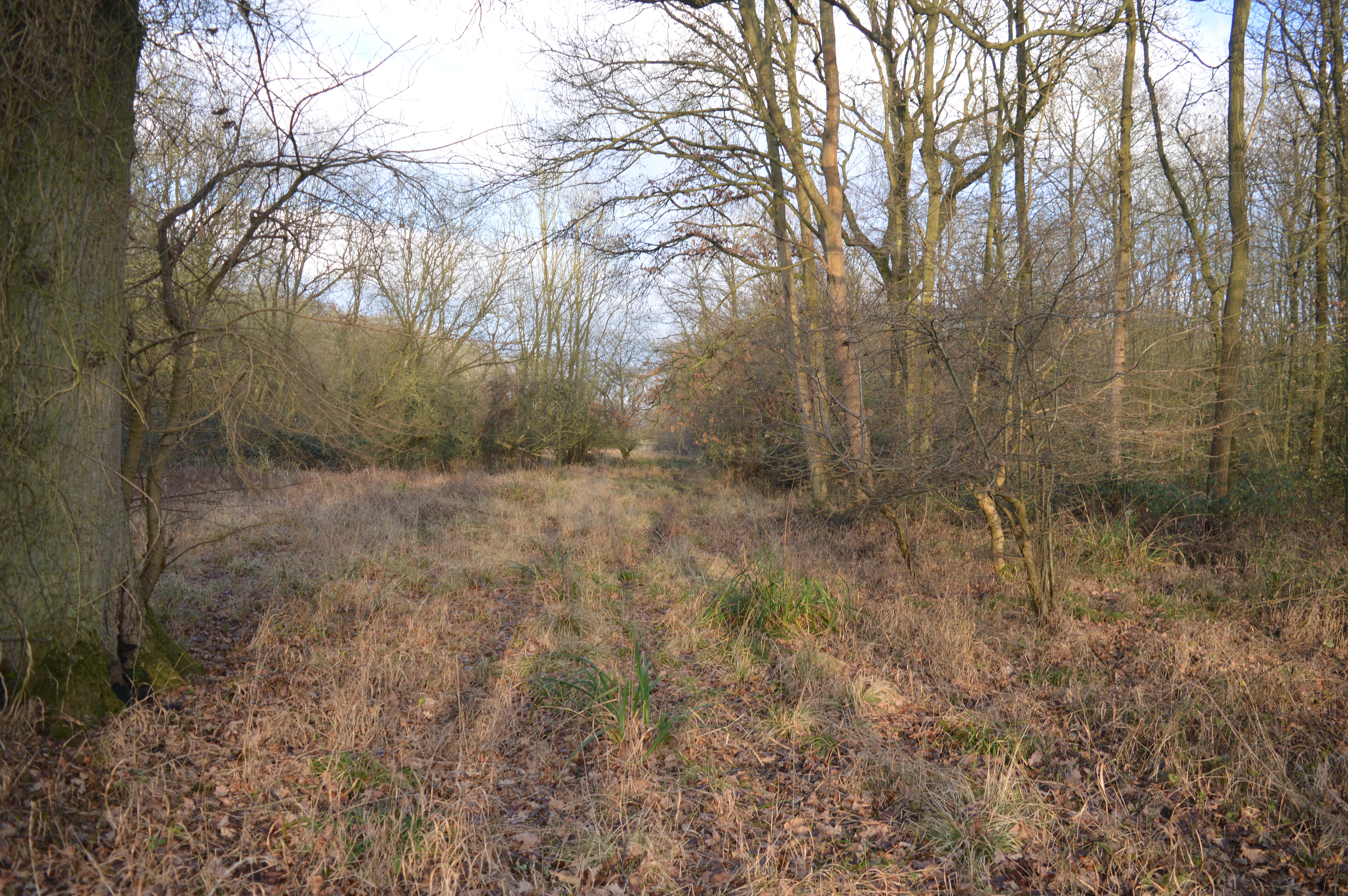
- Location of Ten Wood.
- Area of search: Cambridgeshire
- Grid reference: TL 664 558
- Interest: Biological
- Area: 17.7 hectares
- Notification date: 1983
- Location map: Magic Map

Ten Wood is a 17.7-hectare (44-acre) biological Site of Special Scientific Interest east of Burrough Green in Cambridgeshire.

This ancient wood is of the ash/maple type, which has a high conservation value as it has a restricted and declining distribution. Other trees include hazel and pedunculate oak. There is also a population of the rare oxlip.

The site is private land with no public access.
