= Gamlingay Wood =

Nature reserve in Cambridgeshire, England

Coordinates: 52.165°N 0.187°W

- Site of Special Scientific Interest
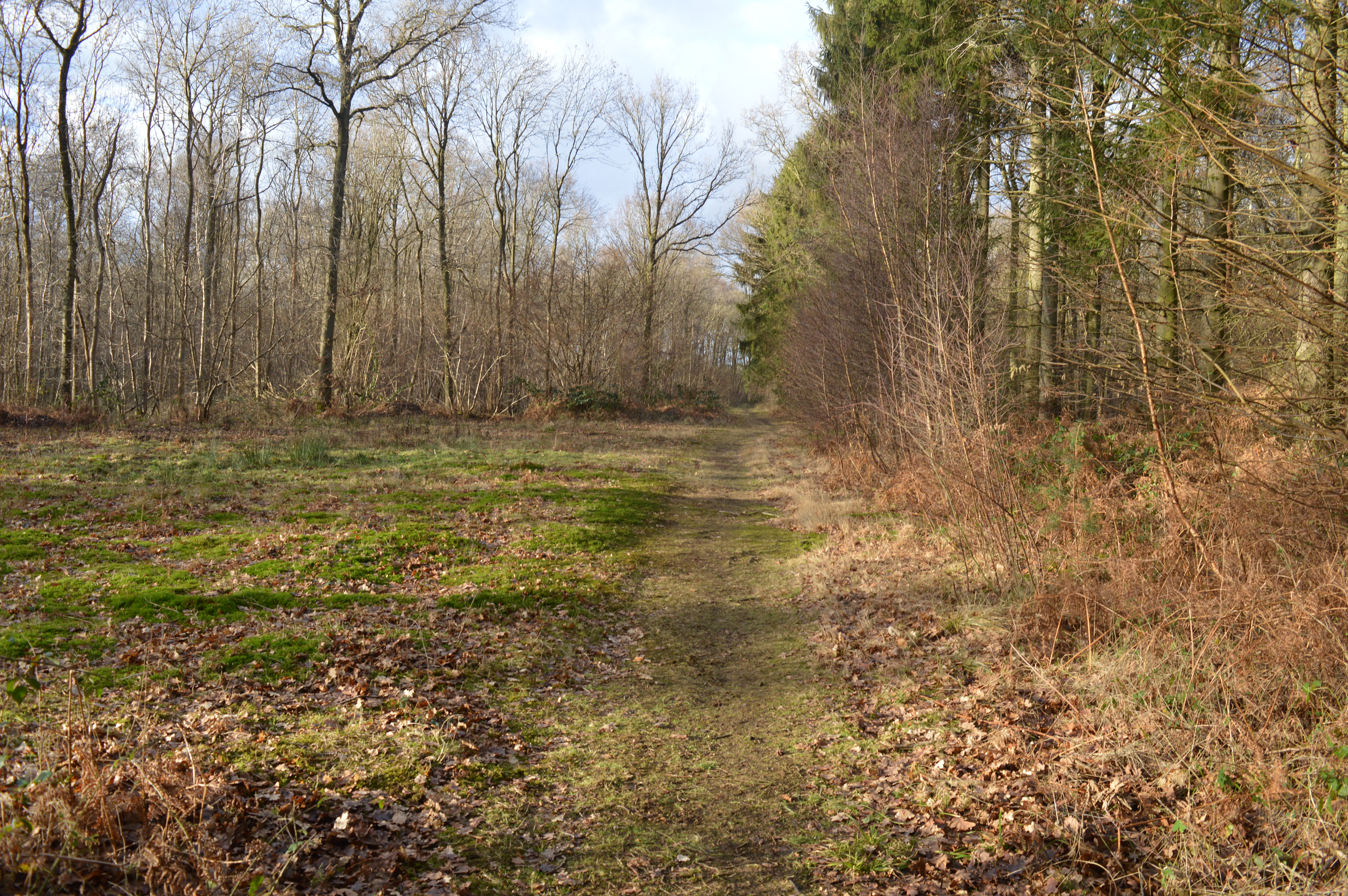
- Location of Gamlingay Wood.
- Area of search: Cambridgeshire
- Grid reference: TL 241 534
- Interest: Biological
- Area: 48.4 hectares
- Notification date: 1983
- Location map: Magic Map

Gamlingay Wood is a 48.4-hectare (120-acre) biological Site of Special Scientific Interest (SSSI) north of Gamlingay in Cambridgeshire. It is managed by the Wildlife Trust for Bedfordshire, Cambridgeshire and Northamptonshire.

This is ancient ash/maple woodland on sandy loam soil, an unusual habitat in lowland England. Ground flora include dog's mercury, yellow archangel, wood anemone and the nationally restricted oxlip. The flora is diverse due to the varied soils, and there are hundreds of species of mushrooms and toadstools. Birds include barn owls, garden warblers and blue tits. The 70-hectare (170-acre) Wildlife Trust site includes Sugley Wood, which is not part of the SSSI.

There is access from Gamlingay Road and by a footpath from Gamlingay village.
