= Out and Plunder Woods =

Protected area in Cambridgeshire, England

Coordinates: 52.166°N 0.423°E

- Site of Special Scientific Interest
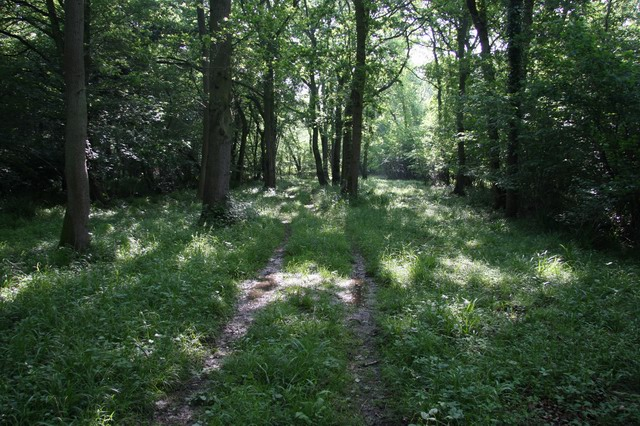
- Location of Out and Plunder Woods.
- Area of search: Cambridgeshire
- Grid reference: TL 658 547
- Interest: Biological
- Area: 38.6 hectares
- Notification date: 1984
- Location map: Magic Map

Out and Plunder Woods is a 38.6-hectare (95-acre) biological Site of Special Scientific Interest between Great Bradley and Burrough Green in Cambridgeshire.

These woods on boulder clay have been little modified since the medieval period, which has allowed the development of a diverse fauna and flora, and grassy trails provide additional habitats. The main trees are ash, field maple and pedunculate oak, and herbs include sweet violet and early dog-violet.

The site is in two blocks, with Out Wood and Sparrows Grove in one, and the smaller Plunder Wood in the other. They are private property, but a public footpath goes through the site between Out Wood and Sparrows Grove.
