= Balsham Wood =

UK Site of Special Scientific Interest

Coordinates: 52.122°N 0.318°E

- Site of Special Scientific Interest
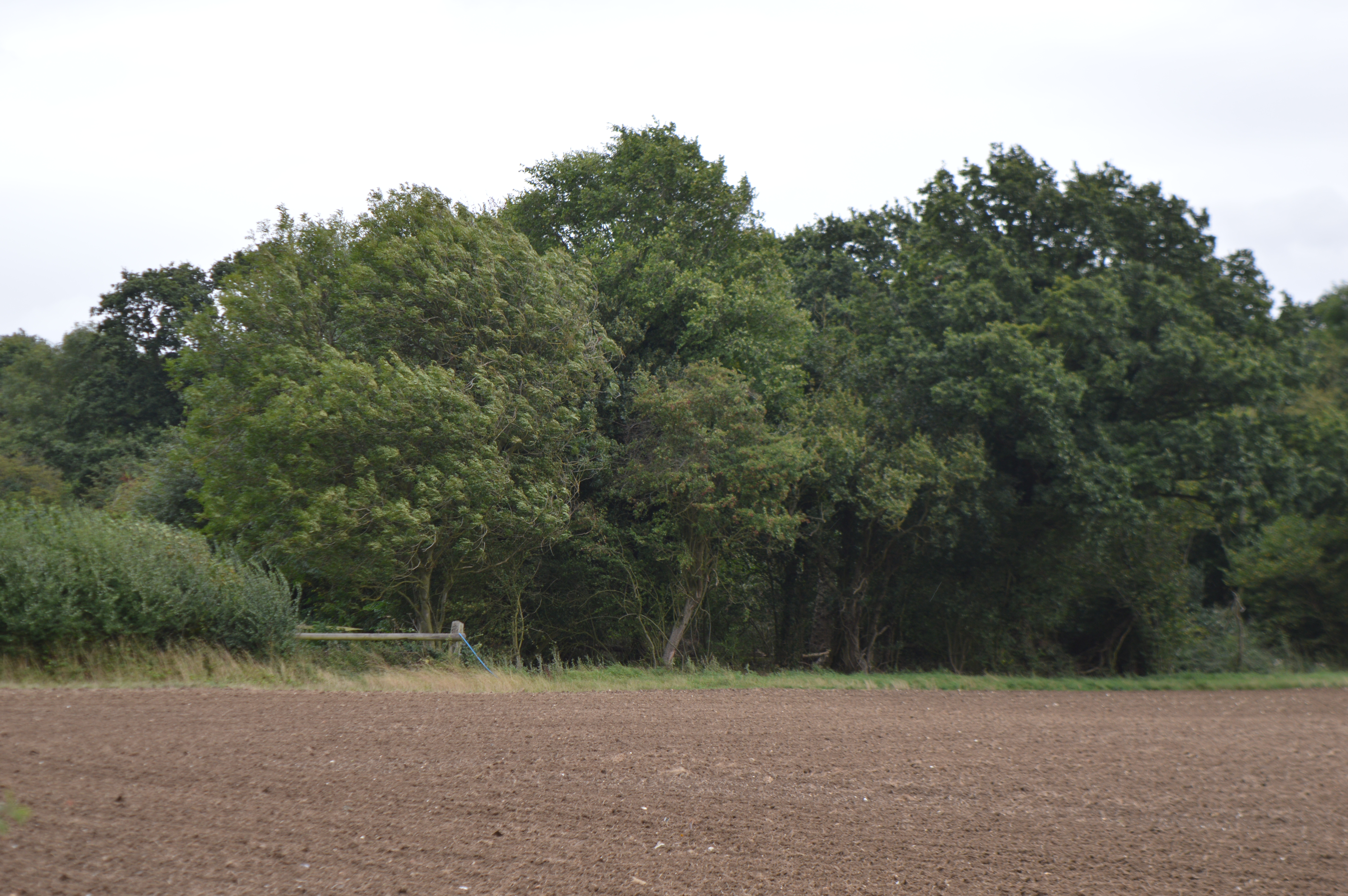
- Location of Balsham Wood.
- Area of search: Cambridgeshire
- Grid reference: TL 588 496
- Interest: Biological
- Area: 35.0 hectares
- Notification date: 1984
- Location map: Magic Map

Balsham Wood is a 35 hectare biological Site of Special Scientific Interest south of Balsham in Cambridgeshire.

This site has one of the last surviving areas of ash and maple woodland on chalky boulder clay. It has diverse flora, including the rare oxlip and a variety of shrubs, such as dogwood. Open grassy rides provide additional habitats.

The site is private land with no public access.
