= Over and Lawn Woods =

Coordinates: 52.11°N 0.39°E

- Site of Special Scientific Interest
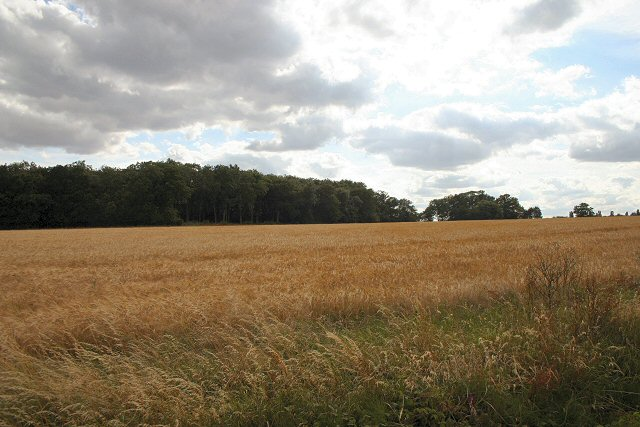
- View of Lawn Wood
- Location of Over and Lawn Woods.
- Area of search: Suffolk
- Grid reference: TL 635 483
- Interest: Biological
- Area: 43.3 hectares
- Notification date: 1984
- Location map: Magic Map

Over and Lawn Woods is a 43.3-hectare (107-acre) biological Site of Special Scientific Interest north-west of Haverhill in Suffolk. It is listed by Natural England as a Suffolk site but most of Over Wood is in Cambridgeshire.

These are ancient coppice with standards woods on chalky boulder clay, and the dominant trees are pedunculate oak and ash. The fauna and flora is diverse, including the nationally restricted oxlip. A stream and pond provide additional ecological interest.

The site is private land with no public access.
