= West Blean =

Woodland in Kent, England

West Blean is an area of ancient semi-natural woodland with SSSI status, 5km north of the city of Canterbury in Kent, England, also including Thornden Wood. It is managed by the Kent Wildlife Trust.

This reserve makes up a substantial portion of the Blean complex, potentially covering thousands of hectares, and forming one of the largest concentrated tracts of ancient semi-natural woodland in England. The reserve itself covers some 489 hectares purchased in December 2003 and the Trust continues to seek further opportunities to expand the site.

== Location ==
The woodland is located between Blean Woods and East Blean Woods some 5km north of Canterbury City centre. It is accessible by car, or by bus from Canterbury, and walkways have been constructed within the wood.

There are car parks within the woods, and a charge is made for parking.

== Ecology ==
40% of the reserve is densely planted conifer plantation and 40% is sweet chestnut coppice plantation. The remaining 20% is mixed native deciduous woodland. Nightjars and nightingale are present. Common cow-wheat, the foodplant of the caterpillar of the heath fritillary is already present in some parts of the wood.

== Conservation ==
West Blean (and Thornden Wood) forms an important part of a wider conservation jigsaw, linking the Blean Woods National Nature Reserve in the west with East Blean Woods in the east, and thereby establishing a continuous nature conservation complex owned and managed by a partnership of bodies including other conservation organisations, statutory bodies and local planning authorities.

In the coming years, Kent Wildlife Trust will be working to remove the conifer plantations and restore the ancient woodland habitat and associated species. The Trust will also establish and maintain an annual coppice management programme, which will benefit the nationally rare heath fritillary and white admiral butterflies, and many other species, including bluebell, wood anemone, long-eared owl, yellow necked wood mouse and dormouse. In the even longer term the aim will be to diversify the sweet chestnut coppice by restoring native coppice species such as hazel, hornbeam and oak.

== Sources ==
- West Blean and Thornden Woods, The Wildlife Trusts
- The Blean web page
- SSSI listing, Natural England
