= Weaveley and Sand Woods =

Protected area in Cambridgeshire, England

Coordinates: 52.171°N 0.209°W

- Site of Special Scientific Interest
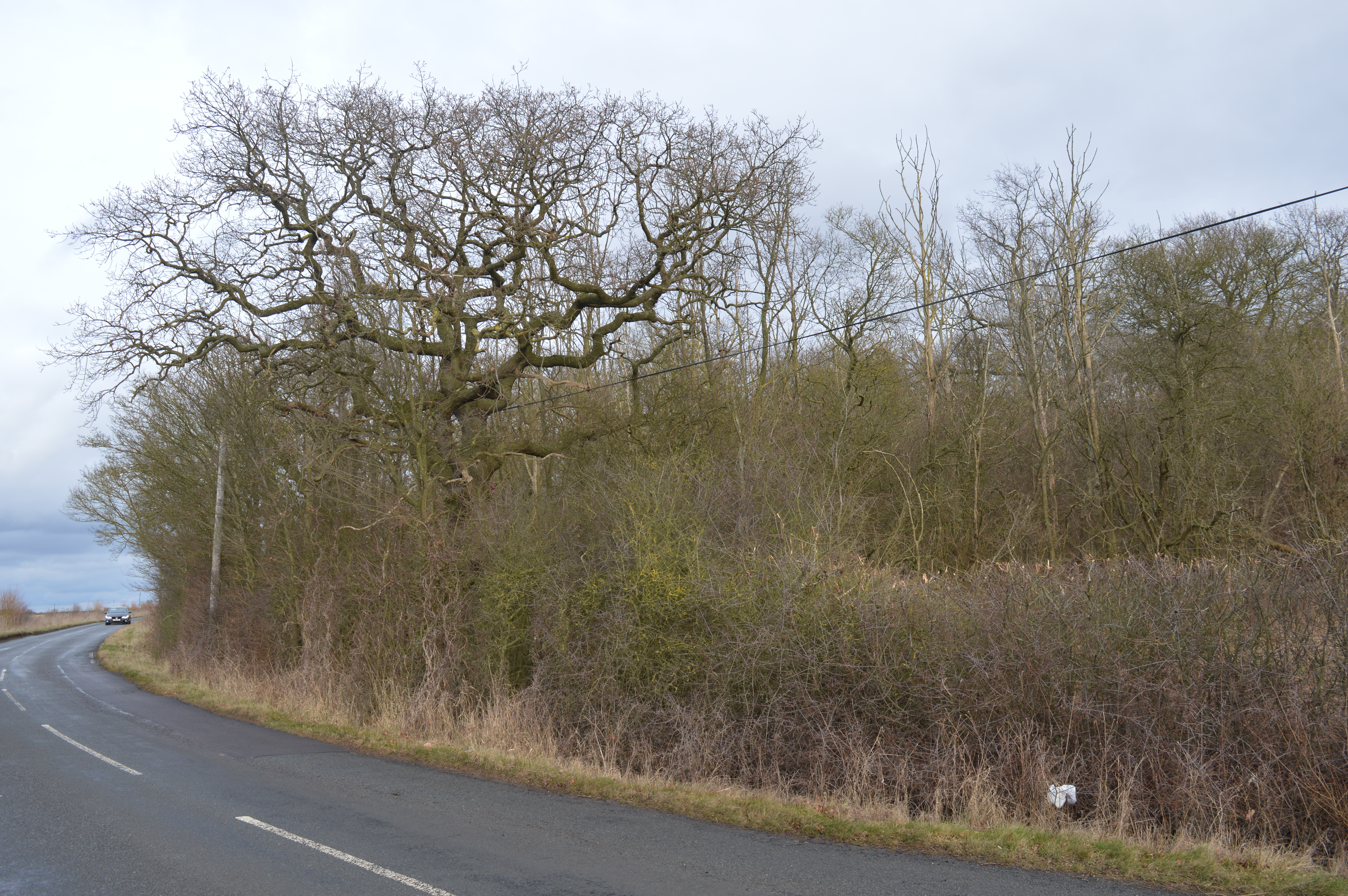
- Location of Weaveley and Sand Woods.
- Area of search: Cambridgeshire
- Grid reference: TL 226 540
- Interest: Biological
- Area: 62.0 hectares
- Notification date: 1983
- Location map: Magic Map

Weaveley and Sand Woods is a 62.0-hectare (153-acre) biological Site of Special Scientific Interest north of Gamlingay in Cambridgeshire.

This site has an unusually varied geology, with areas of free-draining Lower Greensand, poorly drained boulder clay and Jurassic clays. The wood is of ancient origin, and tree species include pedunculate oak and coppiced ash and field maple. Hazel is dominant in the shrub layer. There are uncommon flowers such as herb-paris, butterfly orchid and pignut.

The site is private land with no public access.
