= Aversley Wood =

Woodland in Cambridgeshire, England

Coordinates: 52.423°N 0.294°W

- Site of Special Scientific Interest
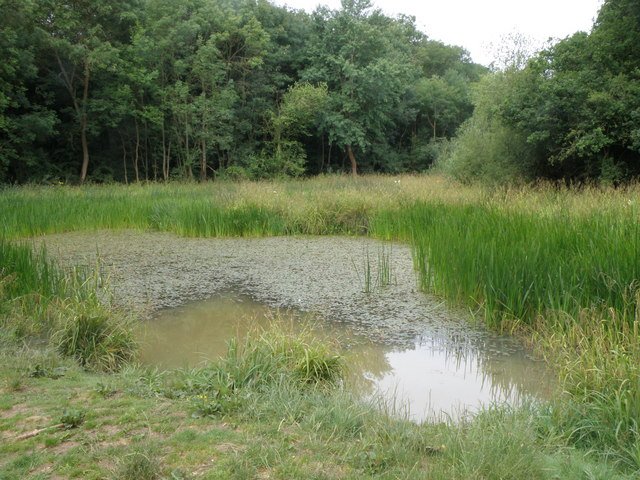
- Location of Aversley Wood.
- Area of search: Cambridgeshire
- Grid reference: TL 161 819
- Interest: Biological
- Area: 62.3 hectares (154 acres)
- Notification date: 1983
- Location map: Magic Map

Aversley Wood is a 62.3 hectares (154 acres) biological Site of Special Scientific Interest south-west of Sawtry in Cambridgeshire. It is owned and managed by the Woodland Trust.

This wood is ash and maple on heavy clay soils, with much of it being ancient and having diverse flora and fauna as a result. Another area, which was probably cultivated until around 1350, has medieval ridge and furrow. It has a number of wild service trees, which are uncommon and an indicator of ancient woodland.

There is access from Bullock Road.
