= Little Paxton Wood =

Protected area in Cambridgeshire, England

Coordinates: 52.258°N 0.290°W

- Site of Special Scientific Interest
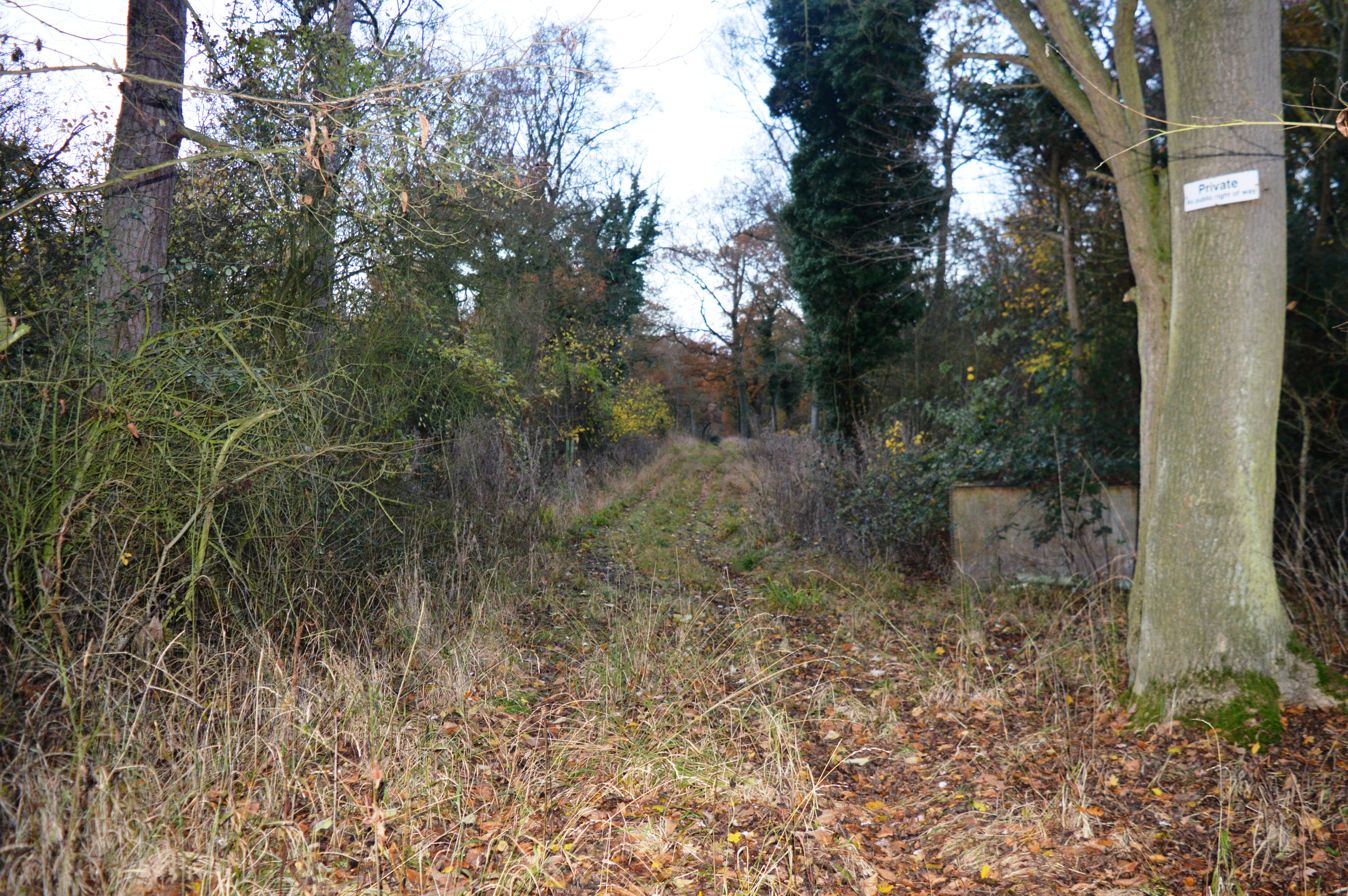
- Location of Little Paxton Wood.
- Area of search: Cambridgeshire
- Grid reference: TL 168 636
- Interest: Biological
- Area: 44.1 hectares
- Notification date: 1989
- Location map: Magic Map

Little Paxton Wood is a 44.1-hectare biological Site of Special Scientific Interest west of Little Paxton in Cambridgeshire.

This ancient wood is wet ash and maple on heavy calcareous clay, with seasonally waterlogged soils, and it has an extremely diverse flora. A double bank and ditch has wood melick, sweet violet and the nationally restricted spiked star-of-Bethlehem.

The site is private land owned by the Church Commissioners, with no public access.
