= Bull's Wood =

12 hectare nature reserve east of Cockfield in Suffolk, England

Coordinates: 52.159°N 0.803°E

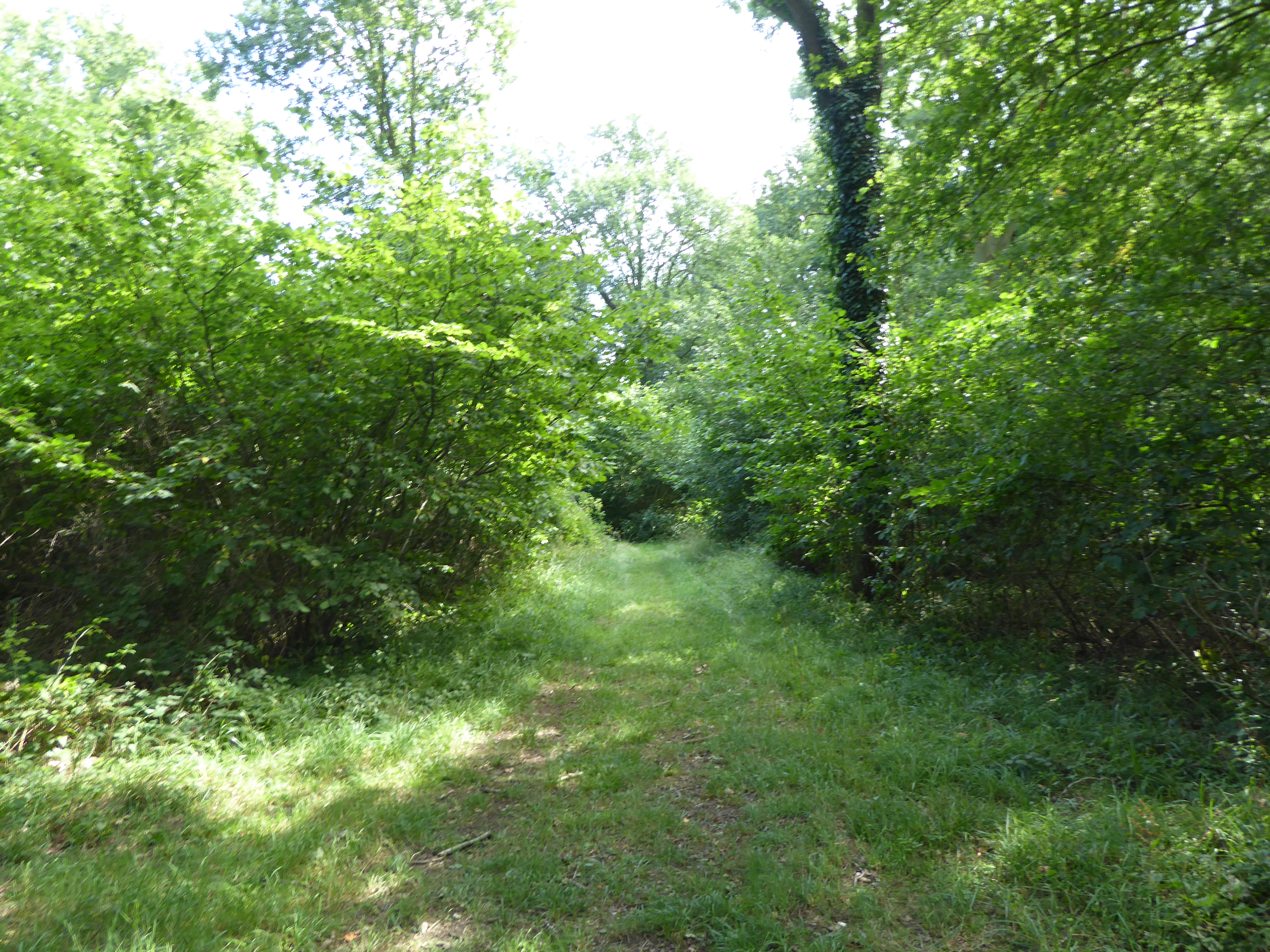
- Interactive map of Bull's Wood
- Type: Nature reserve
- Location: Cockfield, Suffolk
- OS grid: TL918549
- Area: 12 hectares (30 acres)
- Manager: Suffolk Wildlife Trust

Bull's Wood is a 12 hectare nature reserve east of Cockfield in Suffolk, England. It is managed by the Suffolk Wildlife Trust, and is part of the Thorpe Morieux Woods Site of Special Scientific Interest.

Flora in this wood include early-purple orchids, herb-paris and the uncommon oxlips. There are roe deer, marsh tits, and butterflies such as gatekeepers, speckled woods and orange tips.

There is access by a footpath from Palmers Farm.
