= Charles Partridge (anthropologist) =

English anthropologist and historian

- Born: 10 February 1872; Offton, Sufolk
- Died: 21 December 1955 (aged 83)
- Citizenship: England
- Education: Queen Elizabeth School, Ipswich; Christ's College, Cambridge
- Occupations: Anthropologist and historian

Charles Stanley Partridge (10 February 1872 – 21 December 1955) was an English anthropologist and historian with a particular focus on Suffolk, and former colonial administrator in Nigeria.

== Early life ==
Partridge was born at Offton Place, Offton, Suffolk, the elder son of Charles Thomas Partridge, later of Sulley's Manor Farm at Raydon and of Stowmarket, and his wife Catherine Pleasance, daughter of William Robert Hewitt, of The Rookery, Stowmarket. The Partridges were a family of wealthy yeoman farmers of whose Suffolk roots Partridge was very proud (all but one of his great-great-grandparents being born in that county). The earliest known ancestor of the Partridge family was yeoman farmer Thomas Partridge, of Higham and Capel St. Mary, Suffolk, born circa 1560. The family also owned Shelley Hall, where Partridge's father farmed between 1872 and 1875. He was educated at Queen Elizabeth School, Ipswich- where he was a younger contemporary of the writer H. Rider Haggard- and at Christ's College, Cambridge, where he took a B.A. in Theology in 1895, and an M.A. in 1901. His interest in the humanities led him to become a Fellow of the Royal Geographical Society (1903), Fellow of the Society of Antiquaries (1904), and elected member of the council of the Suffolk Institute of Archaeology.

== Colonial Service career ==
Partridge joined the Colonial Service as a district officer and in 1901 was appointed District Commissioner in Southern Nigeria. He later held this position at the Obubura Hill District, Ikot Ekpene, and Meko, West Province, and was also a political officer. He served as Acting Chief Assistant Colonial Secretary in 1908, before being appointed to represent Southern Nigeria in the delimitation of Anglo-French Nigeria/ Dahomey in January 1909, representing Northern Nigeria in establishing the boundaries of Ekiti country in February of that year. He was subsequently based at Badagri and Idaban. During his time in Nigeria, Partridge wrote a book, Cross River Natives: notes on the primitive pagans of Obubura District, published in 1905. He met and befriended the missionary Mary Slessor, in 1950 donating letters from her- and a recording of her voice- to the Glasgow record office; he said of her: "She was a very remarkable woman. I look back on her friendship with reverence- one of the greatest honours that have befallen me." Partridge left Nigeria in 1915, subsequently serving in the Army in Greece and Italy (where he was a Railway Transport Officer) during World War I as a Staff Lieutenant.

== Anthropological research and later life ==
Returning to his home county of Suffolk after the war, Partridge resumed his interests in local history and genealogy. His school had been closely linked to the Ipswich Museum, the headmasters sitting on its committee; Partridge donated his collections from Nigeria to the museum's already extensive ethnographic displays, as well as to the British Museum. He compiled and published Portraits in Suffolk Houses with his friends Prince Frederick Duleep Singh and Rev. Edmund Farrer, undertook extensive research into local families, including his own, and was founder and editor of The Suffolk Miscellany, a genealogical and local historical journal, and editor of East Anglian Notes. He contributed a series of articles under the name "Silly Suffolk" to the East Anglian Daily Times from 1919 to 1927. His network of contacts was extensive, and included the antiquary Nina Layard.

Partridge died at Stowmarket aged 83. His obituary in The Times of 10 January 1956 quoted a friend who called him: "a born scholar, with an excellent memory, wide interests, exact knowledge, a love of truth and a dislike of pomposity, inaccuracy and humbug." His extensive collections he had meticulously organised and prepared for their new owners, including the Ipswich Public Library, to which he left 387 files and 28 foolscap volumes of Suffolk pedigrees and notes, now at the Suffolk Record Office at Ipswich, where they constitute part of the Local Studies collection.
