= Salcey Forest =

Medieval hunting forest in Northamptonshire, England

Coordinates: 52.15°N 0.83°W

- Site of Special Scientific Interest
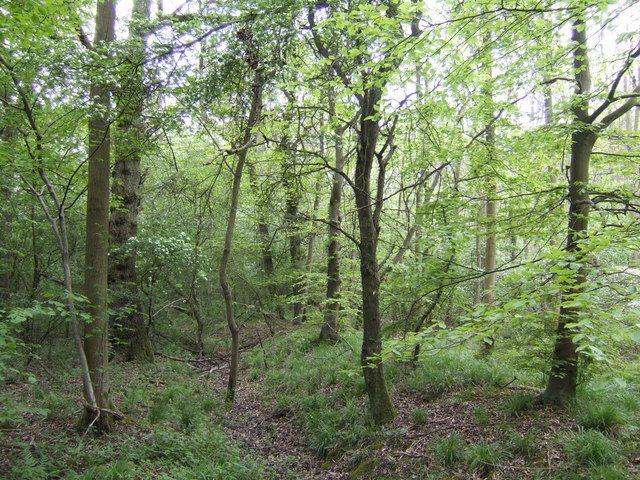
- Location of Salcey Forest.
- Area of search: Northamptonshire
- Grid reference: SP 809 510
- Interest: Biological
- Area: 159.6 hectares (394 acres)
- Notification date: 1984
- Location map: Magic Map

Salcey Forest is a fragment of a former medieval hunting forest east of the village of Hartwell, between Northampton and Newport Pagnell in Northamptonshire. It is managed by Forestry England and to promote biodiversity, and is also commercially exploited for timber products. The eastern third of the forest, an area of 159.6 hectares, is a biological Site of Special Scientific Interest (SSSI).

== Description ==
In 2005, a tree-top forest walk was constructed which has attracted many visitors and rises through the forest to a height of about 15 metres (49 ft), at a gradient not exceeding 1 in 12. At the end, a raised viewing platform sits above it at 18 metres (59 ft) from the ground, which is accessed by stairs. Northampton town can be seen from the top of the final tower. The project was placed first in the Environmental category of the British Construction Industry Awards 2006. There is a similar but longer raised walkway at Kew Gardens. In May 2018 the raised walkway was closed to the public following health and safety concerns.

There are public footpaths through the forest and a range of wildlife can be observed. The forest is a remnant of the medieval royal hunting forest. Reminders of the past can still be found, with several miles of ancient woodland, building remains and ancient trees. The 'druids' or veteran oaks in Salcey are rare and distinct wildlife habitats, and some of the veteran oaks are believed to be over 500 years old.

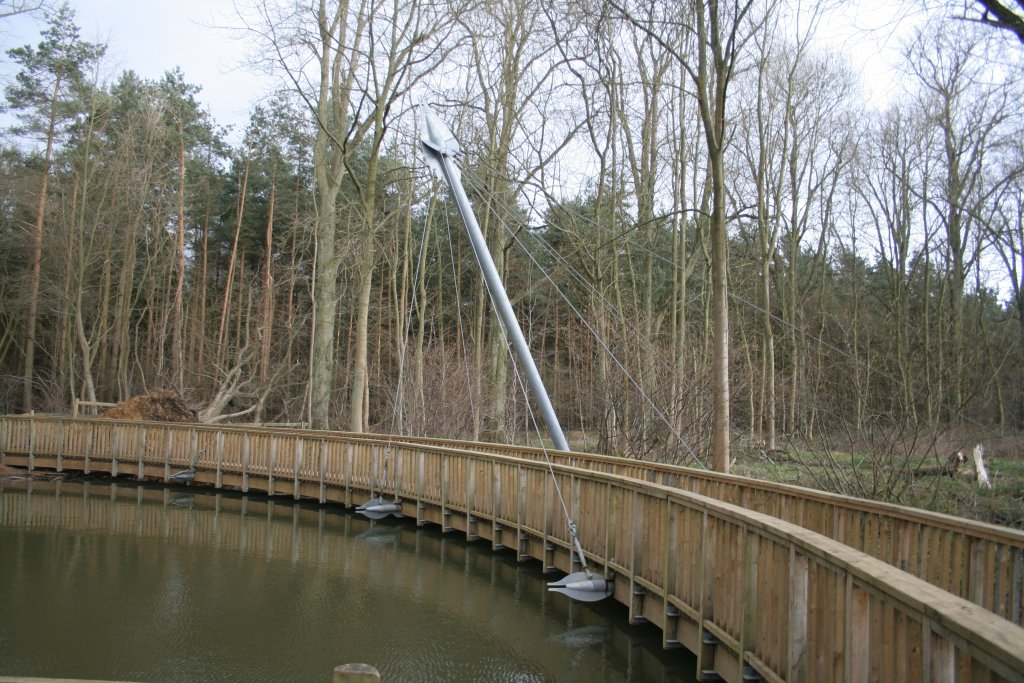
Bridge over 'The Elephant Pond'

The forest has a café in one of the main parking areas – which is pay and display, next to the children's play area – most of the remaining parking areas in the forest are free. It is an official Bookcrossingzone and has two bookshelves where books can be left or taken for free. The cafe closes at 16.00 hours in the winter, and the park itself at 17.00 hours.

During the Second World War, elephants from circuses were put to use to fell trees. There is a pond named 'The Elephant Pond' where the elephants could bathe at the end of the day. The forest was served by its own railway station on the Stratford-upon-Avon and Midland Junction Railway until 1908.

Since October 2019, Salcey Forest has hosted a parkrun, a free, weekly timed five kilometres (3.1 mi) walk/run every Saturday morning at 9am.

== Ecology ==
This is the largest ancient wood in the county and the SSSI has most of the mature oak trees. The diverse ground flora includes bluebells, false brome, pendulous sedge and enchanter's nightshade. There are many breeding birds and nationally notable moth species. The forest also supports biodiversity initiatives, with designated areas aimed at preserving native species and habitats.

== Trails ==
Salcey Forest features several marked walking and cycling trails. The Elephant Walk is a short circular route of 1.2 miles suitable for families. The Church Path Walk covers approximately 3 miles, offering a deeper experience of the woodland. For cyclists, the 6-mile Woodpecker Trail is a popular option. Many of the main trails in Salcey Forest are flat and surfaced, making them accessible for wheelchairs and pushchairs.

== Access ==
There is access by a track from Hartwell. Parking is available daily except Christmas Day. Charges apply, with prices ranging from £3.80 for one hour to £9.00 for a full day.

== See also ==
- Ancient woodland

== Facilities ==
Salcey Forest includes a café, children's play area, cycle hire, accessible toilets, baby changing facilities, picnic areas, and a visitor centre.
