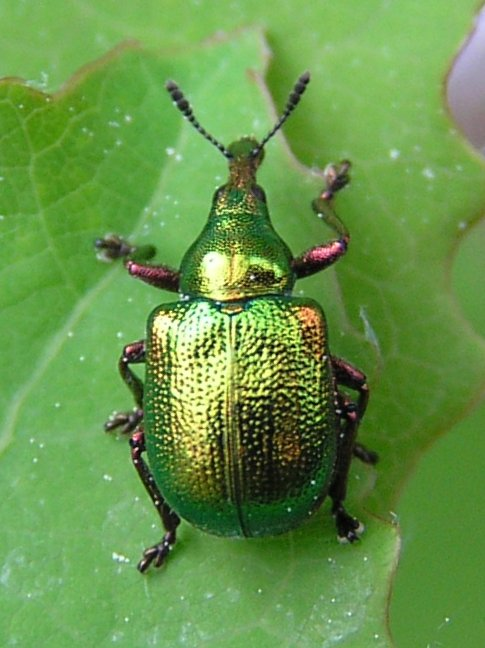
- Byctiscus populi

Scientific classification
- Kingdom: Animalia
- Phylum: Arthropoda
- Clade: Pancrustacea
- Class: Insecta
- Order: Coleoptera
- Suborder: Polyphaga
- Infraorder: Cucujiformia
- Superfamily: Curculionoidea
- Family: Attelabidae
- Genus: Byctiscus; Thomson, 1859

= Byctiscus =

Genus of beetles

Byctiscus is a genus of beetles belonging to the family Attelabidae. Species of the genus are found in Europe and Japan.

== Species ==
The following species are recognised in the genus Byctiscus:

- Byctiscus alni Reitter, 1888
- Byctiscus amurensis Voss, 1930
- Byctiscus angusticollis Legalov, 2007
- Byctiscus aureus Angelov, 1964
- Byctiscus betulae (C.Linnaeus, 1758)
- Byctiscus betuleti Motsch., 1860
- Byctiscus bilineatoides Legalov, 2007
- Byctiscus bilineatus Legalov, 2003
- Byctiscus chinensis Formanek, 1911
- Byctiscus cicatricosus Faust, 1890
- Byctiscus clavicornis Voss, 1935
- Byctiscus coerulans Voss, 1929
- Byctiscus coeruleata Voss, 1952
- Byctiscus collaris Voss, 1931
- Byctiscus complanatus Voss, 1933
- Byctiscus congener Fst., 1882
- Byctiscus congenerprinceps Schilsky, 1903
- Byctiscus cupreus Wasmann, 1887
- Byctiscus cuprifer Schilsky, 1903
- Byctiscus cuprinus Schilsky, 1903
- Byctiscus cyanicolor Voss, 1920
- Byctiscus davidiani Legalov, 2003
- Byctiscus davidis Faust, 1887
- Byctiscus destitutus Voss, 1930
- Byctiscus diversicolor Kolbe, 1886
- Byctiscus fausti Sharp, 1889
- Byctiscus formosanus Legalov, 2007
- Byctiscus foveostriatus Voss, 1930
- Byctiscus fukienensi Voss, 1949
- Byctiscus fulminans Voss, 1930
- Byctiscus gibbirostris Schilsky, 1906
- Byctiscus haroldi Roelofs, 1879
- Byctiscus himalayaensis Legalov, 2007
- Byctiscus hime Kono, 1929
- Byctiscus impressus Voss, 1930
- Byctiscus inermis Dalla Torre & Voss, 1937
- Byctiscus intermedius Voss, 1931
- Byctiscus kresli Legalov, 2003
- Byctiscus lacunipennis Voss, 1930
- Byctiscus lucidus Voss, 1931
- Byctiscus marina Voss, 1921
- Byctiscus morosus Voss, 1942
- Byctiscus motschulskyi Sharp, 1889
- Byctiscus moupinensis Legalov, 2007
- Byctiscus mutator Faust, 1890
- Byctiscus nigripes Faust, 1882
- Byctiscus nigritulus Schilsky, 1889
- Byctiscus nispinus Dalla Torre & Voss, 1937
- Byctiscus nitens Schilsky, 1903
- Byctiscus obscurecyaneus Faust, 1890
- Byctiscus obscuricuprea Voss, 1920
- Byctiscus omissus Voss, 1920
- Byctiscus parvulus Sharp, 1889
- Byctiscus patruelis Voss, 1922
- Byctiscus paviei Voss, 1921
- Byctiscus populi (C.Linnaeus, 1758)
- Byctiscus princeps Voss, 1943
- Byctiscus puberulus Voss, 1943
- Byctiscus regalis Kono, 1936
- Byctiscus regularis Voss, 1930
- Byctiscus reversus Sharp, 1889
- Byctiscus rugosus Voss, 1930
- Byctiscus sculpturatus Voss, 1930
- Byctiscus semicuprea Voss, 1930
- Byctiscus separandus Voss, 1930
- Byctiscus siamensis Legalov, 2007
- Byctiscus similaris Voss, 1920
- Byctiscus subauratus Voss, 1943
- Byctiscus subpectitus Voss, 1943
- Byctiscus subtilis Voss, 1930
- Byctiscus sumbaensis Voss, 1935
- Byctiscus tartaricus Faust, 1882
- Byctiscus thibetana Voss, 1933
- Byctiscus transbaikalia Voss, 1930
- Byctiscus transbaicalica Voss, 1930
- Byctiscus tsherskyi Suvorov, 1915
- Byctiscus venustus Sharp, 1889
- Byctiscus violaceus Voss, 1930
- Byctiscus viridis Dalla Torre & Voss, 1937
- Byctiscus viridulus Westh., 1882
- Byctiscus yunnanicus Voss, 1930

== Gallery ==
Leaf-rolling weevils (Byctiscus populi) mating
