= Woodeaton Wood =

Protected area in Oxfordshire, England

Coordinates: 51.796°N 1.218°W

- Site of Special Scientific Interest
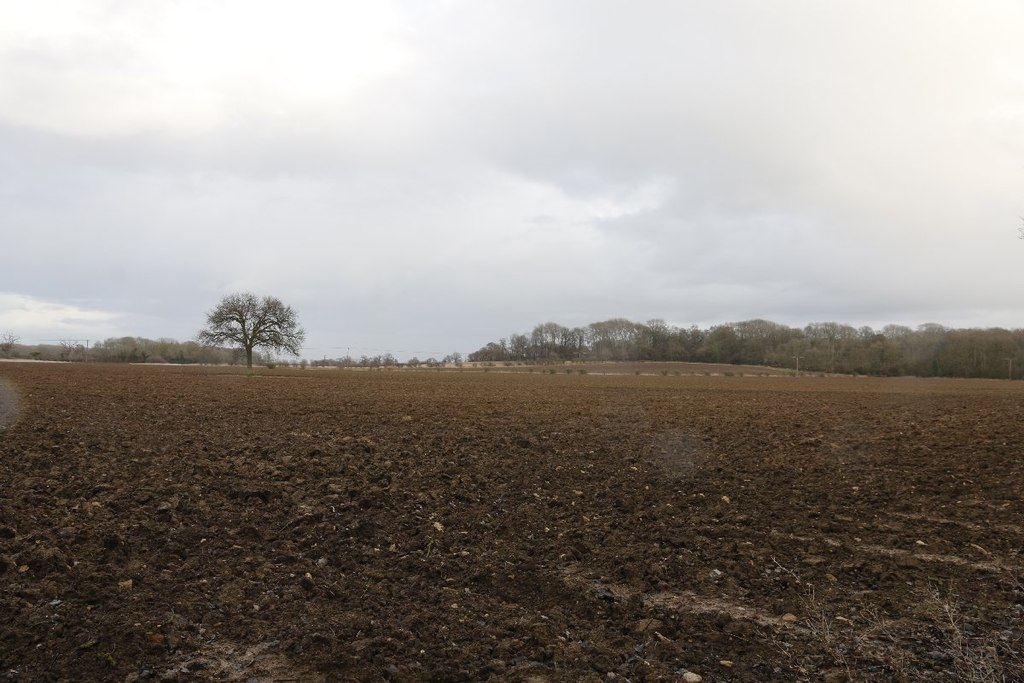
- Location of Woodeaton Wood.
- Area of search: Oxfordshire
- Grid reference: SP 540 111
- Interest: Biological
- Area: 14.0 hectares (35 acres)
- Notification date: 1986
- Location map: Magic Map

Woodeaton Wood is a 14-hectare (35-acre) biological Site of Special Scientific Interest north of Oxford in Oxfordshire.

This coppice with standards on calcareous soil is a fragment of the ancient Shotover Forest. The ground layer has plants such as wood anemone, nettle-leaved bellflower, ramsons, goldilocks buttercup, early dog-violet and enchanter's nightshade.

The site is private land with no public access.
