= Druid oak =

Large oak tree

A druid oak is a large oak tree found in many ancient forests in Britain. Many such forests have been named druid oaks. There are also rare examples at Salcey Forest, in Northamptonshire. Typically such trees will be hundreds of years old. The name relates to the ancient druids who met in forests' oak groves and in particular beneath the old oak trees. One etymology of the word druid comes from "dru-wid", which means "knower of oak trees".

== See also ==
- Ancient woodland
