= Great Bradley =

Village in Suffolk, England

Coordinates: 52.15°N 0.433°E

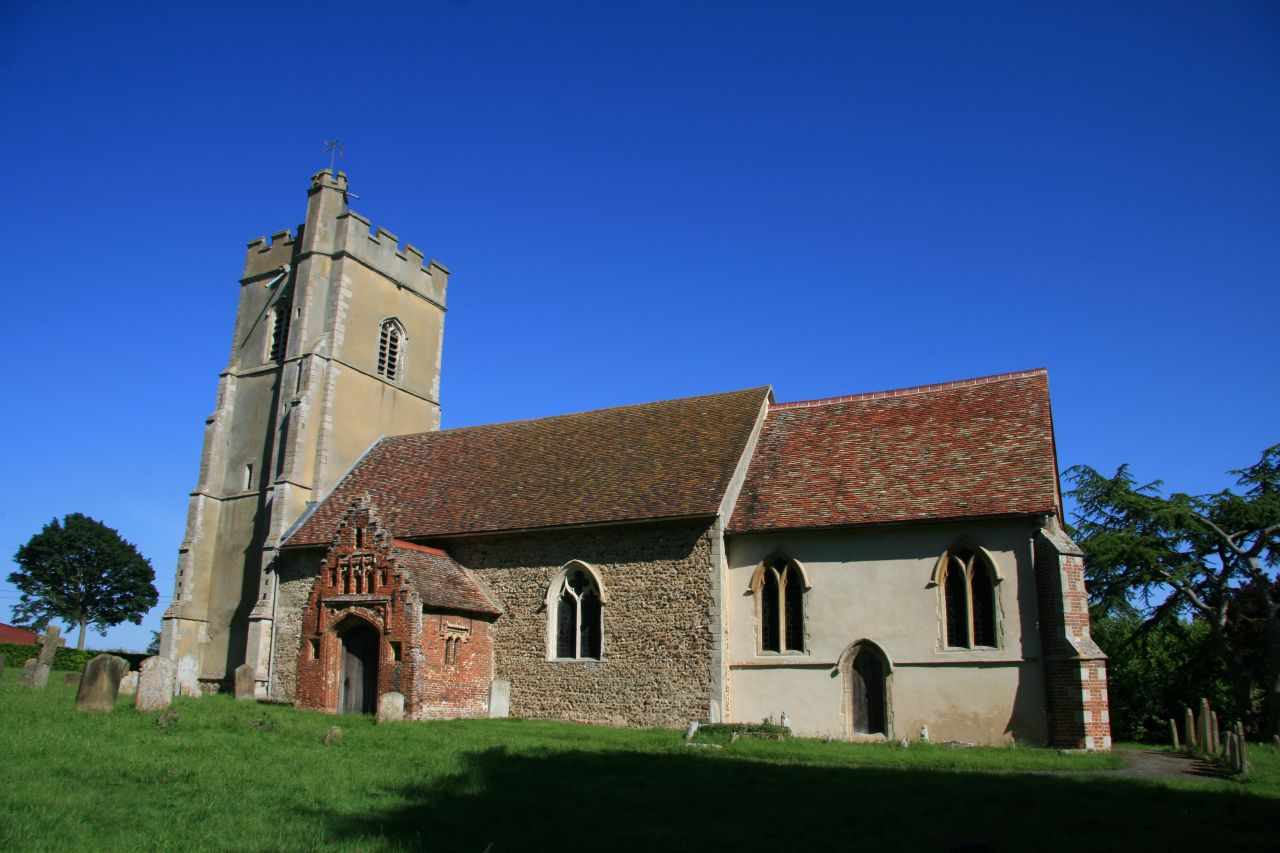
- St Mary's Church, Great Bradley

- Location within Suffolk
- Population: 431 (2011)
- District: West Suffolk
- Shire county: Suffolk
- Region: East
- Country: England
- Sovereign state: United Kingdom
- Post town: Newmarket
- Postcode district: CB8
- Dialling code: 01440
- UK Parliament: West Suffolk

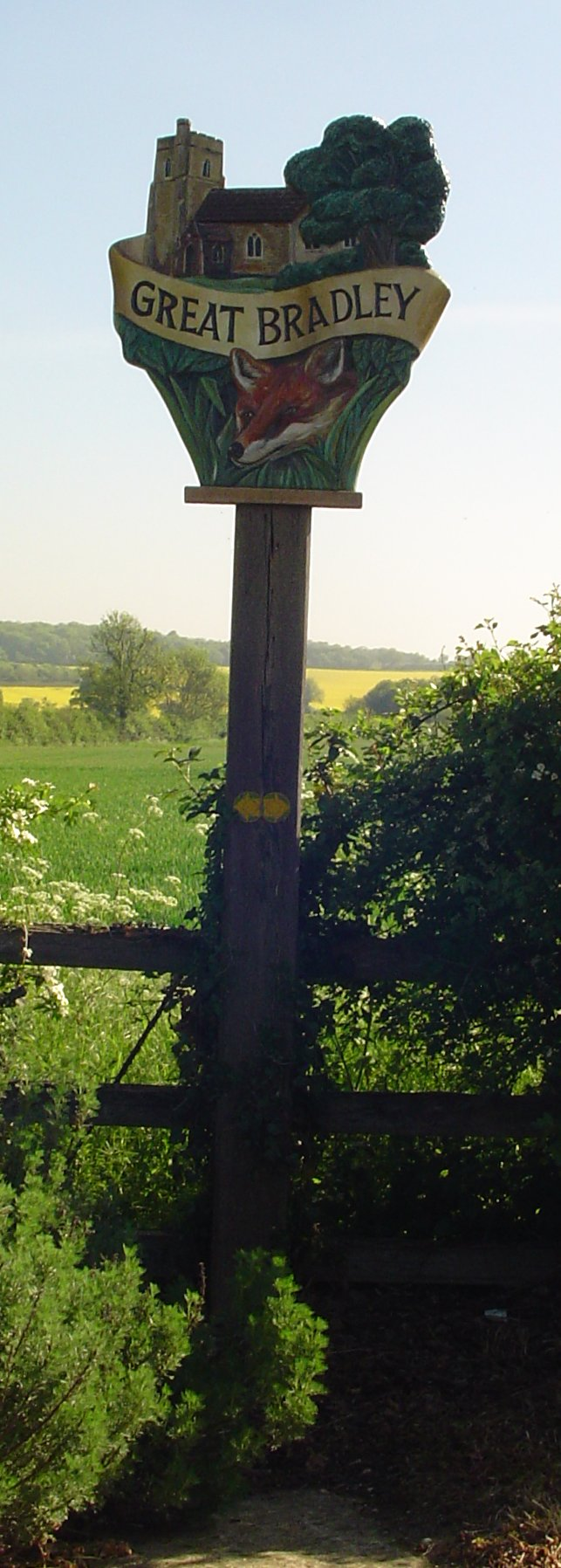
Village sign in Great Bradley

Great Bradley (also known as Bradley Magna) is a village and civil parish in the West Suffolk district of Suffolk in eastern England. According to Eilert Ekwall the meaning of the village name is the "wide clearing". The population is about 400 and includes Little Bradley.

== History ==
There is evidence that people have lived in and around Great Bradley by the River Stour since the Middle Stone Age over 5,000 years ago.

John Killingworth (d.1617) of Little Bradley (later of Pampisford, etc.) obtained a grant (or confirmation) of Arms on 25 November 1586. When his father Richard died in October 1586 he requested in his Will that "My body is to be buried in the parish church of Great Bradley. 10 shillings to the said church."

In the eighteenth century there was an annual fair held in the village on 29 September.
