= East Blean Woods =

Biological Site of Special Scientific Interest

Coordinates: 51°20.2′N 1°8.5′E

- Site of Special Scientific Interest
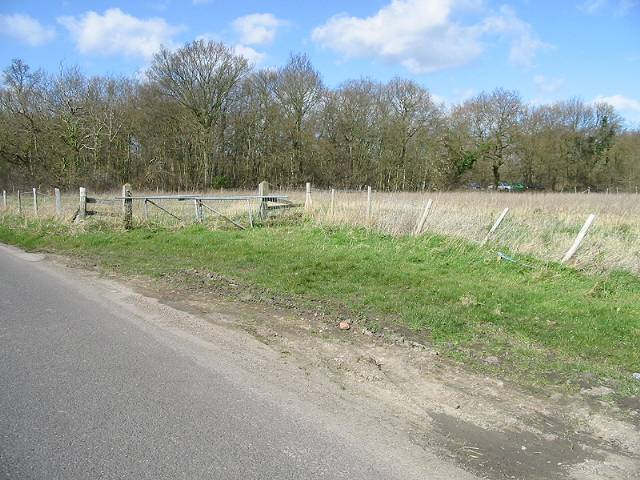
- Location of East Blean Woods.
- Area of search: Kent
- Grid reference: TR 188 642
- Interest: Biological
- Area: 151.4 hectares (374 acres)
- Notification date: 1985
- Location map: Magic Map

East Blean Woods is a 151.4-hectare (374-acre) biological Site of Special Scientific Interest south of Herne Bay in Kent. It is also a National Nature Reserve a Special Area of Conservation and a Nature Conservation Review site. An area of 122 hectares (300 acres) is managed by the Kent Wildlife Trust.

The reserve is ancient semi-natural woodland situated on poorly drained London clay, with a small area of gravelly soil in the south. The underlying clay results in much surface water and mud in winter and wet summers. The soil is mostly fairly acid, as shown by the carpets of bluebells and patches of heather (Calluna vulgaris), but more alkaline elsewhere, with characteristic species such as spurge-laurel (Daphne laureola), sanicle (Sanicula europaea) and common spotted orchid (Dactylorhiza fuchsii).

The wood has been heavily managed in the past as wood pasture and as a source for sweet chestnut (Castanea sativa) coppice. When conditions are open, after the coppice is cut, much of the ground is colonised by common cow-wheat (Melampyrum pratense), which is the food plant of the caterpillar of the rare heath fritillary (Melitaea athalia) butterfly. As the chestnut grows up again and the shade becomes denser, the habitat becomes unsuitable for the flowers and butterflies, therefore it is very important that regular coppicing is carried out to maintain open areas for our colony of one of Britain's rarest butterflies. The older coppice is, however, valuable for nesting birds such as warblers, and the maturing oak and wild service tree (Sorbus torminalis) stands attract many insects and birds such as woodpeckers, nuthatches and treecreepers.
