= Shelley, Suffolk =

Village in Suffolk, England

Coordinates: 52°N 0.95°E

Shelley
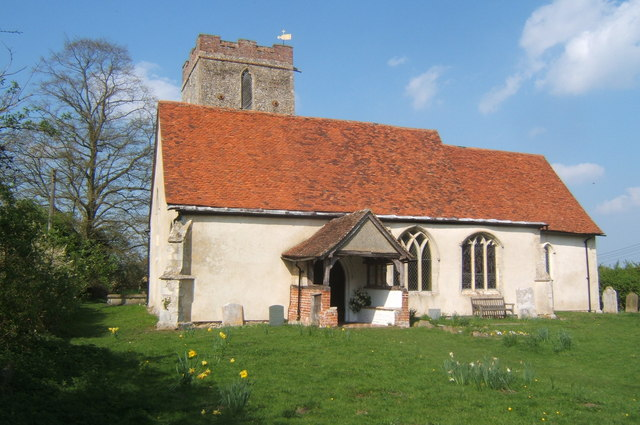
- All Saints' Church, Shelley

- Location within Suffolk
- Population: 50 (2005)
- Civil parish: Shelley
- District: Babergh
- Shire county: Suffolk
- Region: East
- Country: England
- Sovereign state: United Kingdom
- Post town: Ipswich
- Postcode district: IP7

Shelley is a village and civil parish in the Babergh district, in the county of Suffolk, England. Located on the west bank of the River Brett around three miles south of Hadleigh. In 2021 the parish had a population of 45.

Most of the parish is within the Dedham Vale Area of Outstanding Natural Beauty. Other points of interest are Shelley Hall, a listed building with a protected moat, once owned by the Partridge family, and Snakes Wood, which is classified as Ancient Woodland and serves as a nature reserve.

The village is first recorded before the Norman Conquest in the S1051 charter of 1000AD in the will of Ælfflæd. The Domesday Book of 1086 records the population of Shelley in 1086 to be 42 households along with 8 cattle, 32 pigs, 200 sheep, 3 other animals, 28 acres of meadow, 1,000 woodland pigs, two mills.

Barker writes that there is an unusually long hedge in Shelley made up of coppiced lime trees. He writes that this follows the boundaries of remnants of nineteenth-century clearances of some of the ancient forest. Hedges of this sort are known as assart hedges.

Elizabeth Gosnold Tilney, sister of Jamestown colonist and explorer Bartholomew Gosnold, is buried at All Saints' Church, Shelley. An attempt was made to use DNA from her supposed remains to confirm the identity of the body of her brother in Jamestown, but it was inconclusive as it could not be confirmed which body was hers.
