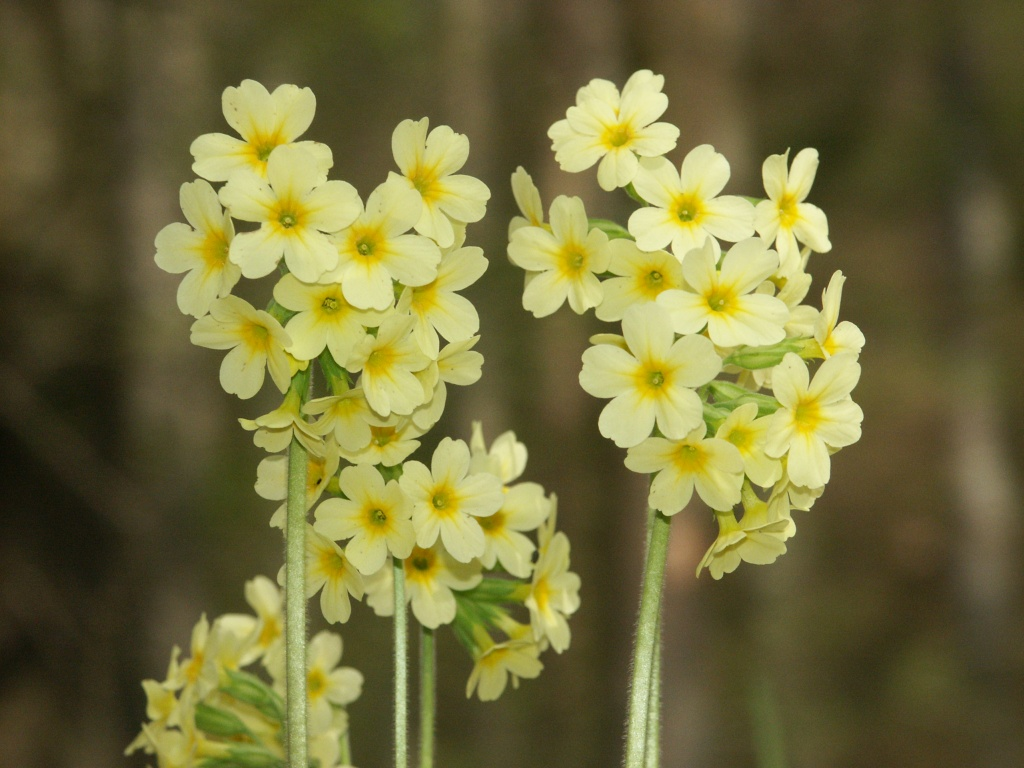

Scientific classification
- Kingdom: Plantae
- Clade: Embryophytes
- Clade: Tracheophytes
- Clade: Spermatophytes
- Clade: Angiosperms
- Clade: Eudicots
- Clade: Asterids
- Order: Ericales
- Family: Primulaceae
- Genus: Primula
- Species: P. elatior

Binomial name
- Primula elatior Hill, 1765

= Primula elatior =

Species of flowering plant

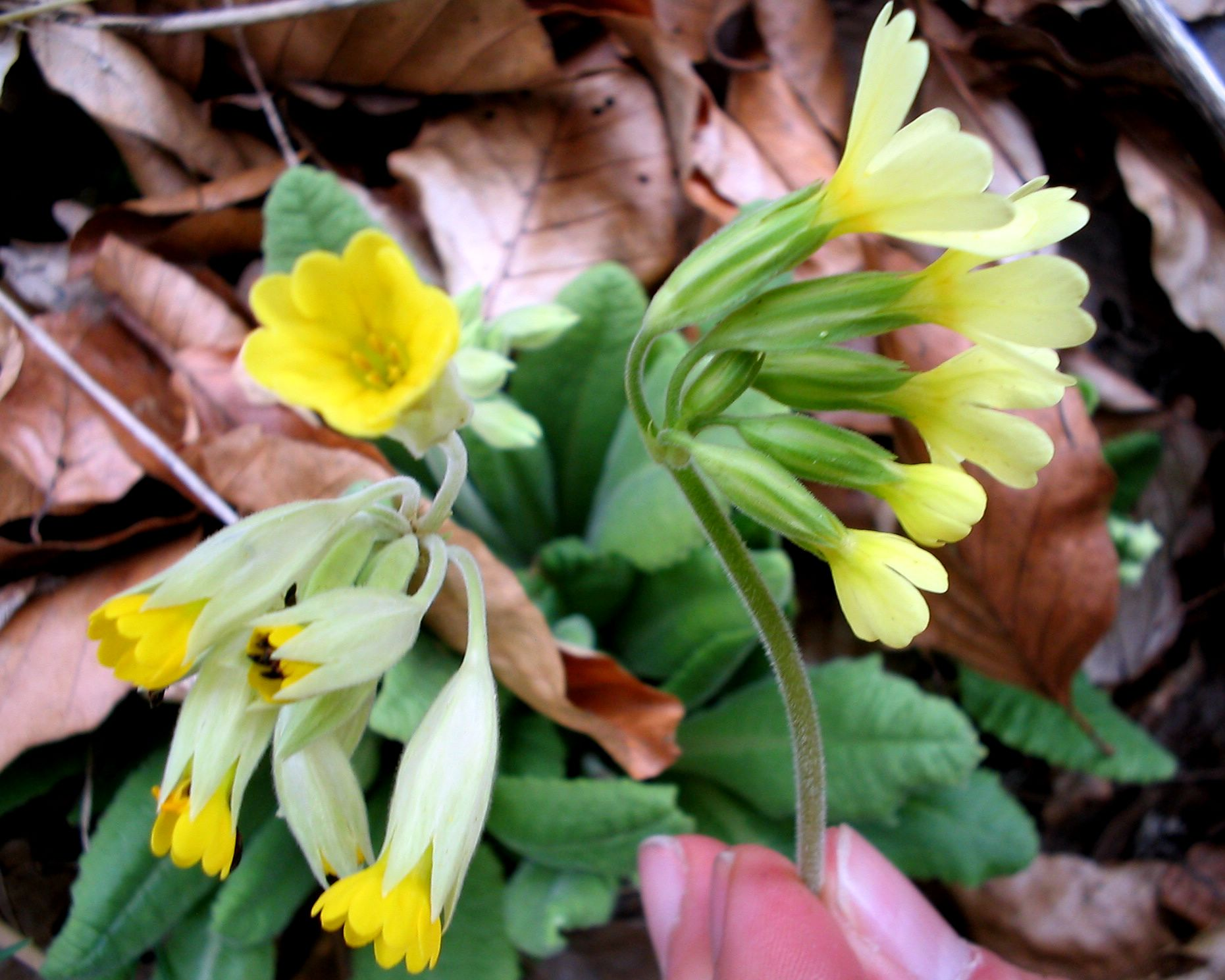
Comparison between flower heads of P. veris (left) and P. elatior (right)

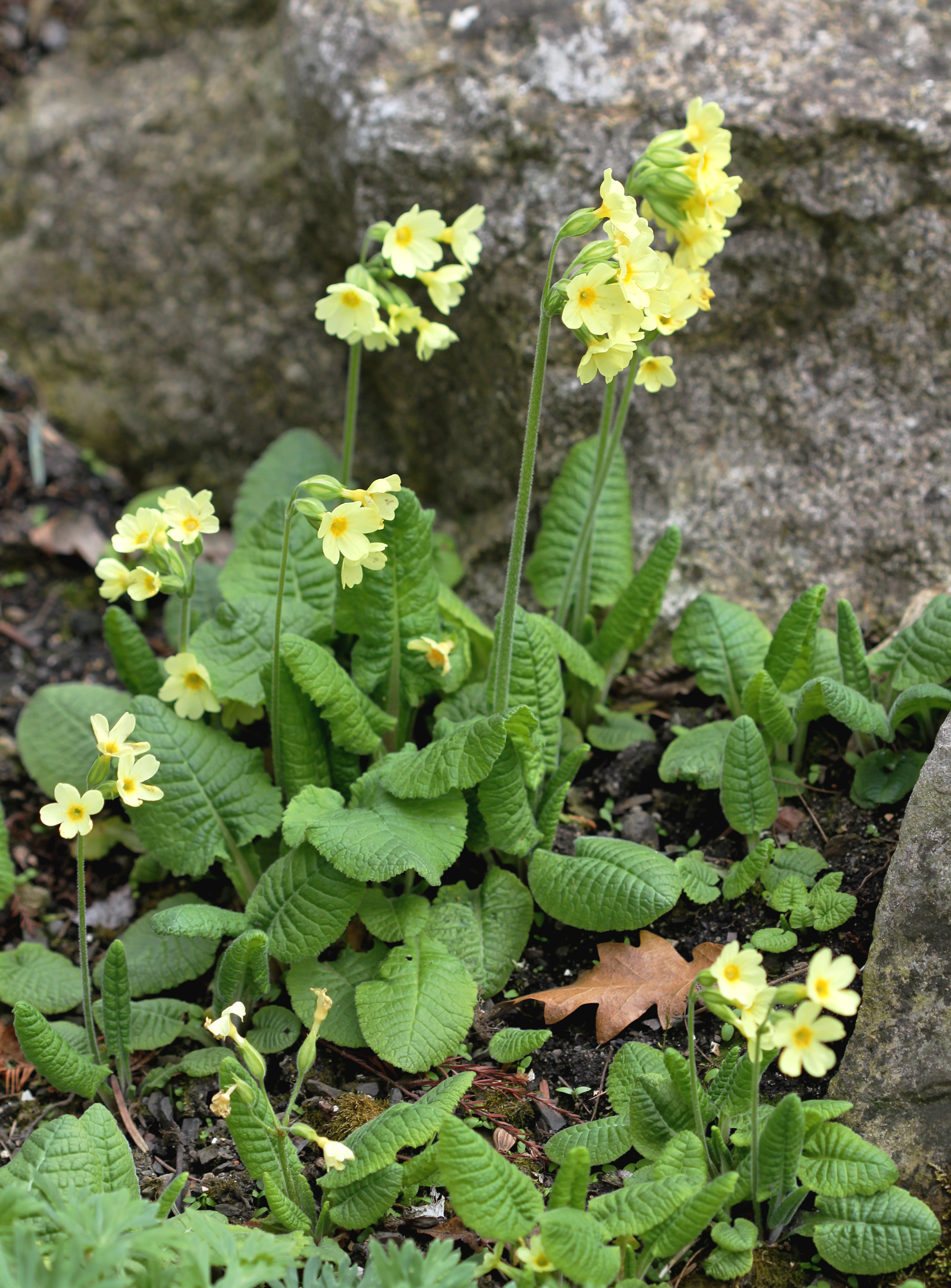

Primula elatior, the oxlip (or true oxlip), is a species of flowering plant in the family Primulaceae, native to nutrient-poor and calcium-rich damp woods and meadows throughout Europe, with northern borders in Denmark and southern parts of Sweden, eastwards to the Altai Mountains and on the Kola Peninsula in Russia, and westwards in the British Isles.

== Description ==
The oxlip is a herbaceous or semi-evergreen perennial plant growing to 30 cm (12 in) tall by 25 cm (10 in) broad, with a rosette of leaves 5–15 cm (2–6 in) long and 2–6 cm (0.8–2 in) broad. It produces light yellow flowers in spring, in clusters of 10-30 together on a single stem 10–30 cm (4–12 in) tall, each flower 9–15 mm (0.4–0.6 in) broad.

It may be confused with the closely related cowslip (Primula veris), which has a similar general appearance, although P. veris has smaller, bell-shaped, bright yellow flowers (and red dots inside the flower), and a corolla tube without folds. The leaves of P. veris are more spade-shaped than P. elatior.

== Names ==
The specific epithet elatior means "taller". The common name "oxlip", from "ox" and "slip", may refer to the fact that oxlips (and cowslips) are often found in a boggy pasture used by cattle.

== Cultivation ==
Primula elatior is cultivated as a garden plant. It may be used as bedding, grown from seed as a biennial, and discarded after flowering. It may be used in informal settings such as wildflower meadows. It prefers a sheltered position in full sun with moist soil. It has won the Royal Horticultural Society's Award of Garden Merit.

== County flower ==
The oxlip was voted the County flower of Suffolk in 2002 following a poll by the wild plant conservation charity Plantlife.
