= General aviation in the United Kingdom =

UK civil aviation (other than commercial air transport)

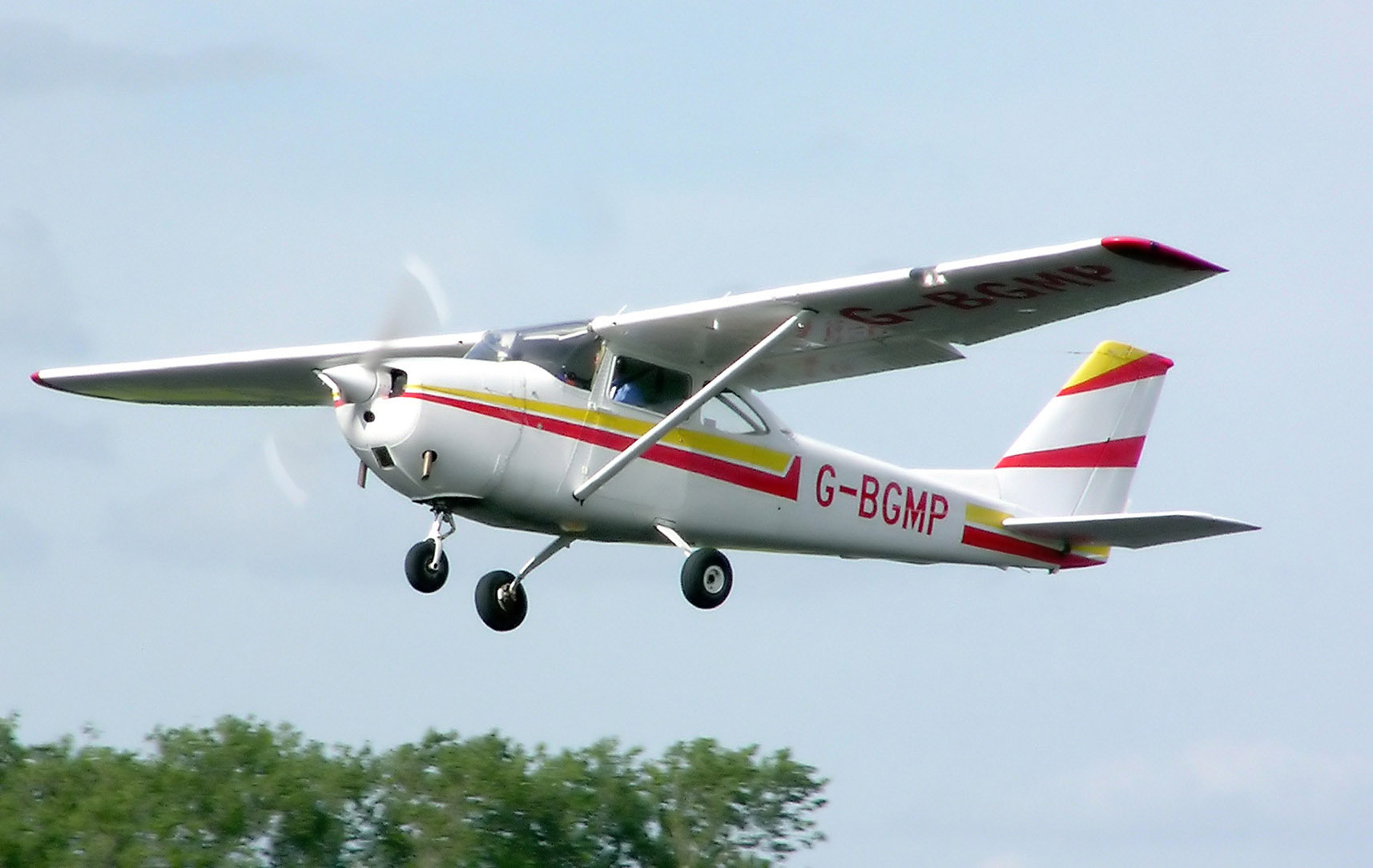
Traditional general aviation fixed-wing light aircraft, the most numerous class of aircraft in the sector

General aviation (GA) in the United Kingdom encompasses a variety of commercial and non-commercial aviation activities.

The sector operates business jets, rotorcraft, piston and jet-engine fixed-wing aircraft, gliders of all descriptions, and lighter-than-air craft. Corporate aviation and air taxi services account for nearly half of the economic contribution made by the sector. Other commercial GA activities are aerial work, such as surveying, air ambulances, and flight training, which plays an important role in the supply of pilots to the commercial air transport (CAT) industry. Private flying is conducted for personal transport and recreation. It includes a strong vintage aircraft movement, and encompasses a range of air sports, such as racing, aerobatics, and parachuting, at which British teams and individuals have succeeded in international competition.

Of the 21,000 civil aircraft registered in the UK, 96 per cent are engaged in GA operations, and annually the GA fleet accounts for between 1.25 and 1.35 million hours flown. The single most common class of aircraft is the fixed-wing light aircraft associated with traditional GA, but the main area of growth over the last 20 years has been in the use of more affordable aircraft, such as microlights, amateur built aeroplanes, and smaller helicopters. There are 28,000 Private Pilot Licence holders, and 10,000 certified glider pilots. Some of the 19,000 pilots who hold professional licences are also engaged in GA activities. Although GA operates from more than 1,800 aerodromes and landing sites, ranging in size from large regional airports to farm strips, over 80 per cent of GA activity is conducted at 134 of the larger aerodromes. The GA industry, which is around 7 per cent the size of the CAT industry, employs around 40,000 people, and contributes up to £4 billion to the UK economy.

GA is regulated by the Civil Aviation Authority (CAA). The main focus is on standards of airworthiness and pilot licensing, and the objective is to promote high standards of safety. At the lighter end of the GA spectrum some regulatory authority is devolved to representative bodies. Airspace regulation necessary to protect an increasing number of CAT operations has reduced the area in which GA flights can be freely conducted. The growth in CAT is also making access to larger airports more difficult for the GA sector, and smaller aerodromes are vulnerable to closure and re-development for more profitable uses. The UK planning system has no remit to consider the national significance of GA public transport operations, and generally does not favour the development of smaller aerodromes catering to the GA market. The planning process has become a mechanism for addressing local aerodrome-related environmental issues which, particularly regarding noise, are the main subjects of public criticism levelled at GA.

== Definitions ==
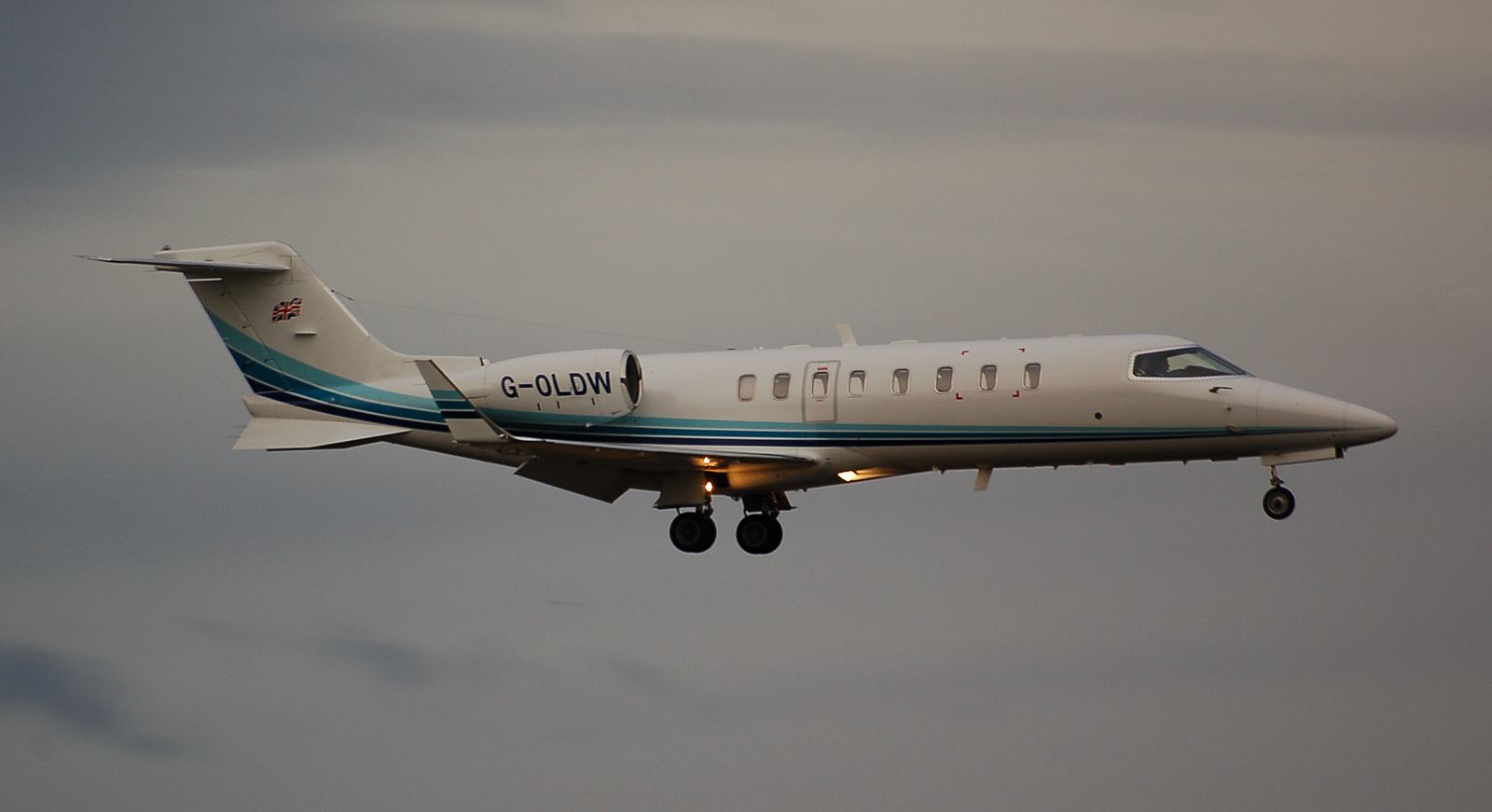
Business aviation is a commercial activity that is considered part of the GA sector.

The International Civil Aviation Organization (ICAO) defines general aviation (GA) as a civil aircraft operation other than a commercial air transport operation or an aerial work operation, however it includes aerial work within general aviation for statistical purposes. It defines commercial air transport (CAT) as "an aircraft operation involving the transport of passengers, cargo or mail for remuneration or hire", and aerial work as "an aircraft operation in which an aircraft is used for specialized services such as agriculture, construction, photography, surveying, observation and patrol, search and rescue, aerial advertisement, etc."

Organisations in the United Kingdom (UK) describe GA in less restrictive terms that include elements of commercial aviation. The British Business and General Aviation Association interprets it to be "all aeroplane and helicopter flying except that performed by the major airlines and the Armed Services". The General Aviation Awareness Council applies the description "all Civil Aviation operations other than scheduled air services and non-scheduled air transport operations for remuneration or hire". For the purposes of a strategic review of GA in the UK, the Civil Aviation Authority (CAA) defined the scope of GA as "a civil aircraft operation other than a commercial air transport flight operating to a schedule", and considered it necessary to depart from the ICAO definition and include aerial work and minor CAT operations.

== History ==
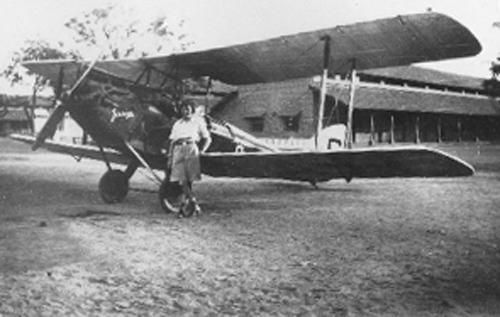
Amy Johnson and her de Havilland DH.60 Moth 'Jason'

The first aerodrome in the UK was established by the Aero Club at Muswell Manor on the Isle of Sheppey, and in May 1909 it was the venue of the first flight conducted in the country by a British pilot, John Moore-Brabazon. In 1910, the Aero Club was granted the Royal prefix, took responsibility for controlling all private flying in the UK, and started issuing the first British pilot licences. The introduction of the de Havilland DH.60 Moth in 1925 revolutionised light aviation, and the Royal Aero Club, recognising the "vital necessity of promoting civil flying", formed the Light Aeroplane Club scheme. Between 1925 and 1939, around 60 flying clubs were started, and more than 5,000 pilots were trained.

During World War II, civil aerodromes were taken over for military use, existing military airfields were expanded, and new ones were built. This resulted in a significant inventory of facilities becoming available after the war. Pre-war civil aerodromes, for example Sywell, were returned to civilian use. Surplus military airfields were closed, and in some cases, for example Beccles, subsequently re-opened as civil aerodromes. The Ministry of Civil Aviation was created to regulate all civil aviation in the UK, and this task remained the responsibility of government departments until the establishment of the independent CAA in 1972.

With an expanded infrastructure in place, GA became established after the war when manufacturers such as Cessna and Piper introduced light aircraft designed for the private market. The Cessna 172, developed from the late 1940s Cessna 170, was introduced in 1956, and became the world's best selling single-engine aeroplane. Single piston-engine aircraft are still the most common class of aircraft in the UK GA fleet. The development of the Rogallo wing in the 1950s fostered the development of hang-gliding during the 1960s and 1970s. The 1960s also saw experiments with motorised hang gliders, but it was not until the 1970s that this blend of technologies started to mature, resulting in the birth of the microlight movement. Another milestone in the development of GA was the 1964 introduction of the Learjet 23. Although it was not the first business jet, it popularised corporate aviation, and established the personal jet as a "whole new class of aircraft".

== Activities ==
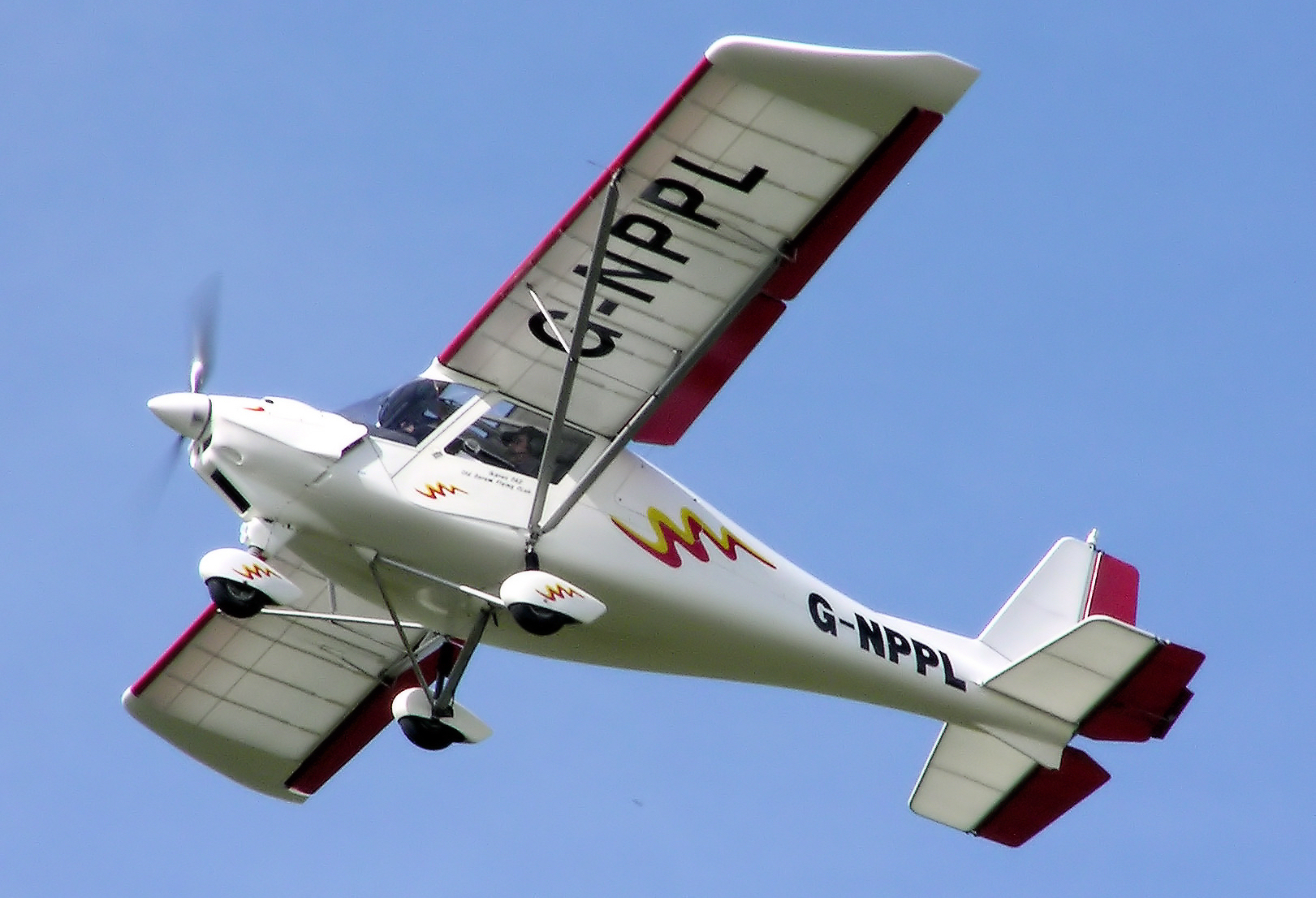
Ikarus C42 fixed-wing microlight

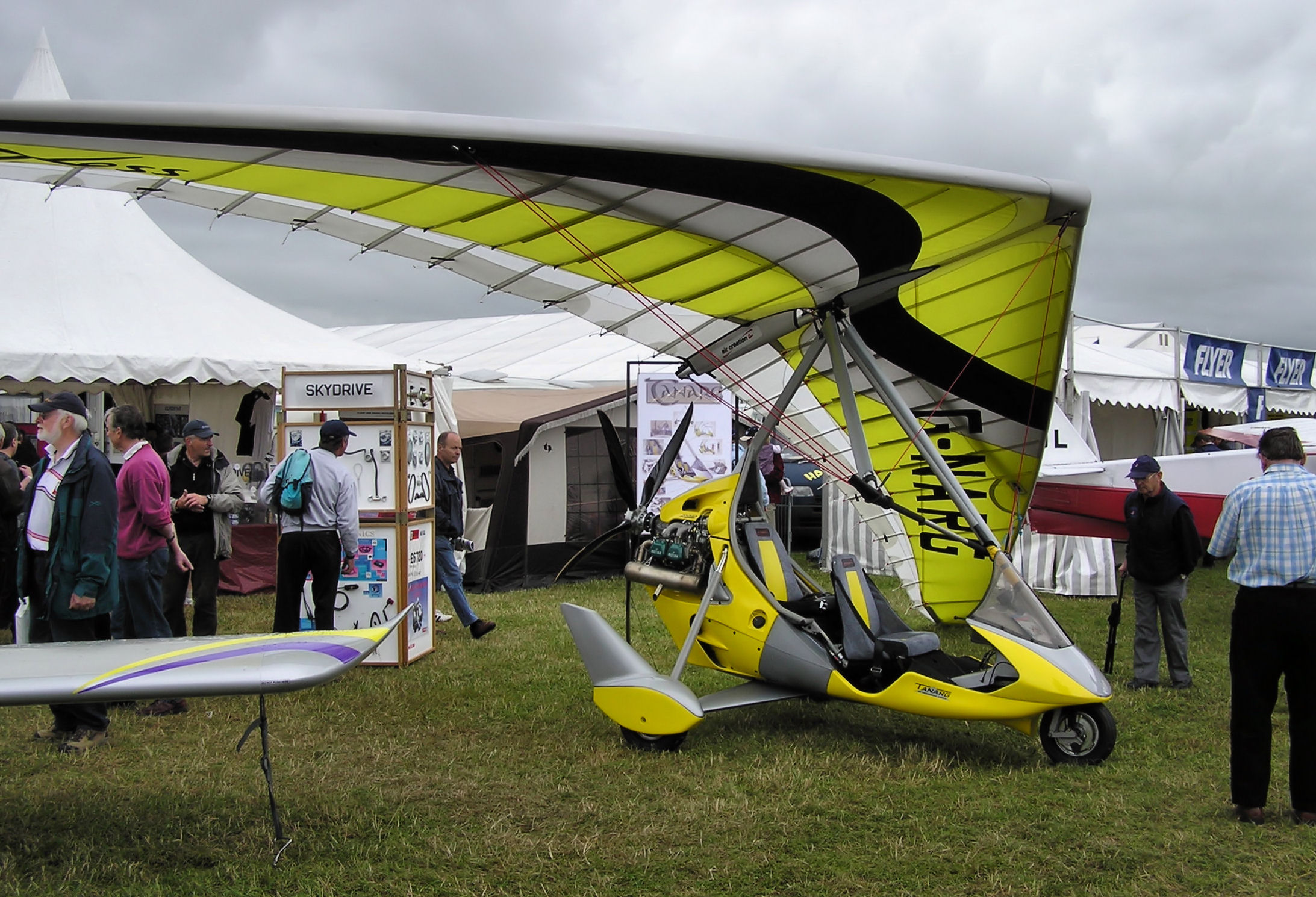
Air Creation Tanarg weight-shift microlight

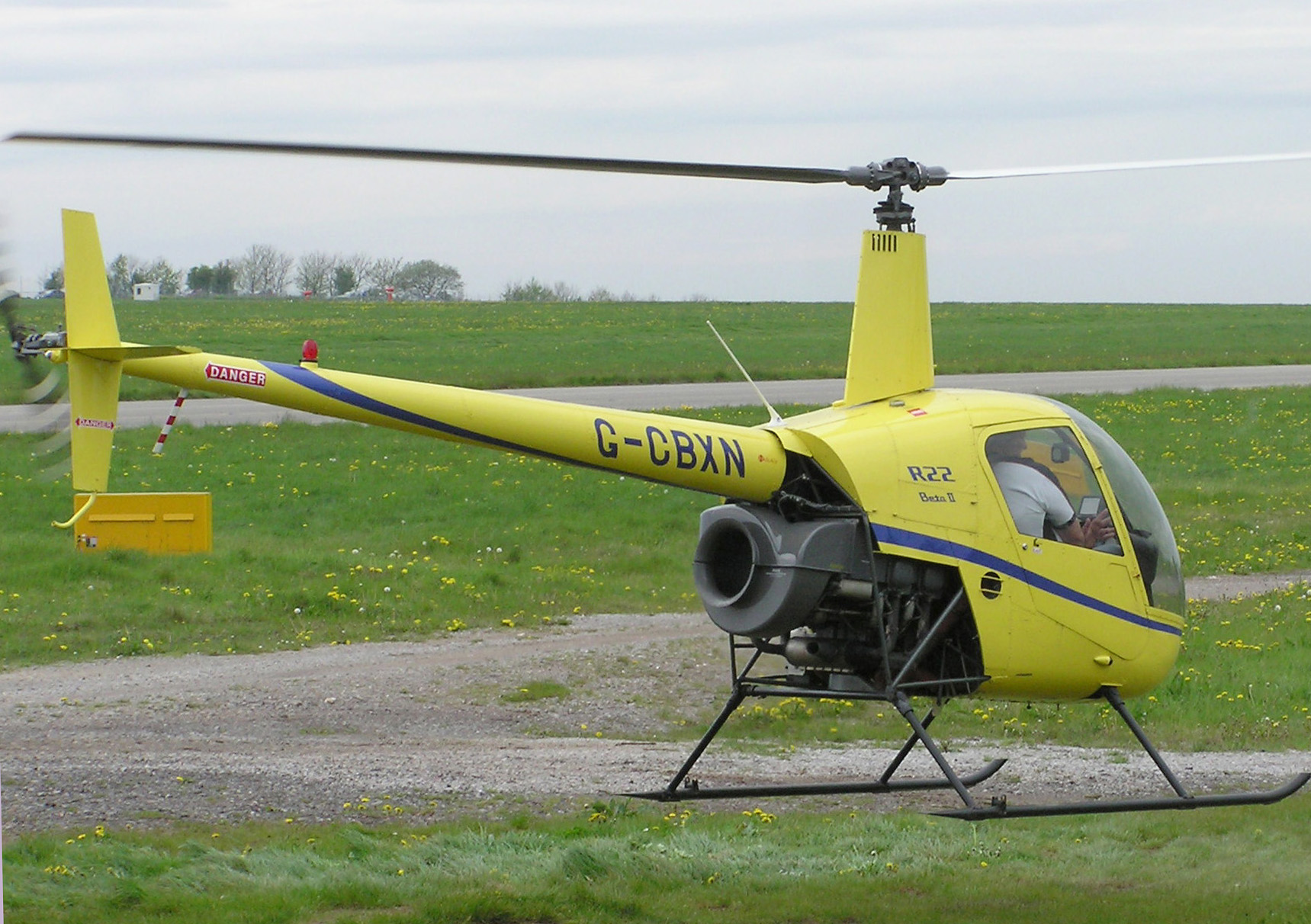
The development of the Robinson R22 has made recreational helicopter flying more affordable.

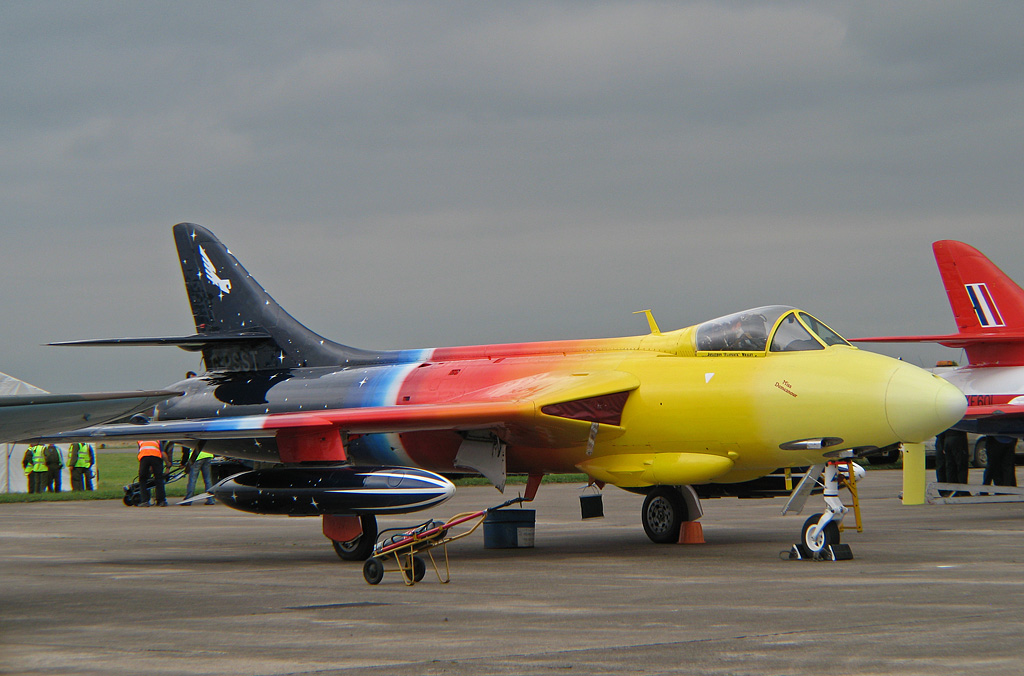
"Miss Demeanour" – privately owned Hawker Hunter

The GA sector operates a range of aircraft, including balloons and airships, gliders, hang gliders, paragliders, microlights, gyrocopters, helicopters, amateur built and mass-produced light aircraft, ex-military aircraft, and business jets. Flights can be broadly categorised as public transport, aerial work, and private flying, the first two of which are commercial activities.

=== Commercial operations ===
General aviation includes a variety of remunerated activities. Corporate aviation uses company-owned aircraft to transport employees and clients, and aircraft can be chartered for personal travel. Aircraft used in these operations include business jets, helicopters, and twin piston-engine aeroplanes carrying between six and ten people. An example of this type of operation is the transport by helicopter of spectators to the British Formula One grand prix at Silverstone. This involves so many flights that, according to Cranfield Aviation Services, on race day the heliport is temporarily the world's busiest airport. Aerial work is a small but important component of the commercial GA sector, characterised in its simplest form as remunerated non-transport activities, such as surveying, crop spraying, and emergency services work (air ambulance and police aviation).

=== Flying schools ===
Flying schools are commercial businesses engaged in the training of pilots, both for recreational purposes and for those intending to fly professionally. They make widespread use of fixed-wing light aircraft associated with traditional GA, not only for flying lessons but also as club aircraft rented out to qualified pilots for recreational flights. School-owned aircraft account for a significant amount of GA activity, both in terms of hours flown and aircraft movements. The pilot training element is regarded by the GA community as a key benefit that is critical to the supply of pilots for the airline industry. It is claimed by the General Aviation Awareness Council that 60–70 per cent of professional pilots have self-financed their flight training at GA schools, and one UK airline operator has stated that the industry must rely on 70–80 per cent of new pilots coming from the GA sector. The CAA estimates that between 1996 and 2006 the number of new professional pilots following the unsponsored training route rose from 48 per cent to 59 per cent. The counter argument to this claim is that pilots can be trained outside of the UK, and that the airline industry is not therefore dependent on a healthy GA sector in the UK for its supply of pilots. The CAA concludes that a severe reduction in GA would give "some merit to the argument that pilot recruitment would be threatened", but that the data on flying hours "does not support such a gloomy outlook." Of course, reliance on other countries for pilot training means that the UK foregoes the economic benefit of the training activity.

=== Private flying ===
Private flying can be for both recreational purposes and personal transport, using aircraft that are owned individually, collectively as part of a syndicate, or rented from a flying club. A survey of pilots conducted between 2001 and 2002 indicated that the most common purposes of recreational flights were local flights near the base aerodrome, visits to other aerodromes, and day trips away. Half of all flights landed at the same aerodrome they departed from, and only 9 per cent involved an overnight stay away from home.

Private flying is most associated with the traditional form of factory-produced two and four-seater, single piston-engine training and touring aircraft. Examples of these are the Cessna 152, Cessna 172, and Piper PA28 Cherokee, all with their origins in the 1950s, and the more modern designs of Cirrus. The average cost per hour to fly such aircraft has been estimated to be £133, compared to an estimated £77 per hour for gliders, and a reported £35 per hour for microlights. Recent trends have seen an increase in the use of microlights, and also in recreational helicopter flying following the introduction of smaller and cheaper machines such as the Robinson R22 and R44. Another growth area in private flying in recent years has been in the use of amateur built aircraft, such as the Van's Aircraft RV-4 and the Europa.

There is a strong vintage aircraft movement in the UK, with two-thirds of the 500 registered historic aircraft active. These cover the whole spectrum of civil and military aviation, examples being the de Havilland Dragon Rapide airliner of the 1930s, and the World War II Spitfire fighter. There are many post-World War II aircraft which could also be considered historic under a looser definition, including for example 60 ex-military jets such as the Hawker Hunter. Historic aircraft are regular exhibits at air displays, which are claimed to be the second most popular spectator activity after football in the UK.

=== Sports ===
Gliders at the 2004 Standard Class Nationals race

Competitive gliding in the UK takes place between May and September. Regionals are local competitions, organised and run by one of the bigger gliding clubs in the region, and represent the entry level to glider racing. Races are handicapped according to glider performance, and normally take place over nine days. Success in the regionals allows pilots to progress to the nationals, where there are five classes of competition. These are based on glider performance, the lowest being club class, and then progressing through standard (maximum 15 metres (49 ft) wingspan, and flaps not permitted), 15 metres (49 ft) (as standard, but flaps are permitted), 18 metres (59 ft) (maximum 18 metres (59 ft) wingspan), and finally open-class (no restrictions). Success at national level can lead to a place in the national team and competition at international level. In 2007 the British gliding team was ranked number one, and British pilots took two women's world championships and the open class European championship.

Handicapped air racing is open to any propeller-driven aircraft capable of maintaining a minimum speed of 100 miles (160 km) per hour in level flight. Races are a case of "fly low, fly fast, turn left", consisting of 4–5 laps round a 20–25 mile (32–40 km) circuit. Faster aircraft are handicapped by starting after slower aircraft, the intention being that the race concludes with all aircraft diving for the finish line together. There are up to 16 races per year, conducted at airfields in the UK, France and the Channel Islands, for prizes that include the Schneider Trophy and King's Cup, and the season culminates with the British Air Racing and European Air Racing Championships.

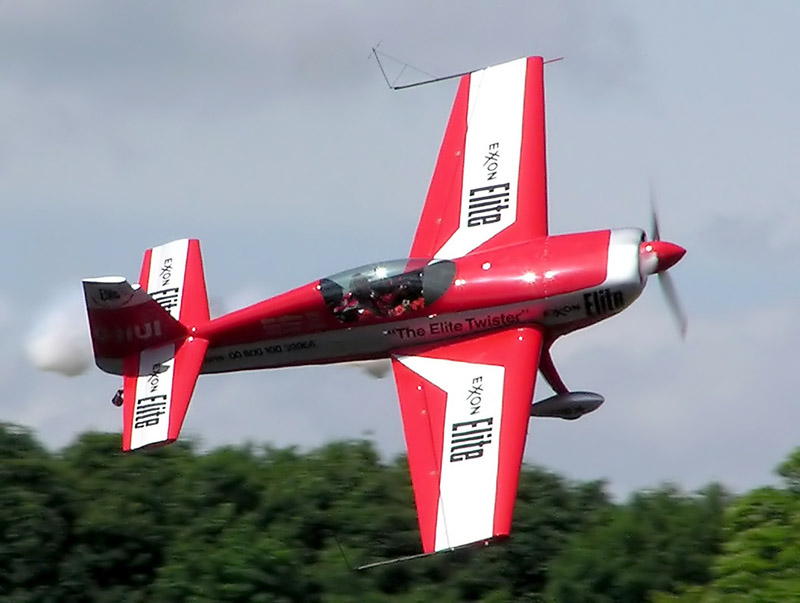
Extra 300 Unlimited class aerobatic aircraft

Aerobatic competitions take place for both powered aircraft and gliders, with up to 30 events each year in the UK and Ireland. Starting at the Beginner level, pilots can move up to Standard (powered aircraft) or Sports (glider) levels, and then on to Intermediate, Advanced, and finally Unlimited classes. Each step up requires a wider repertoire of aerobatic figures and progressively more performance from the aircraft. National championships are awarded annually at Standard/Sports, Intermediate, Advanced (powered aircraft only), and Unlimited levels, and pilots who have reached Advanced and Unlimited levels are eligible for selection to represent the UK in international competition.

Parachute competitions are held at club, regional, national and international levels, and include the disciplines of accuracy landings, freefall gymnastics, formation skydiving, canopy formation, freestyle and freeflying, and skysurfing. British teams consistently win medals in canopy formation world championships, and a British team took the 2006 world championship in women's 4-way formation skydiving.

== Aerodromes ==
Aerodrome is a collective term for any location from which flying operations take place, although more specific terminology can be used to characterise its purpose. The CAA strategic review of GA applies the term airport to locations which predominantly support large scale commercial operations, and airfield to locations which predominantly support GA operations. The General Aviation Small Aerodrome Research Study (GASAR) analysed 687 aerodromes in England which come under the scope of GA, classifying 374 into six types. These range in size from regional airports to the smallest farm strip, although 84 per cent of GA flights operate from 134 of the larger aerodromes in the first four categories.

=== GASAR aerodrome classification ===
The factors used in determining how an individual aerodrome is categorised by the GASAR study are based broadly on size and facilities. The six types of aerodrome are described, in size order, as: regional airports (e.g. East Midlands); major GA airports (e.g. Oxford); developed GA airfields (e.g. Andrewsfield); basic GA airfields (e.g. Rufforth); developed airstrips (e.g. Tilstock); and basic airstrips (e.g. Chilbolton in Hampshire). The actual criteria used to categorise aerodromes were complex, using 28 different parameters, backed up with a peer review by experienced GA pilots.

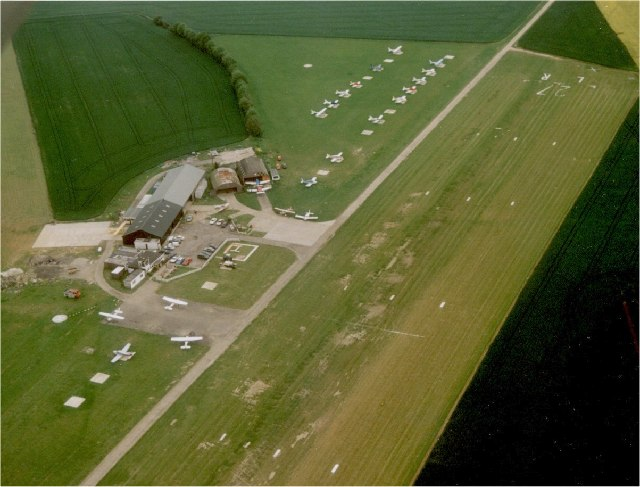
Andrewsfield – classified by GASAR as a developed GA airfield

Airports generally have long, fully lit, hard-surfaced runways, full air traffic control, and navigation and landing aids. They are usually located on urban fringes, support commercial and business operations, and often exclude certain types of light aircraft. At the more rurally located airfields, the lighter end of aviation, such as microlight and gliding activities, becomes increasingly prevalent, and there are few or no commercial operations other than flying schools. At this level runways are generally shorter, and grass surfaces are increasingly common. Navigation aids are increasingly scarce, being more basic where they are available, and informal ground to air radio communication replaces air traffic control. The smallest airfields are too small to feature on general purpose Ordnance Survey (OS) maps, and lack basic facilities such as fuel and maintenance. The majority of airstrips are basically single short grass runways with no supporting facilities, although the presence of a hangar is not uncommon at the larger examples. They do not feature on OS maps, and are owned by private clubs or, more commonly, individuals.

=== Aerodrome licensing ===
Most aerodromes used for public transport operations are required to be licensed by the CAA. To be granted a licence an aerodrome operator must satisfy the CAA that: the physical conditions at the aerodrome, and its environs, are acceptable; the scale of equipment, and facilities provided, are adequate for the flying activities which are expected to take place; an effective safety management system is in place; and that staff are competent and, where necessary, suitably qualified. Aerodromes classified as developed GA airfields or larger by the GASAR study are, with few exceptions, licensed. Only two basic GA airfields, Silverstone and Duxford, are licensed, and all airstrips are unlicensed. The Light Aviation Airports Study Group, a joint CAA-industry initiative, was established in 2005 to review the regulation of light aviation aerodromes. A particular focus of this group was a review of the restrictions placed on unlicensed aerodromes. The group concluded that the requirement for public transport operations to be conducted only from licensed aerodromes should be further reviewed in the context of corresponding international and European requirements. It also recommended that restrictions on flight training at unlicensed aerodromes should be lifted, and this was permitted from April 2010.

== Scale of the sector ==
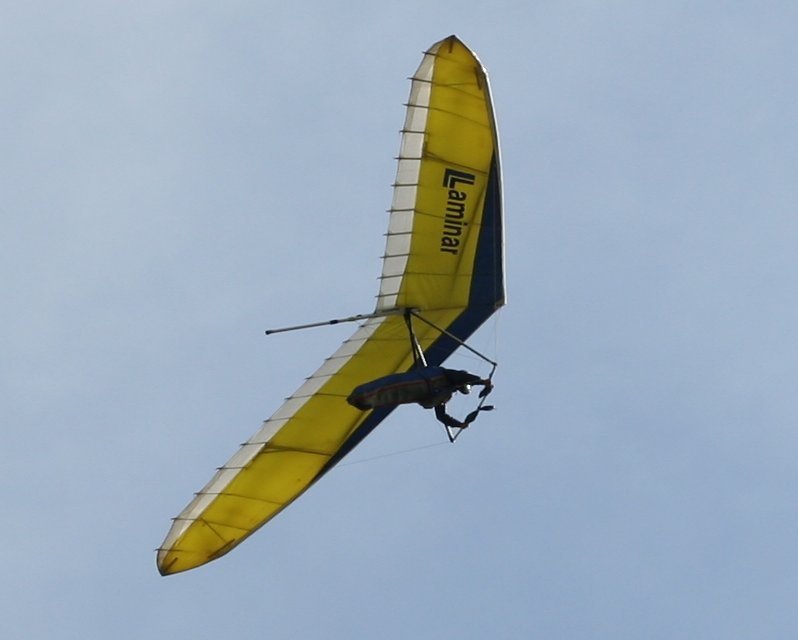
There were 7,000 hang gliders registered in the UK in 2005.

There are an estimated 27,000 civil aircraft registered in the UK, 96 per cent of which are engaged in GA activities. In 2005 the GA fleet comprised 9,000 fixed-wing aircraft, 4,100 microlights, 1,300 helicopters, 1,800 airships/balloons, 2,500 gliders and some 7,000 hang gliders. Estimates put the number of foreign-registered GA aircraft based in the UK at 900.

The number of pilots licensed by the CAA to fly powered aircraft in 2005 was 47,000, of whom 28,000 held a Private Pilot Licence. The remainder held professional pilot licences, either a Commercial Pilot Licence or an Airline Transport Pilot Licence, although not all of these would be engaged in GA activities. In addition, there are 10,000 active glider pilots, and estimates put the membership of aviation-related sport and recreational associations at 36,000.

The number of aerodromes that support GA in the UK is difficult to establish with certainty. Pooleys 2008 United Kingdom Flight Guide lists 355, and the Airplan Flight Equipment UK VFR Flight Guide 2008 lists nearly 500. Lockyears Farm 'Strips' and Private Airfields Flight Guide lists more than 300 landing sites. The GASAR study estimates 1,100 formal flying sites in England alone, a figure which includes 400 sites known to planning authorities but not included in flight guides. It estimates another 759 informal sites known only to land owners, customs, and members of the enthusiast group Air-Britain.

The sector was estimated to employ nearly 12,000 people and directly contribute £1.4 billion to the UK economy in 2005, making it roughly seven per cent of the size of the CAT industry. Nearly half of the economic contribution was generated by business aviation.

== Trends ==
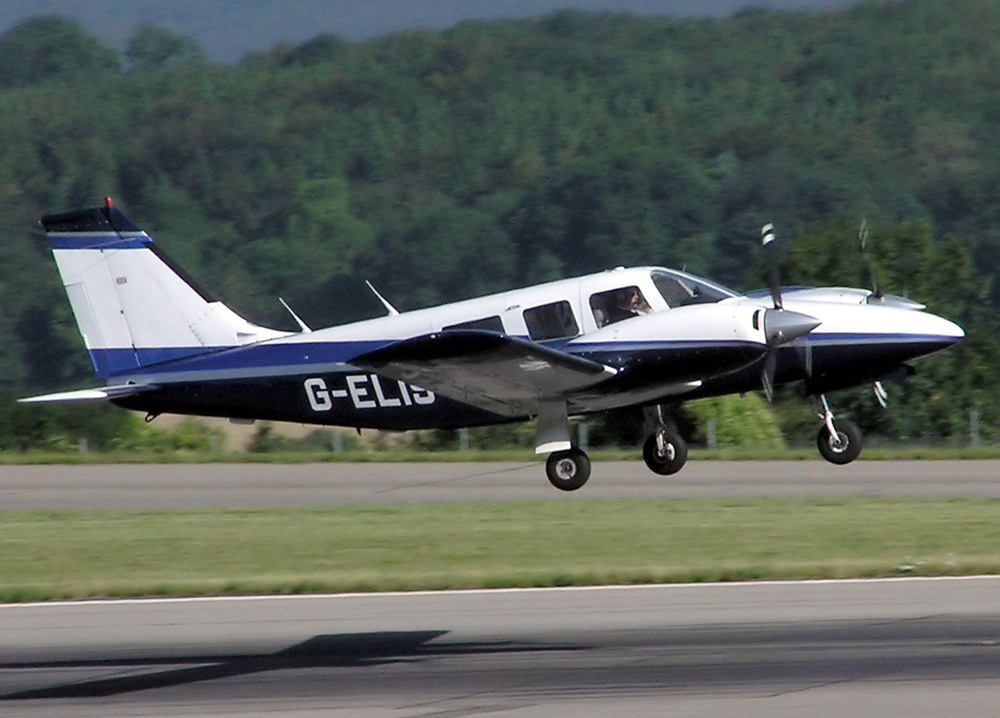
The number of registered twin piston-engined aircraft is on the decline.

Most sectors of GA for which data are available have experienced growth in aircraft numbers and hours flown over the last two decades. The lighter end of the GA spectrum: microlights, amateur built, and airships and balloons, have in particular shown strong growth, although the last of these activities was severely curtailed during the foot-and-mouth outbreak in 2001, when access to farmland was denied . After strong growth in the late 1980s, traditional flying has shown a slight decline recently, reflecting a move amongst recreational flyers towards microlight aircraft, and increased numbers of foreign-registered aircraft. Recreational helicopter usage has grown primarily due to the introduction of smaller and cheaper aircraft. Glider activity has remained relatively static, although there has been a gradual increase in the number of self-launching motor gliders.

Business aviation has shown strong growth, although the numbers of aircraft on the UK register have declined. This reflects a shift away from turboprop aircraft towards foreign-registered business jets based in the UK, which are estimated to be growing in numbers. However, twin piston-engined aircraft numbers have declined significantly, reflecting pressures on the light air-taxi segment from increasingly flexible and cheaper scheduled services, and a more sophisticated corporate charter business. The amount of flight training conducted by UK schools has declined, largely at the hands of competition from foreign schools, which benefit from lower costs and better weather.

Since 1990 the total number of hours flown annually by the GA sector has remained in the range 1.25–1.35 million, the dominant sector being traditional GA flying, which accounts for 0.6 million per year. An overall increase in aircraft numbers combined with nil growth in hours flown has brought the annual average utilisation per aircraft down from 157 hours in 1984 to 103 hours in 2002. The decline in asset utilisation has led to speculation that the economic health of the GA industry is weakening, though the lack of data on profitability makes this difficult to confirm.

== Regulation ==
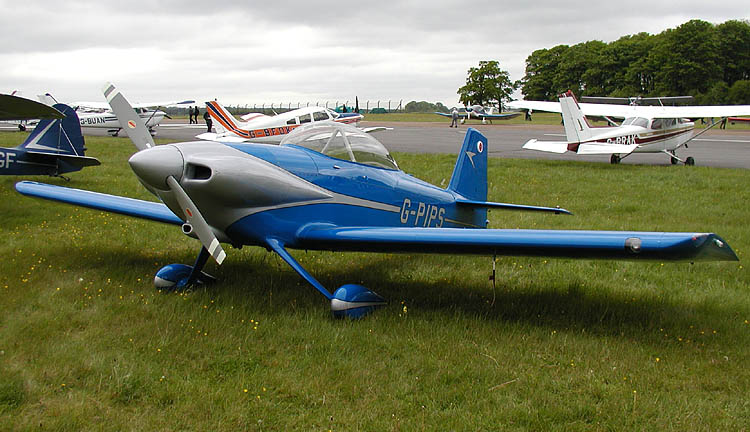
Van's Aircraft RV-4 amateur built aircraft

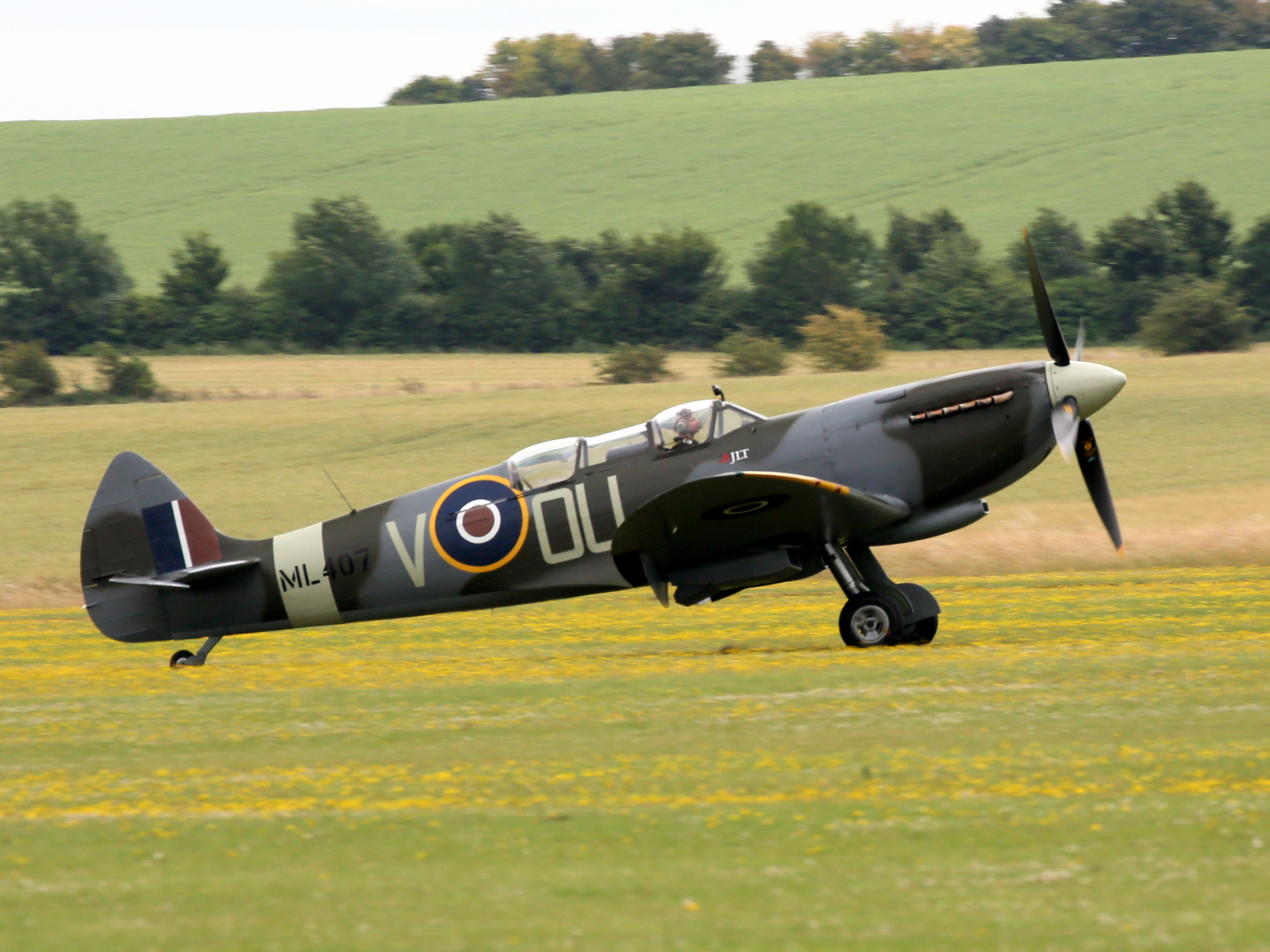
A British warbird – the Grace Spitfire

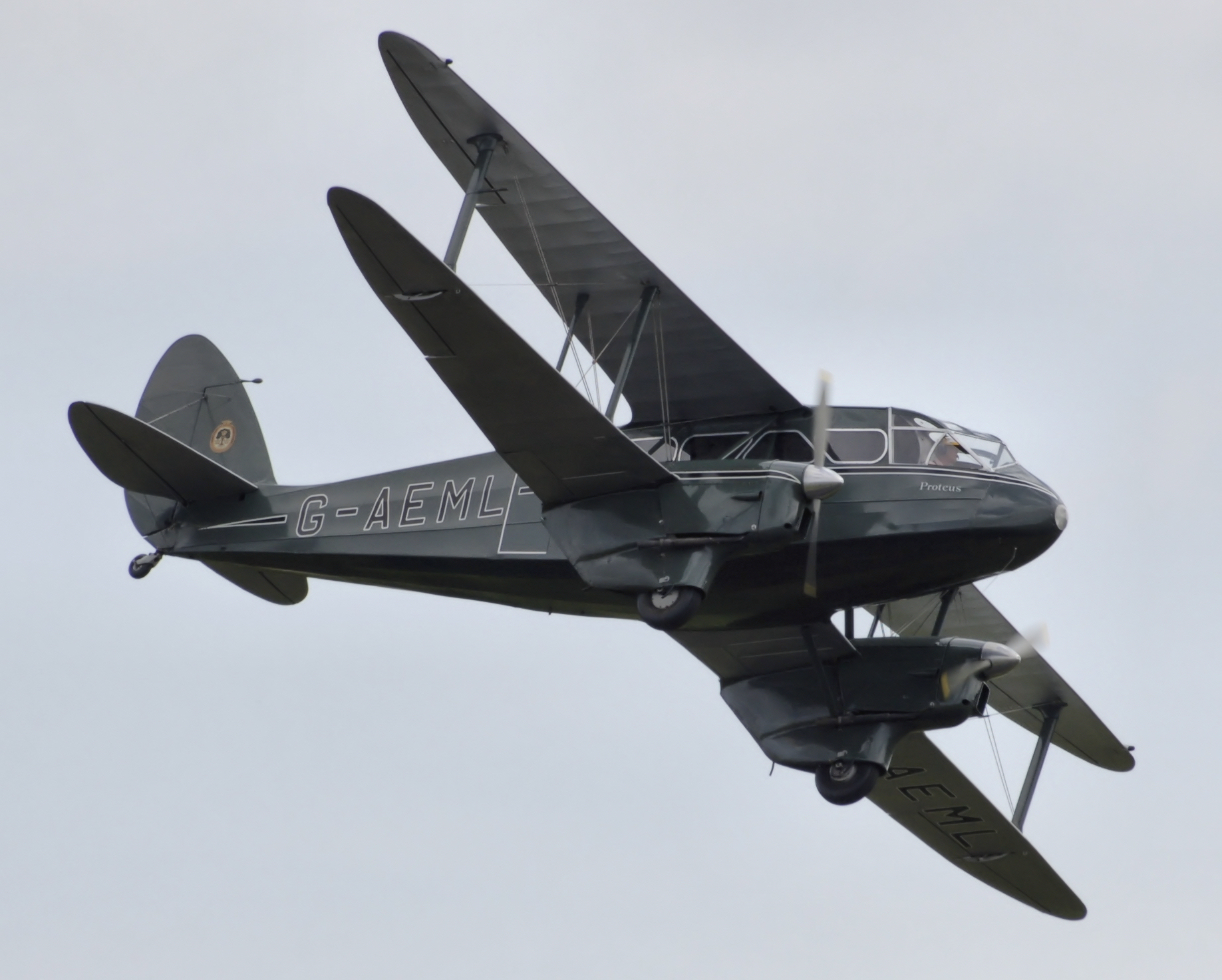
de Havilland Dragon Rapide vintage aircraft

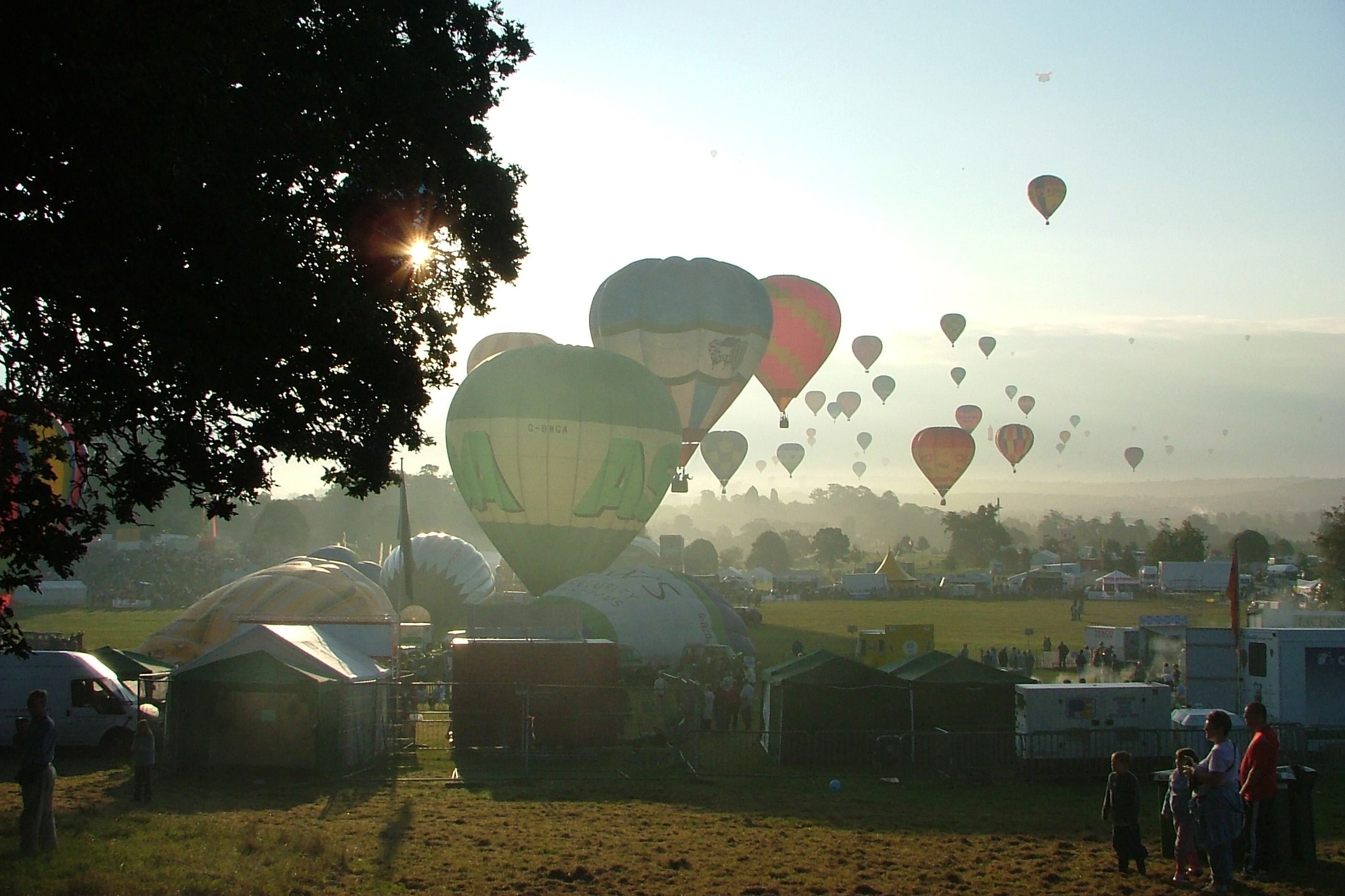
Mass balloon ascent at the Bristol International Balloon Fiesta

The objective of regulation is to "promote high standards of safety in all aspects of aviation", and this is the main area of interaction between the CAA and the GA sector. Efforts focus on assuring appropriate standards of airworthiness, pilot qualification, the rules for the movement of aircraft, and equipment to be carried. The CAA was established as the primary regulatory body for all aviation in the UK in 1972. In 1991 it started working within the Joint Aviation Authorities (JAA) framework to implement agreed common standards, known as the Joint Aviation Requirements (JAR), throughout the European Union (EU). In 2003 this was taken a step further when the European Aviation Safety Agency (EASA) was established as the central EU regulator, taking over responsibility for legislating airworthiness and environmental regulation from the national authorities. The CAA acts as an agency of EASA on these issues, retaining its original regulatory powers in areas not yet transferred to EASA. Proposed developments seek to establish EASA as the single authority throughout the EU, taking over from individual member states the power to regulate all aviation other than that specifically excluded from the scope of EASA.

=== Devolved and self-regulation ===
Within this framework certain sectors of GA are governed on a devolved basis. In all cases the CAA/EASA retains responsibility for safety regulation, but representative bodies, particularly of sectors that are not included in the scope of EASA, are granted greater oversight of their activities. The majority of microlight aircraft are regulated by the British Microlight Aircraft Association (BMAA), although a significant number are regulated by the Light Aircraft Association (LAA), formerly known as the Popular Flying Association. The LAA is the primary regulator for amateur built aircraft, as well as vintage and classic aircraft. Parachuting is governed by the British Parachute Association, although the aircraft used in this activity are generally CAA-regulated. Balloon and airship flying is overseen by the British Balloon and Airship Club. The UK-specific National Private Pilot Licence (NPPL) is administered by the National Pilots Licensing Group Ltd., supported by the LAA, the Aircraft Owners and Pilots Association UK, the British Gliding Association, and the British Microlight Aircraft Association. Separate from these devolved groups, gliding in the UK is self-regulated. The British Gliding Association was until recently responsible for glider airworthiness, now formally regulated as a result of EASA legislation, and still retains control of pilot certification. Hang gliding and paragliding activities (i.e. foot-launched gliders) are governed by the British Hang Gliding and Paragliding Association.

=== Airworthiness ===
Under CAA and EASA rules, all aircraft are required to meet certain standards of airworthiness to fly safely and legally. Aircraft that meet these standards are issued with a Certificate of Airworthiness. However, British-registered aircraft which are excluded from the scope of EASA, and which cannot satisfy the requirements for the issue of a Certificate of Airworthiness, may be issued with a Permit to Fly. This allows them to fly in UK airspace subject to certain limitations, for example being restricted to day-time flights under visual flight rules only. A number of organisations (e.g. the British Microlight Aircraft Association and the Light Aircraft Association) have obtained a standing over-flight permission for Permit to Fly aircraft within their area of interest with some European countries, notably France. Permits are typically issued to vintage and historic aircraft, amateur built aircraft, and microlights.

=== Pilot licensing ===
The pilot qualification most relevant to GA is the Private Pilot Licence (PPL), which permits the holder to fly for recreational purposes without remuneration. In addition to the European-wide Joint Aviation Regulations Flight Crew Licensing (JAR-FCL) standard, the CAA also issues UK-specific national licences. In the absence of European standards for gyroplane, balloon, and airship pilots, the CAA licences these according to the original UK PPL standard. As a response to the perception that JAR pilot licensing standards are excessively bureaucratic and expensive for the purposes of recreational pilots, the National Private Pilot Licence (NPPL) was introduced in 2002. The NPPL is easier to obtain than the JAR-FCL licence, has less stringent medical requirements, is more restrictive in the privileges it grants, and is valid only for flights in British-registered aircraft flying in UK and French airspace. Although there are plans to bring glider pilot licensing within the regulatory framework of EASA, the gliding sector is currently self-regulating in this respect. The British Gliding Association is responsible for defining the standards of initial training, and certifying, via a badge system, pilots who meet those standards. Pilots working in sectors of GA that are commercial operations, such as aerial work and business aviation, are required to hold a professional pilot licence which, at a minimum, is the Commercial Pilot Licence.

== Safety ==
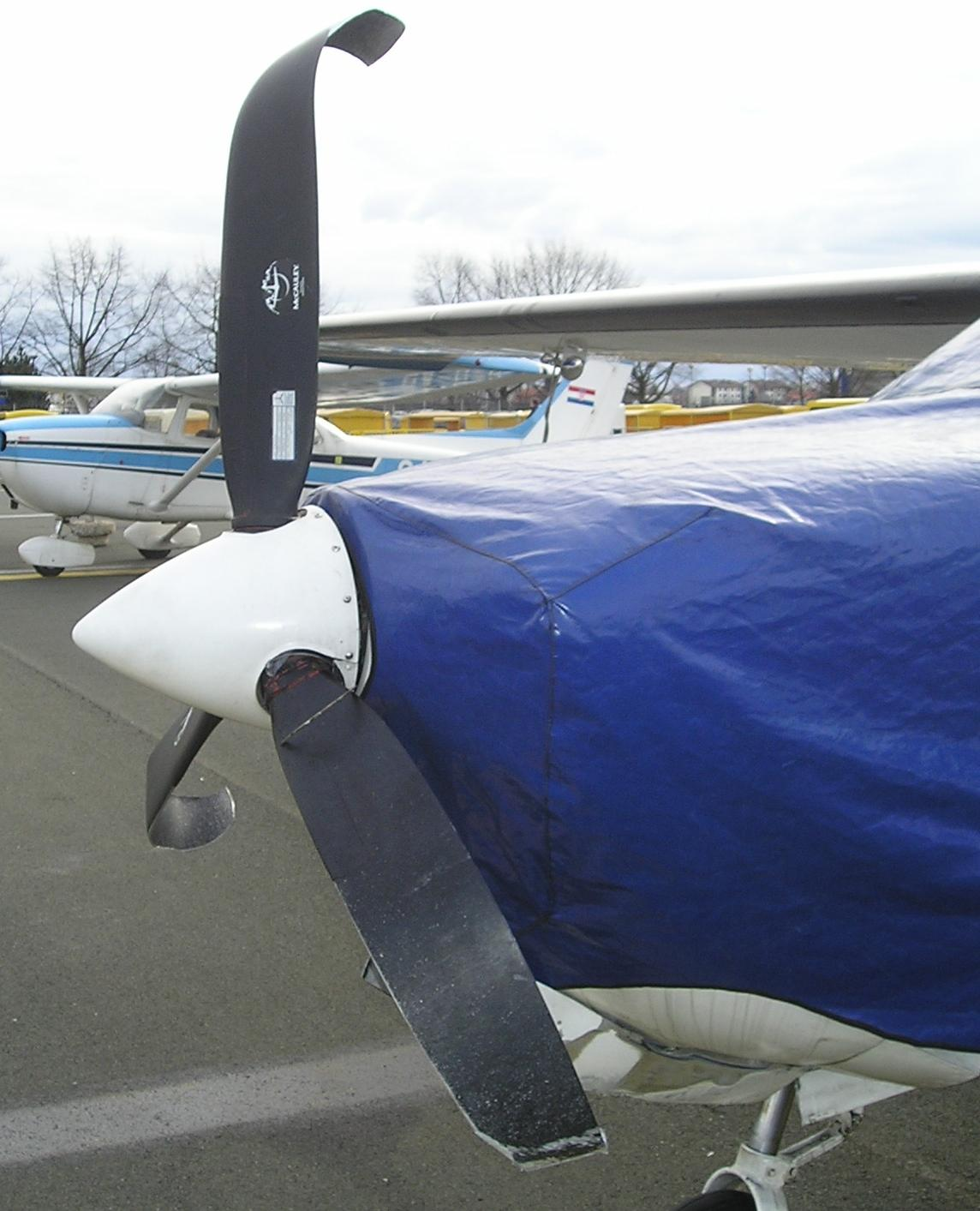

Between 1995 and 2004 there were 2,630 accidents involving GA aircraft, of which 139 were fatal, resulting in the loss of 317 lives. The majority of accidents involved small fixed-wing aircraft engaged in private flights, and analysis attributes the most common causes of these to: flight handling skills; poor judgement or airmanship; lack of training or experience; and omission of, or inappropriate, action.

Accident statistics 1995–2004
Type	Total accidents	Fatal accidents	Total fatalities
Aeroplane	1,622	107	196
Helicopter	246	31	71
Balloon	49	1	1
Airship	1	0	0
Glider	430	–	38
Gyroplane	31	–	8
Microlight	251	–	23
Totals	2,630	139	317

There were 27 fatal accidents involving GA aircraft in 2007, resulting in the loss of 48 lives. These compare with 16 accidents claiming a total of 19 lives the previous year, and although the 2007 statistics are higher than average, they are not exceptional.

== Issues ==
The growth in Commercial Air Transport (CAT) has eroded the operational freedom of GA, both in the air and on the ground at larger airports. Difficulty with access to larger airports is compounded by a decline in the number of aerodromes generally, and existing sites are often threatened with closure and re-development for more profitable uses. The UK planning system is designed to focus on local issues, and consideration of the national impact of GA operations is not within its remit. This makes aerodrome development difficult, often subjecting those that successfully negotiate the process to restrictions in use.

=== Airspace access ===
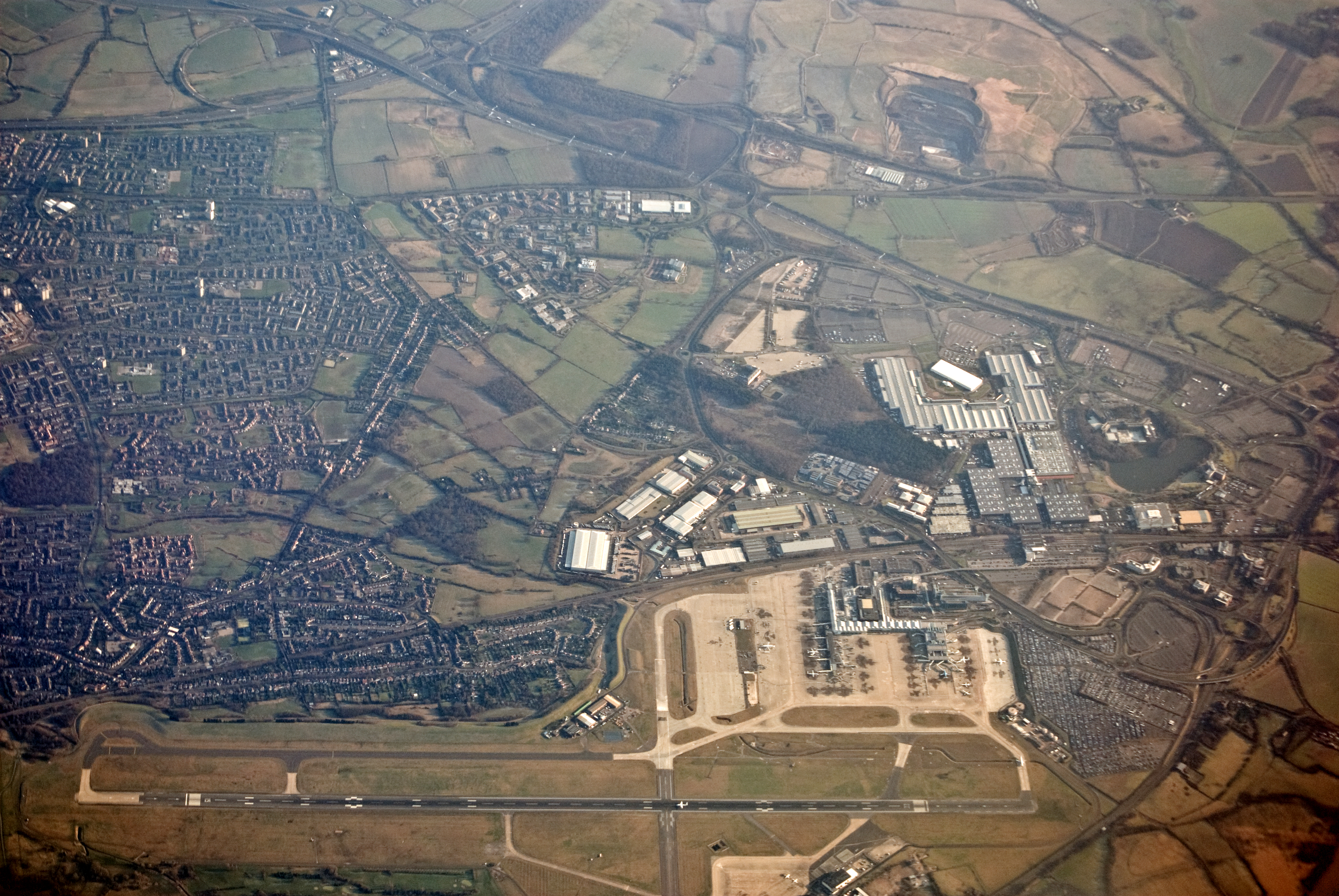
In controlled airspace above Birmingham Airport

Airspace is shared by CAT, military and GA users. It is divided into controlled airspace, in which aircraft must always be under the control of an air traffic controller, and uncontrolled airspace, in which aircraft can operate autonomously. Although GA flights can under certain conditions enter controlled airspace, they operate mainly outside of it.

Controlled airspace is essential for the provision of a known air traffic environment necessary for the safe operation of CAT. A CAA review found that "mixing [commercial] operations with other users is considered undesirable, even untenable" by commercial operators. However this position has resulted in extensive Class A controlled airspace with complex boundaries, including some running down to the ground, prohibiting VFR access to airspace resulting in high numbers of GA flights operating close to the borders of controlled airspace who could not get formal receipt of an air traffic service. Coupled with pilot navigation errors, hundreds of airspace infringements have been recorded every year.

Increases in the number of CAT operations, and in the number of airports they operate from, has resulted in a corresponding increase in Class A controlled airspace. Between 1997 and 2006 this area grew in size from 13 per cent of all airspace to 22 per cent nationally, and from 24 per cent to 43 per cent in airspace above England and Wales, leading to a perception within the GA community of being squeezed out. There are particular problems for GA around large airports, where Class A controlled airspace extends down to 2,500 ft. The concentration of commercial operations and high demand for GA in the South East of England have also resulted in extensive areas of Class A controlled airspace there, which serve to channel uncontrolled GA operations through high-collision-risk hot spots.

=== Aerodrome access ===
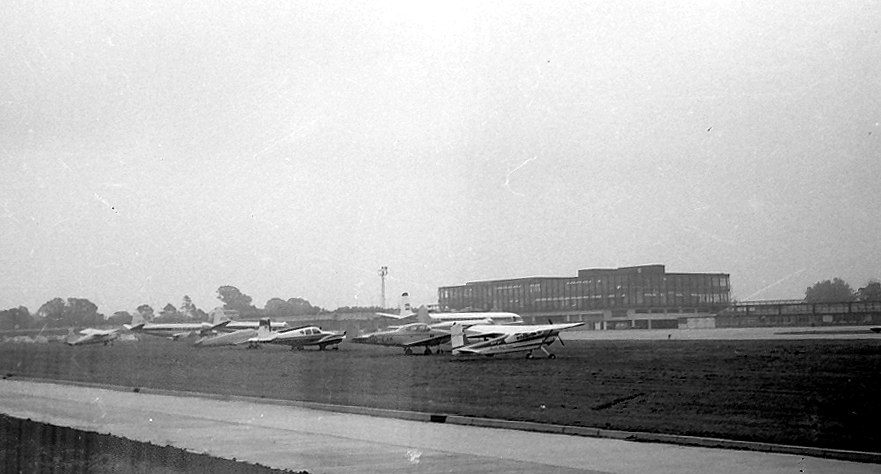
Light aircraft parked at London Gatwick Airport in 1961, before it became a CAT giant

Regional airports, such as Edinburgh Airport, have experienced strong growth in CAT operations in recent years. These operations are commercially and operationally incompatible with GA, and although there is no evidence of deliberate discrimination, the effect has been to discourage or exclude it. GA aircraft are being subject to significant increases in charges, including the imposition of handling fees in some cases. Some airports restrict or deny GA parking, and others limit or refuse certain GA activity. As a result, light GA aircraft are now rarely or never seen at large, busy international airports such as Heathrow, Stansted, Gatwick and Manchester.

In addition to this de facto loss of facilities, the number of aerodromes in the UK has been in decline over the last 50 years, as a result of increasing urbanisation and the closure of airfields built during World War II. Alternative and more profitable uses for land can also lead to existing aerodromes being threatened with closure, for example North Weald, or actually being closed, as happened to Ipswich Airport. and Bristol Filton Airport. Referring to the importance of a "functioning national network of GA airfields", especially where GA performs an air transport role, the CAA states that "there could be cause for concern if a significant further loss of airfields were to continue, especially if crucial nodes on the transport network were to be lost."

=== Planning system ===
The planning system is critical to the viability and operation of GA aerodromes. With many cities lacking scheduled air transport services between them, and with GA access to commercial airports becoming increasingly difficult and expensive, a viable network of aerodromes supporting GA air transport operations is regarded as an important national issue. However, there is no unified national planning policy specific to GA aerodromes, and planning decisions relating to these are based on local issues that are not required to consider the national impact. Because aircraft are excluded from noise control legislation, the only recourse for people affected by aircraft noise is through the planning process, and this issue is the principal factor on which the majority of planning decisions relating to GA land use are made. GA is a specialist subject often unfamiliar to Local Planning Authorities, and most planning decisions relating to GA either refuse permission, or grant it with restrictive conditions. Little Gransden is just one example of a GA airfield required to comply with planning restrictions on the number of movements permitted, thereby inhibiting further development. Such restrictions, if poorly conceived, can make GA operations unviable or even unsafe.

== Criticism ==
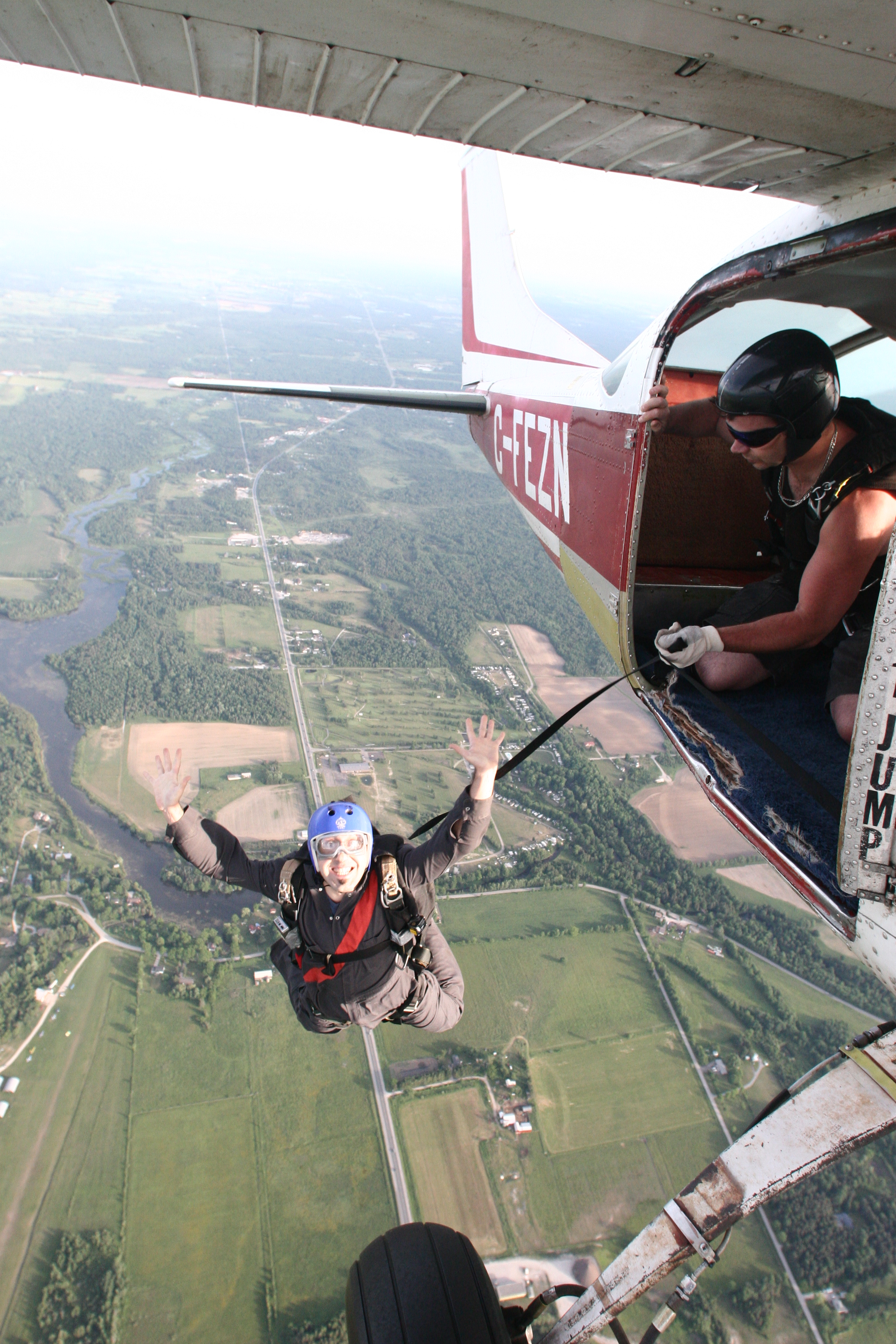
Parachute dropping is just one of the GA activities that generate noise complaints.

Public opinion towards aviation generally is worsening, based on increasing environmental concerns relating to emissions and noise, and private flying has been criticised by respondents to a government consultation on aircraft noise as a frivolous or selfish activity. In terms of environmental complaints and enquiries made to the CAA that relate specifically to GA, noise is "by far" the most common subject. Half of the 2,000 noise complaints made annually to the CAA concern GA operations, most of which relate to aerobatics, helicopters using private sites, air balloon incidents, parachute dropping, and alleged low flying.

Planning guidance on aircraft noise advises that "in some circumstances the public perceive general aircraft noise levels as more disturbing than similar levels around major airports." This is a result of the tonal characteristics of light aircraft engines and the activities they are engaged in, including: repetitive circuit flying at low-altitude near an aerodrome, during which aircraft are audible for long periods; slow climbing aircraft engaged in parachute drop or glider tug activities concentrated around the drop zone or aerodrome, also audible for long periods; erratic and repetitive engine noise from aircraft engaged in aerobatics; and piston-engines on full power in areas of low background noise, leading to the perception that such noise is more intrusive. In an attempt to alleviate these problems, the majority of aerodromes implement noise abatement procedures designed to route aircraft away from noise sensitive areas, and more than 50 are required by the government to provide consultative facilities in which local concerns can be raised with aerodrome operators.

== See also ==
- General aviation in Europe
- History of air traffic control in the United Kingdom
