= BMAA (disambiguation) =

BMAA is an abbreviation for the toxin beta-methylamino-L-alanine.

BMAA may also refer to

- Baptist Missionary Association of America
- British Microlight Aircraft Association
