= Little Gransden =

Village in Cambridgeshire, England

Coordinates: 52.180°N 0.140°W

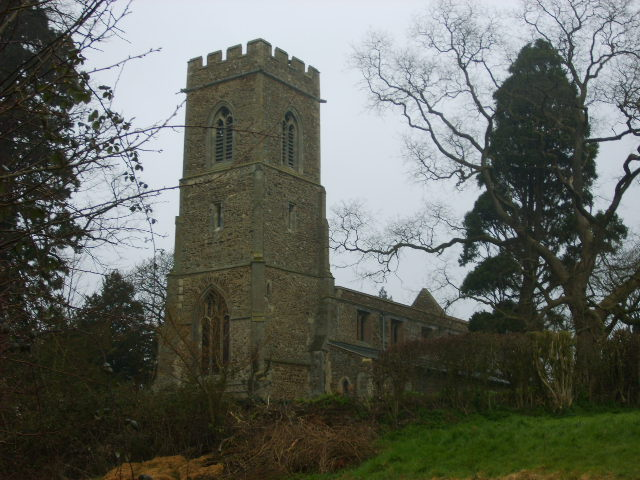
- St Peter & Paul Church, Little Gransden

- Location within Cambridgeshire
- Population: 296 (2011 Census)
- OS grid reference: TL272552
- Shire county: Cambridgeshire
- Region: East
- Country: England
- Sovereign state: United Kingdom
- Post town: SANDY
- Postcode district: SG19
- Dialling code: 01767

Little Gransden is a civil parish and village in South Cambridgeshire, England. In 2001 the population was 262 people, including Waresley and increasing to 296 at the 2011 Census. It is 11 miles (18 km) from Cambridge, on the border with the district of Huntingdonshire. Little Gransden has two airfields, one of which was used in World War II.

== History ==
The village's name is derived from 'valley of a man named Granta or Grante'. It was spelled Grantandene in 973 and Grante(s)dene in the 1086 Domesday Book.

Woodland was important in the settlement's early history; there was enough to support 60 pigs in 1086. By 1251, a large area of woodland in the south-east of the parish had been split into Hayley Wood and Littlehound Wood (the latter no longer exists, but the shape can still be seen in field boundaries).

Little Gransden village evolved as an offshoot of Great Gransden. The church and manor house of the abbey of Ely face Great Gransden across the low-lying land along Home Dole Brook; the village grew southwards from a street alongside the brook. There were 56 inhabited houses in 1666, but the number had dropped to 38 by 1801. By 1961 there were 84 houses.

Due to its isolated location, there were no inns in the village until 1800, though by the 1840s there were four (the Sun in Church Lane, the Chequers, the Double Chequers at Mill Hill and the Hardwicke Arms). In 1834, the overseer of the poor considered that an excess of beerhouses may have been partly responsible for recent problems. Only the Chequers was left after 1967.

Despite the heaviness of the soil, most of the parish land has been used mainly for arable farming. It was cultivated in three open fields until parliamentary inclosure in 1814. High, flat land in the east of the parish was hard to drain before mechanisation and was usually used for pasture and as the village common. In 1940, after the outbreak of World War II, the area was made into an airfield, called Gransden Lodge Airfield. It was in operational use from 1941 to 1946 but was unoccupied after 1948 and then sold off. Since October 1991 it has been the home of the Cambridge Gliding Centre.

== Governance ==
Little Gransden is represented on South Cambridgeshire District Council by one councillor for the Caldecote ward and on Cambridgeshire County Council by one councillor for the Gamlingay electoral division. It is in the parliamentary constituency of South Cambridgeshire, represented at the House of Commons by Anthony Browne.

== Geography ==
Little Gransden is 11 miles (18 km) from the county town of Cambridgeshire, 10 miles (16 km) south-east of Huntingdon and 47 miles (76 km) north of London. The village stands on the B1046 road between Abbotsley, to the west, and Longstowe, to the east. A minor road runs south-west to Gamlingay. The district council boundary, marked by the Home Dole Brook, separates Little from Great Gransden. The parish's northern boundary follows the line of a stopped-up road between Great Gransden and Longstowe, formerly called Deadwomen's Way after Deadwomen's Cross at the north-east corner of the parish.

The parish has an area of 1,920 acres (777 hectares) and ranges from 45 metres, along the Home Dole Brook, to more than 80 metres above sea level in the eastern part of Hayley Wood. The soil is light sand and heavy clay, with a subsoil of beds of stone and sand.

== Demography ==
At the time of the 2001 census, Little Gransden parish had 262 residents living in 99 households. 98.5% described themselves as White and 1.5% Asian or British Asian. 79.9% said they were Christian, 1.1% followed another religion and 18.9% had no religion or did not state one.

== Landmarks ==
The parish has two airfields: Little Gransden Airfield, located at Fuller's Hill Farm, which holds an air and car show every summer; and Gransden Lodge, a former Royal Air Force station which saw active service in World War II, but is now a gliding site, its three paved runways having been removed.

A cross in the churchyard commemorates Little Gransden men who were killed in World Wars I and II. There are 16 listed buildings in the village, including the Old Rectory, the parish church and various houses.

== Religious sites ==
The parish church, dedicated to Saints Peter and Paul, was built from stone in the 13th Century and comprises a chancel, a nave of four bays, and an embattled western tower containing three bells. In 1858 the chancel was restored and its east end rebuilt; a stained window was put in by the Rev. Alfred Newby, a former rector, in 1875. The church was restored between 1885 and 1888 at a cost of £700.

The parish had its own rector until 1928 when the living was merged with neighbouring Great Gransden. In 1999 the two parishes were merged with those Abbotsley and Waresley to form a united benefice that is now known as the Bluebell Benefice.
