= Waresley and Gransden Woods =

Ancient woodland in Cambridgeshire

Coordinates: 52.177°N 0.156°W

Waresley Wood
- Site of Special Scientific Interest
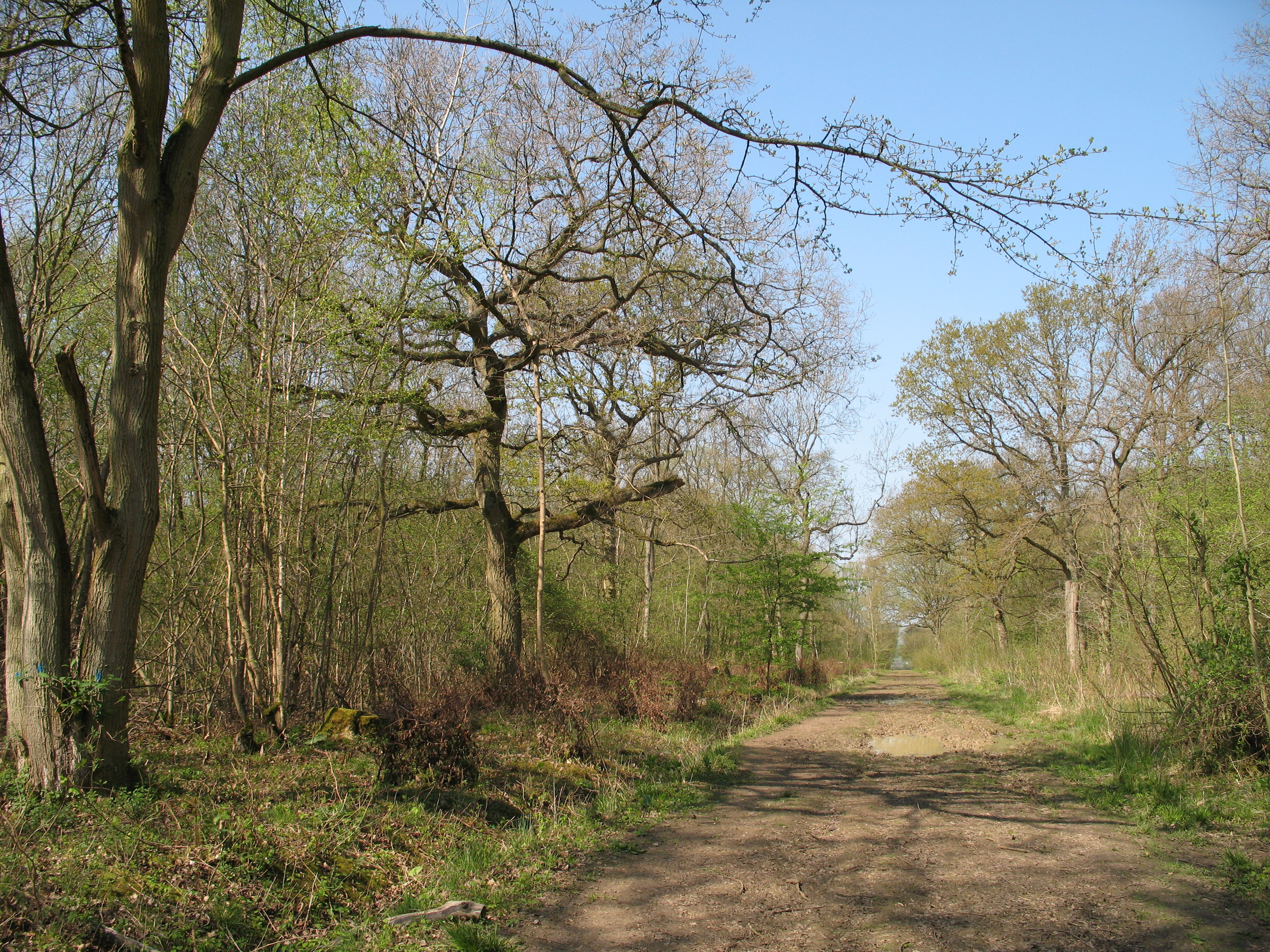
- Location of Waresley Wood.
- Area of search: Cambridgeshire
- Grid reference: TL 262 548
- Interest: Biological
- Area: 54.2 hectares
- Notification date: 1983
- Location map: Magic Map

Waresley and Gransden Woods is a 50-hectare (120-acre) nature reserve between Waresley and Great Gransden in Cambridgeshire, England. It is managed by the Wildlife Trust for Bedfordshire, Cambridgeshire and Northamptonshire. The site is a 54.2-hectare (134-acre) biological Site of Special Scientific Interest called Waresley Wood, with slightly different boundaries (but including Gransden Wood).

This ancient woodland is mainly ash, field maple and hazel. There are also rides with diverse flora such as the herbs bush vetch, meadowsweet, greater burnet-saxifrage and self-heal.

There is access by a path from Waresley Road.
