= The Chequers, Little Gransden =

Pub in Cambridgeshire, England

Coordinates: 52.180563°N 0.140168°W

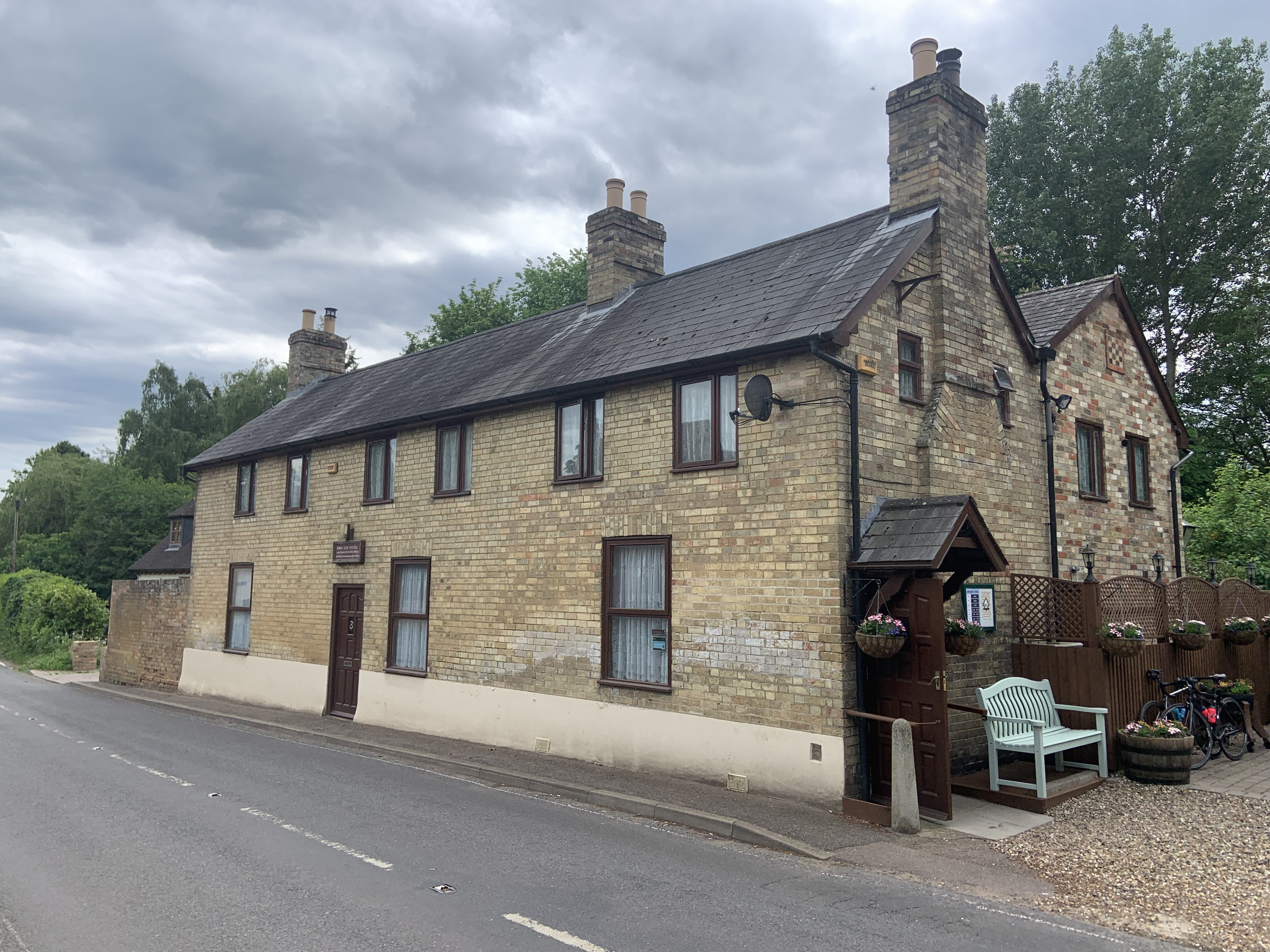

The Chequers is a pub in Little Gransden, Cambridgeshire. It has served the village since around 1764, and although Little Gransden had four pubs at one stage, it is now the only pub remaining. Over the years it has been owned by breweries including Phillips, Green's and Whitbread, before being bought by the family of the present landlord in 1970.

It has three small rooms, and the interior has remained essentially unchanged for over 40 years. It is on the Regional Inventory of Historic Pub Interiors for East Anglia. The pub is home to the Son of Sid brewery which was founded there in November 2007.
