= Waresley =

Village in Cambridgeshire, England

Coordinates: 52.175°N 0.173°W

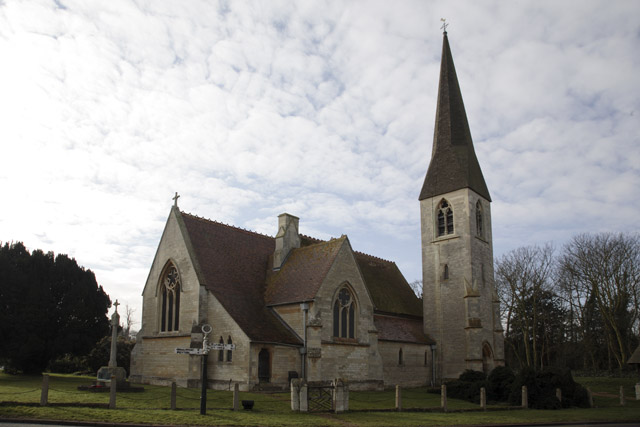
- Church, Waresley, Cambridgeshire

- Location within Cambridgeshire
- Population: 239 (2001 census)
- OS grid reference: TL253536
- Civil parish: Waresley-cum-Tetworth
- District: Huntingdonshire
- Shire county: Cambridgeshire
- Region: East
- Country: England
- Sovereign state: United Kingdom
- Post town: SANDY
- Postcode district: SG19
- Dialling code: 01767
- Police: Cambridgeshire
- Fire: Cambridgeshire
- Ambulance: East of England
- UK Parliament: Huntingdon

Waresley is a village and former civil parish, now in the parish of Waresley-cum-Tetworth, in Cambridgeshire, England. Waresley lies approximately 11 miles (18 km) south of Huntingdon and 5 miles (8 km) south-east of the town of St Neots. Waresley is situated within Huntingdonshire which is a non-metropolitan district of Cambridgeshire as well as being a historic county of England.

At the time of the 2001 census, the population of Waresley parish was 293. At the time of the 2011 Census the population was included in the Civil Parish of Little Gransden.

== History ==
In 1085 William the Conqueror ordered that a survey should be carried out across his kingdom to discover who owned which parts and what it was worth. The survey took place in 1086 and the results were recorded in what, since the 12th century, has become known as the Domesday Book. Starting with the king himself, for each landholder within a county there is a list of their estates or manors; and, for each manor, there is a summary of the resources of the manor, the amount of annual rent that was collected by the lord of the manor both in 1066 and in 1086, together with the taxable value.

Waresley was listed in the Domesday Book in the Hundred of Toseland in Huntingdonshire; the name of the settlement was written as Wederesle, Wedreslei and Wedresleie in the Domesday Book. In 1086 there were three manors at Waresley; the annual rent paid to the lords of the manors in 1066 had been £10.5 and the rent had fallen to £8.6 in 1086.

The Domesday Book does not explicitly detail the population of a place but it records that there were 28 households at Waresley. There is no consensus about the average size of a household at that time; estimates range from 3.5 to 5.0 people per household. Using these figures then an estimate of the population of Waresley in 1086 is that it was within the range of 98 and 140 people.

The Domesday Book uses a number of units of measure for areas of land that are now unfamiliar terms, such as hides and ploughlands. In different parts of the country, these were terms for the area of land that a team of eight oxen could plough in a single season and are equivalent to 120 acres (49 hectares); this was the amount of land that was considered to be sufficient to support a single family. By 1086, the hide had become a unit of tax assessment rather than an actual land area; a hide was the amount of land that could be assessed as £1 for tax purposes. The survey records that there were 8.5 ploughlands at Waresley in 1086 and that there was the capacity for a further six ploughlands. In addition to the arable land, there was 45 acres (18 hectares) of meadows and 21 acres (8 hectares) of woodland at Waresley.

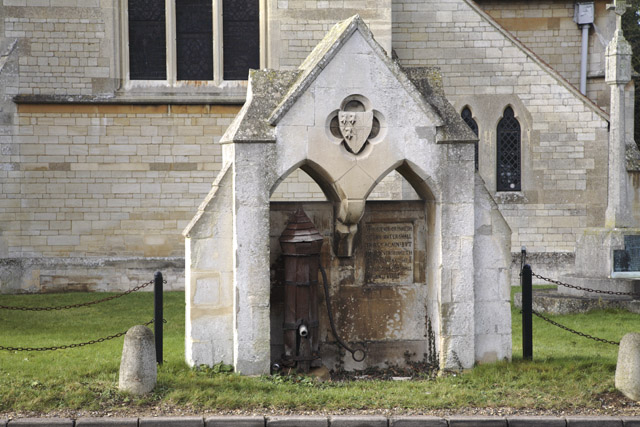
The village pump and drinking fountain was built in 1857

The tax assessment in the Domesday Book was known as geld or danegeld and was a type of land-tax based on the hide or ploughland. It was originally a way of collecting a tribute to pay off the Danes when they attacked England, and was only levied when necessary. Following the Norman Conquest, the geld was used to raise money for the King and to pay for continental wars; by 1130, the geld was being collected annually. Having determined the value of a manor's land and other assets, a tax of so many shillings and pence per pound of value would be levied on the land holder. While this was typically two shillings in the pound the amount did vary; for example, in 1084 it was as high as six shillings in the pound. For the manors at Waresley the total tax assessed was ten geld.

By 1086 there was already a church and a priest at Waresley.

The name Waresley probably means 'woodland clearing of a man called Wether or Wær. ' In 1801, Waresley's population stood at 195 people and in 1901, it was 216.

== Government ==
Waresley is part of the civil parish of Waresley-cum-Tetworth, which has a parish council. The parish council is elected by the residents of the parish who have registered on the electoral roll; the parish council is the lowest tier of government in England. A parish council is responsible for providing and maintaining a variety of local services including allotments and a cemetery; grass cutting and tree planting within public open spaces such as a village green or playing fields. The parish council reviews all planning applications that might affect the parish and makes recommendations to Huntingdonshire District Council, which is the local planning authority for the parish. The parish council also represents the views of the parish on issues such as local transport, policing and the environment. The parish council raises its own tax to pay for these services, known as the parish precept, which is collected as part of the Council Tax. The parish council consists of five parish councillors and a parish clerk. The parish council normally meets four times a year. The parish precept for the financial year ending 31 March 2015 was £4, 000. On 1 April 2010 the parish of Waresley was abolished to form "Waresley-cum-Tetworth".

Waresley was in the historic and administrative county of Huntingdonshire until 1965. From 1965, the village was part of the new administrative county of Huntingdon and Peterborough. Then in 1974, following the Local Government Act 1972, Waresley became a part of the county of Cambridgeshire.

The second tier of local government is Huntingdonshire District Council which is a non-metropolitan district of Cambridgeshire and has its headquarters in Huntingdon. Huntingdonshire District Council has 52 councillors representing 29 district wards. Huntingdonshire District Council collects the council tax, and provides services such as building regulations, local planning, environmental health, leisure and tourism. Waresley is a part of the district ward of Gransden and The Offords and is represented on the district council by two councillors. District councillors serve for four-year terms following elections to Huntingdonshire District Council.

For Waresley the highest tier of local government is Cambridgeshire County Council which has administration buildings in Cambridge. The county council provides county-wide services such as major road infrastructure, fire and rescue, education, social services, libraries and heritage services. Cambridgeshire County Council consists of 69 councillors representing 60 electoral divisions. Waresley is part of the electoral division of Buckden, Gransden and The Offords and is represented on the county council by one councillor.

At Westminster Waresley is in the parliamentary constituency of Huntingdon, and elects one Member of Parliament (MP) by the first past the post system of election. Waresley is represented in the House of Commons by Jonathan Djanogly (Conservative). Jonathan Djanogly has represented the constituency since 2001. The previous member of parliament was John Major (Conservative) who represented the constituency between 1983 and 2001.

== Geography ==
Waresley is on the B1040 road between Gamlingay and Eltisley, five miles south-east of the town of St Neots and seven miles north-east of Sandy, Bedfordshire, England. London is 45 miles south and Huntingdon 10 miles north.

== Demography ==
=== Population ===
In the period 1801 to 1901 the population of Waresley was recorded every ten years by the UK census. During this time the population was in the range of 180 (the lowest was in 1811) and 295 (the highest was in 1851).

From 1901, a census was taken every ten years with the exception of 1941 (due to the Second World War).

Parish	1911	1921	1931	1951	1961	1971	1981	1991	2001	2011
Waresley	192	183	167	170	183	202	249	217	231	

All population census figures from report Historic Census figures Cambridgeshire to 2011 by Cambridgeshire Insight.

== Landmarks ==
Waresley Wood, a Site of Special Scientific Interest, is managed as a nature reserve by the Wildlife Trust for Bedfordshire, Cambridgeshire and Northamptonshire. Waresley Park, a former deer park landscaped by the 18th Century designer Humphry Repton.

== Religious sites ==
Waresley has had three church buildings. The original church stood in the east of the village and was mentioned in the Domesday Book but was destroyed by a storm in 1724. In 1728, it was rebuilt but was pulled down and the current church built on a new site, at the junction of the roads to Great Gransden and Eltisley in 1856. It is dedicated to Saint James and was designed by William Butterfield. The church's spire blew down in a storm of March 1987, just missing a bus-stop full of school kids that had left minutes before it came down, but it was rebuilt by John Charlton, Paul Raffles and Chris Phillips of Waymans.
