= General aviation in Europe =

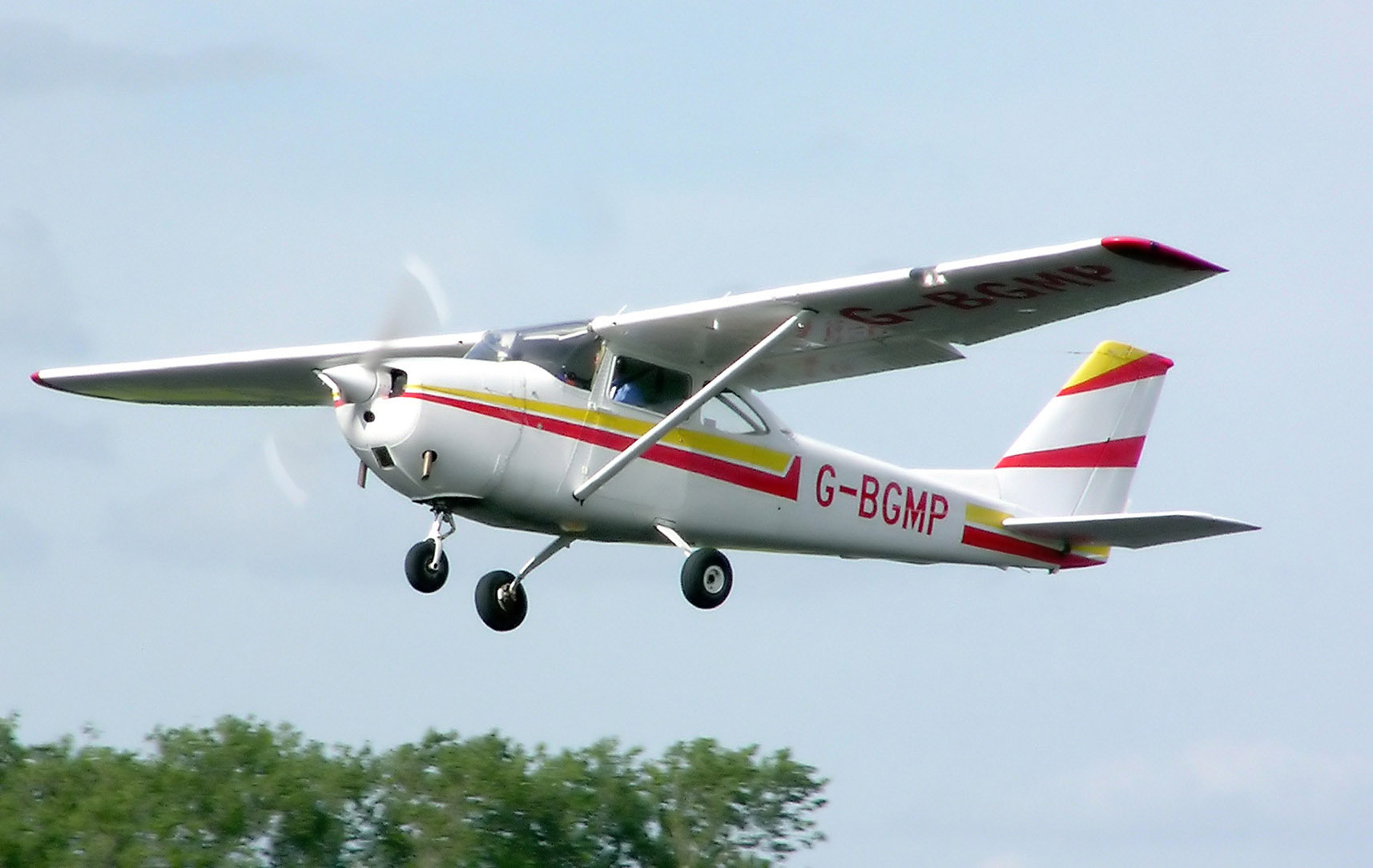
Traditional general aviation fixed-wing light aircraft, the most numerous class of aircraft in the sector

General aviation (GA) has been defined as a civil aircraft operation other than a commercial air transport flight operating to a schedule. Although the International Civil Aviation Organization (ICAO) excludes any form of remunerated aviation from its definition, some commercial operations are often included within the scope of General Aviation (GA). General aviation refers to all flights other than military and scheduled airline flights, both private and commercial.

In 2003 the European Aviation Safety Agency (EASA) was established as the central EU regulator, taking over responsibility for legislating airworthiness and environmental regulation from the national authorities.

== Definitions ==
General aviation flights range from gliders and powered parachutes to large, non-scheduled cargo jet flights. The sector operates business jets, rotorcraft, piston and jet-engined fixed-wing aircraft, gliders of all descriptions, and lighter than air craft. Other commercial GA activities are aerial work, such as surveying and air ambulances, and flight training.

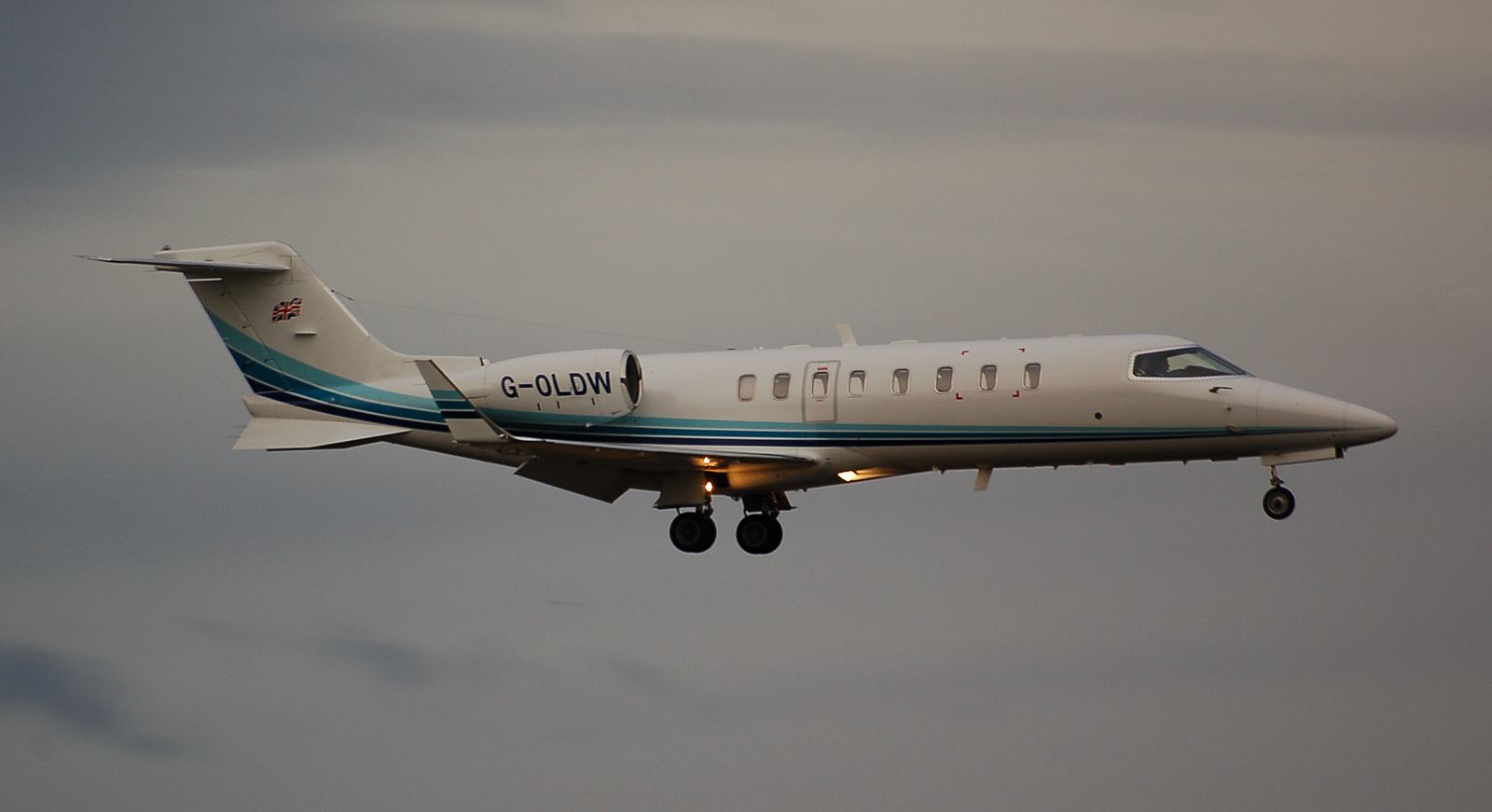
Business aviation is a commercial activity that is considered part of the GA sector.

The International Civil Aviation Organization defines general aviation as "an aircraft operation other than a commercial air transport operation or an aerial work operation." It defines commercial air transport (CAT) as "an aircraft operation involving the transport of passengers, cargo or mail for remuneration or hire", and aerial work as "an aircraft operation in which an aircraft is used for specialized services such as agriculture, construction, photography, surveying, observation and patrol, search and rescue, aerial advertisement, etc."

Organisations in the United Kingdom (UK) describe GA in less restrictive terms that include elements of commercial aviation. The British Business and General Aviation Association interprets it to be "all aeroplane and helicopter flying except that performed by the major airlines and the Armed Services". The General Aviation Awareness Council applies the description "all Civil Aviation operations other than scheduled air services and non-scheduled air transport operations for remuneration or hire". For the purposes of a strategic review of GA in the UK, the Civil Aviation Authority (CAA) defined the scope of GA as "a civil aircraft operation other than a commercial air transport flight operating to a schedule", and considered it necessary to depart from the ICAO definition and include aerial work and minor CAT operations. The major part of the General Aviation is the Sport and Recreational Aviation.

=== European Union ===
Estimates of the European general aviation fleet vary because many aircraft categories, particularly microlights and amateur-built aircraft, are regulated by national authorities rather than centrally by the European Union Aviation Safety Agency (EASA). A European Commission study compiling national registries estimated roughly 13,000 certified general aviation aeroplanes in the EU in the early 2010s, most of them piston aircraft. Separate industry surveys conducted by EASA, the International Council of Aircraft Owner and Pilot Associations (IAOPA), and the General Aviation Manufacturers Association (GAMA) indicate that microlights (ultralight aircraft in the 450–600 kg class) constitute a similarly large or larger fleet segment across Europe, with tens of thousands of aircraft, reflecting the popularity of nationally regulated light aircraft categories in countries such as France, Germany, Italy, and the United Kingdom.

=== UK ===
Facts 2005: 26,000 GA aircraft registered. between 1.25 and 1.35 million hours flown. 28,000 Private Pilot Licence holders (for 47,000 Licences in total), 10,000 certified glider pilots. Some of the 19,000 pilots who hold professional licences are also engaged in GA activities. more than 1,800 aerodromes and landing sites, ranging in size from large regional airports to farm strips, over 80 per cent of GA activity is conducted at 134 of the larger aerodromes.

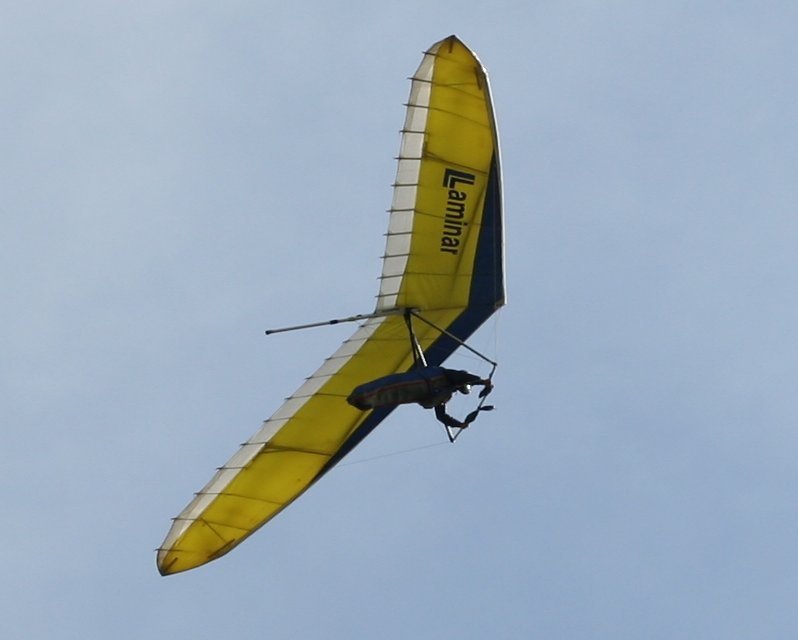
There were 7,000 hang gliders registered in the UK in 2005.

There are an estimated 27,000 civil aircraft registered in the UK, 96 per cent of which are engaged in GA activities.

In 2005 the GA fleet comprised 9,000 fixed-wing aircraft, 4,100 microlights, 1,300 helicopters, 1,800 airships/balloons, 2,500 gliders and some 7,000 hang gliders.

Estimates put the number of foreign-registered GA aircraft based in the UK at 900.

== Regulation ==
The objective of regulation is to "promote high standards of safety in all aspects of aviation". Efforts focus on assuring appropriate standards of airworthiness, pilot licensing, the rules for the movement of aircraft and equipment to be carried.

In 2003 the European Aviation Safety Agency (EASA) was established as the central EU regulator, taking over responsibility for legislating airworthiness and environmental regulation from the national authorities. Proposed developments seek to establish EASA as the single authority throughout the EU, taking over from individual member states the power to regulate all aviation other than that specifically excluded from the scope of EASA.

The EASA launched a working group to update of the regulation. This MDM.032 working group was tasked with developing a concept for better regulation in General Aviation.

European Light Aircraft (ELA).

The main focus is on standards of airworthiness and pilot licensing, and the objective is to promote high standards of safety. At the lighter end of the GA spectrum some regulatory authority is devolved to representative bodies, with gliding currently in transition from a self-regulatory model to more formal governance by EASA.

Airspace regulation necessary to protect an increasing number of commercial air transport (CAT) operations has reduced the area in which GA flights can be freely conducted. The growth in CAT is also making access to larger airports more difficult for the GA sector, and smaller aerodromes are vulnerable to closure and re-development for more profitable uses. The UK planning system has no remit to consider the national significance of GA public transport operations, and generally does not favour the development of smaller aerodromes catering to the GA market.

== Evolution of the activity ==
The single most common class of aircraft is the fixed-wing light aircraft associated with traditional GA, but the main area of growth over the last 20 years has been in the use of more affordable aircraft, such as microlights, amateur built aeroplanes, and smaller helicopters. The most important recent developments for small aircraft been the introduction of advanced avionics (including GPS) that were formerly found only in large airliners, and the introduction of composite materials to make small aircraft lighter and faster. Ultralight and homebuilt aircraft have also become increasingly popular for recreational use, since in most countries that allow private aviation they are much less expensive than certified aircraft.

== GA Safety in Europe ==
About three accidents per day are reported in Europe. As the reporting of every GA accidents and incidents is not mandatory everywhere, these figures may be higher. However, most major accidents are likely to be reflected due to involvement of outside authorities. The European Union Aviation Safety Agency (EASA) and the civil aviation authorities of each country support and encourage the collection of light aircraft accident data in order to provide more in-depth statistics and analysis.

In the UK, there were 27 fatal accidents involving GA aircraft in 2007, resulting in the loss of 48 lives. These compare with 16 accidents claiming a total of 19 lives the previous year, and although the 2007 statistics are higher than average, they are not exceptional.

== European General Aviation associations ==
Flag	Member state	National aero clubs	Micro-light associations	Gliding associations	Link
(European Union)	EU-28	Europe-airsports.fai.org	EMF	*	.eu
(Austria)	Austria	Austrian Aero Club	--	--	.at
(Belgium)	Belgium	Koninklijke Belgische Aëroclub/Aero Club Royal de Belgique	--	--	.be
(Bulgaria)	Bulgaria	-	Bulgarian Association of Light Aviation	--	.bg
(Cyprus)	Cyprus	Cyprus Airsports Federation	--	--	.cy
(Czech Republic)	Czech Republic	Aero Club of the Czech Republic	Light Aircraft Association of the Czech Republic	--	.cz
(Denmark)	Denmark	Denmark Royal Danish Aero Club	Danish Ultra Light Union (DULFU)	--	.dk
(Estonia)	Estonia	-	--	--	.ee
(Finland)	Finland	Finnish Aeronautical Association	Experimental ja Ultrakevyt Toimikunta (EUT) Finland	--	.fi
(France)	France	Fédération Française Aéronautique	Fédération Française de Planeur Ultra-léger Motorisé	--	.fr
(Germany)	Germany	German Aero Club	Deutscher Ultraleichtflugverband e.V.	--	.de
(Greece)	Greece	Hellenic Aeronautical and Airsports Federation	--	--	.gr
(Hungary)	Hungary	Hungarian Aeronautical Association	--	--	.hu
(Republic of Ireland)	Ireland	National Aero Club of Ireland	--	--	.ie
(Italy)	Italy	Aero Club of Italy	--	--	.it
(Latvia)	Latvia	Latvian Aero Club	--	--	.lv
(Lithuania)	Lithuania	Lithuanian Aero Club (LAK)	ULOPF, Ultralengvų orlaivių pilotų federacija	Lithuanian Gliding Sport Federation	.lt
(Luxembourg)	Luxembourg	Luxemburg Aeronautic Federation	--	--	.lu
(Malta)	Malta	-	--	--	.mt
(Netherlands)	Netherlands	KNVvL, Royal Netherlands Aeronautical Association	--	--	.nl
(Norway)	Norway	Norwegian Air sports Association	--	--	.no
(Poland)	Poland	Aero Club of Poland	--	--	.pl
(Portugal)	Portugal	Aero Club de Portugal (AeCP)	Associação Portuguesa de Aviação Ultraleve (APAU)	--	.pt
(Romania)	Romania	Romanian Aeroclub	-	--	.ro
(Serbia)	Serbia	Aeronautical Union of Serbia	--	--	.rs
(Slovakia)	Slovakia	Slovak National Aeroclub	--	--	.sk
(Slovenia)	Slovenia		--	--	.si
(Spain)	Spain	Royal Aero Club of Spain	--	--	.es
(Sweden)	Sweden	Swedish Airsports Association	--	--	.se
(United Kingdom)	United Kingdom	Royal Aero Club of the United Kingdom	British Microlight Aircraft Association	--	.uk

== See also ==
- General aviation
- General aviation in the United Kingdom
- European Aviation Safety Agency
- Transport in the European Union
