= Little Gransden Airfield =

Airport in Cambridgeshire, England

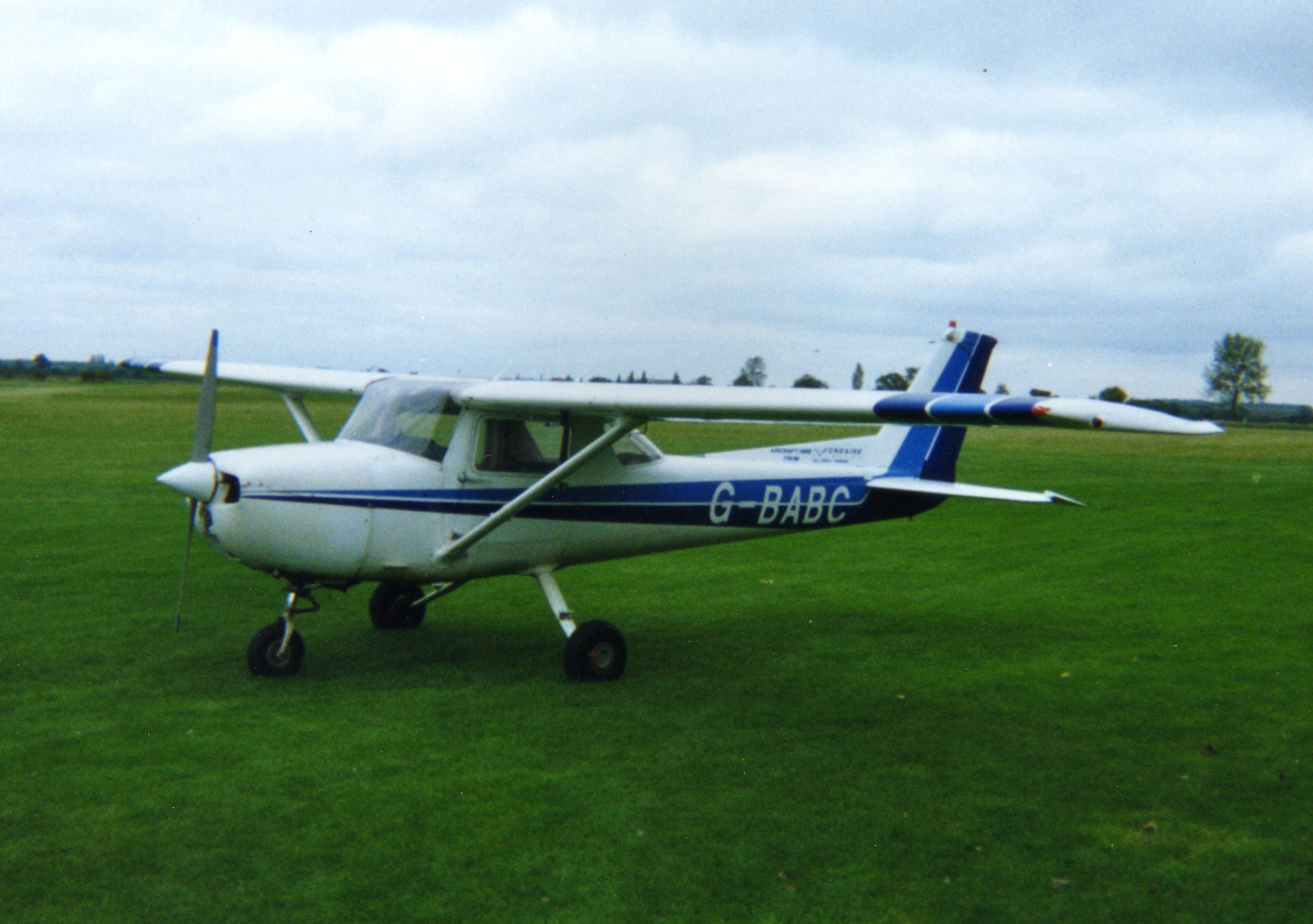
- A Reims Cessna 150, formerly used by Skyline School of Flying, parked next to the hangars
- IATA: none; ICAO: EGMJ

Summary
- Airport type: Public - Prior Permission Required
- Operator: Mark and John Jefferies
- Location: St Neots, Cambridgeshire, England
- Elevation AMSL: 250 ft / 76 m
- Coordinates: 52°09′59″N 0°09′08″W
- Website: https://littlegransdenflyingclub.co.uk

Map
- Location in Cambridgeshire

Runways
Direction	Length		Surface
Direction	m	ft	Surface
10/28	810	2,657	Grass
03/21	n/a	n/a	Grass

Little Gransden Airfield (ICAO: EGMJ) is an unlicensed airfield located near the village of Little Gransden, approximately 6 miles (10 km) southeast of St Neots, Cambridgeshire, England.

Little Gransden Airfield is located in the grounds of Fuller's Hill Farm. It is also the home of Yak UK Ltd., who import, service and sell the Yakovlev range of piston engined aerobatic aircraft.

== Location ==
Pilots climbing out on runway 28 will be able to see the disused runways of RAF Tempsford on the left side just before the railway. RAF Tempsford was an airfield operated by the Special Operations Executive during World War II. Nearby are other former RAF airfields: Gransden Lodge Airfield, now home to the Cambridge Gliding Club; and Bourn.

== Events ==
Each summer the airfield is home to Little Gransden Families Day Out Air & Vintage Vehicle Show which raises money for the Children in Need charity. The 2012 show, the 20th annual event, took place on 26 August, raising over £26000.

== Planning controversy ==
In 1992 South Cambridgeshire District Council served a planning contravention notice on the airfield, which had been operating since 1966. The council was supported by a local pressure group Cambridgeshire Airfields Action Group (CAAG). In 1995 the council served a planning enforcement notice. The airfield, supported by planning consultant Peter Kember and some of some local villagers, argued at a public enquiry that they were operating lawfully based on 10 years' continuous use. The airfield's planning appeal succeeded in 1999 and the airfield was allowed to continue operating. Furthermore, in 2002 Peter Kember succeeded in challenging South Cambridgeshire District Council's Small Airfields Policy which attempted to put further restrictions on Little Gransden and other airfields in the area.

== See also ==
- United Kingdom AIP
- List of airports in the United Kingdom
- Cambridge Bomber and Fighter Society
