= Hayley Wood =

Nature reserve in the United Kingdom

Coordinates: 52.159°N 0.114°W

- Site of Special Scientific Interest
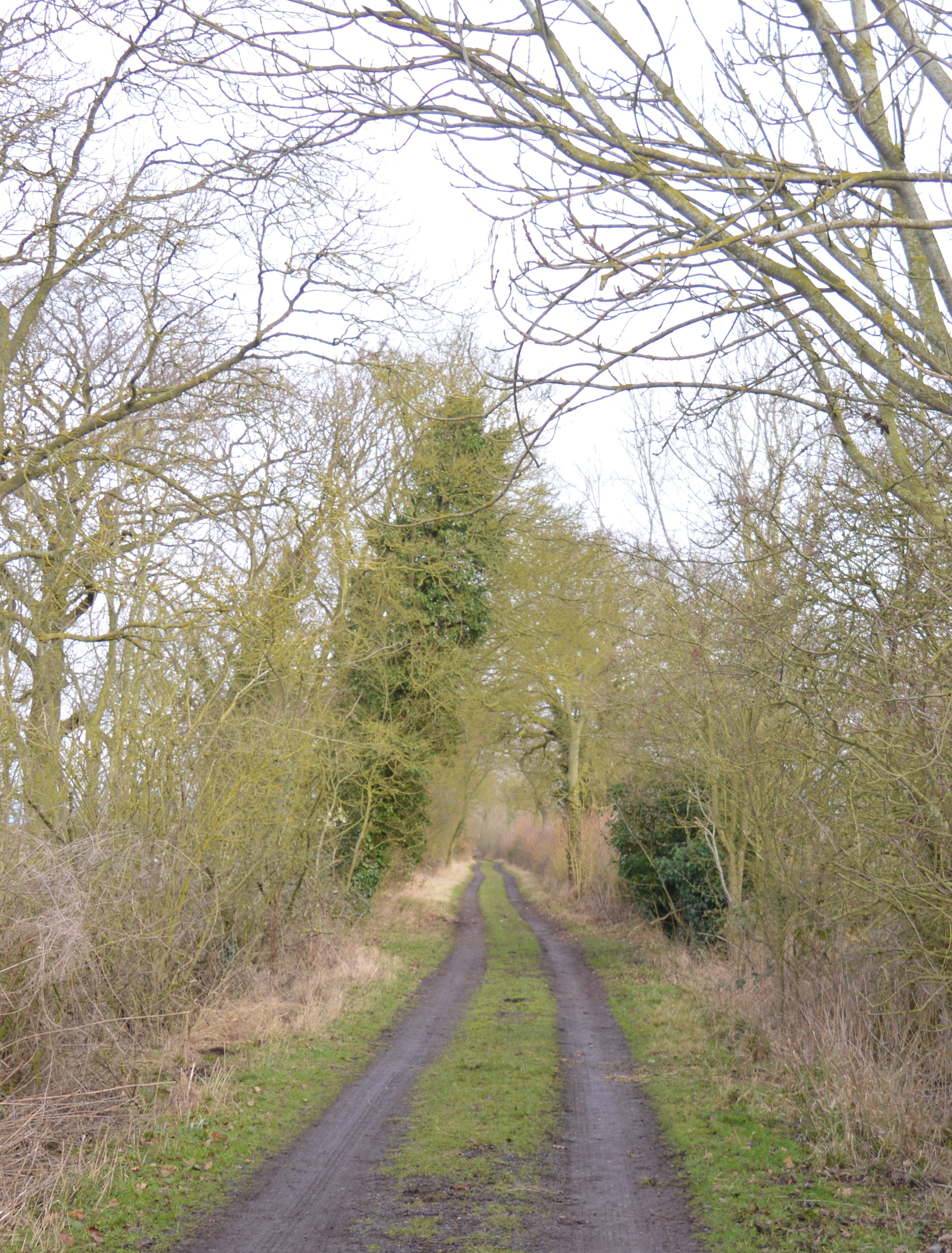
- Location of Hayley Wood.
- Area of search: Cambridgeshire
- Grid reference: TL 291 529
- Interest: Biological
- Area: 51.7 hectares
- Notification date: 1984
- Location map: Magic Map

Hayley Wood is a 51.7-hectare (128-acre) biological Site of Special Scientific Interest south-east of Great Gransden in Cambridgeshire. It is a Nature Conservation Review site, Grade 1, and it is managed by the Wildlife Trust for Bedfordshire, Cambridgeshire and Northamptonshire. It was the subject of a book by the academic and woodland expert Oliver Rackham, listed below, who regularly visited and recorded his observations of the woodland in his notebooks.

== History ==
A large wood in this area of the parish was mentioned in the 1086 Domesday Book, but by 1251 it had been split into two: Hayley Wood (40 acres) and Littlehound Wood (32 acres). Agriculture in the area declined after 1350 and the wooded area expanded; by 1650, Hayley Wood covered 120 acres (0.49 km^{2}) and Littlehound 40 acres. In around 1655, Littlehound was 'new stubbed' and disappeared under cultivation, although its outline can still be seen in the form of field boundaries. Hayley Wood was confiscated from the Bishop of Ely by Queen Elizabeth in 1579 and whenceforth became privately owned.

The Varsity Line - a railway between Bedford and Cambridge - ran along the wood's northern edge between 1863-1969. Now disused and dismantled, its bed hosts a variety of flowers such as hairy violet and clustered bellflower. In 1962, Hayley Wood was the first site to be purchased by the recently formed Cambridgeshire and Isle of Ely Naturalists' Trust (now the Wildlife Trust for Bedfordshire, Cambridgeshire and Northamptonshire).

== Geography ==
Hayley Wood lies in the south-east corner of the civil parish of Little Gransden in Cambridgeshire, 10 miles (17 km) south-west of Cambridge and 45 miles (73 km) north of London. The clay soil is heavy, leading to waterlogged conditions on the flat hilltop.

== Flora and fauna ==
The structure of Hayley Wood is coppice-with-standards of field maple, ash, hazel and hawthorn species, with a canopy of pedunculate oak and small areas of small-leaved elm. Most of the oak trees date from between 1780–1840, older than most woodland oaks.

The soil favours oxlip and meadowsweet – the wood is described as 'one of the largest oxlip woods on the chalky Boulder Clay in Britain'. bluebell and yellow archangel grow in drier parts. Plants typical of ancient woodland, including wood anemone, dog's mercury and early purple orchid, grow; bird's-nest orchid and pale sedge can also be found.

== Management ==
There are many ancient coppice stools in the wood; coppicing was practiced from at least the 13th Century until the early 20th Century, with a revival from 1964. Dead wood is left as it is an excellent habitat for liverworts and woodpeckers.

The rides and glades are mown to keep nutrient levels down. Most of the wood is surrounded by a fence, erected in 1972, to exclude deer, which has reversed the decline in Hayley Wood's Oxlip population.

== Access ==
There is access from the B1046 road by Hayley Lane.

== Sources ==
Oliver Rackham, 1975: Hayley Wood; its history and ecology; Cambridgeshire and Isle of Ely Naturalists' Trust Ltd.
