= Light Aircraft Association =

UK body for amateur aircraft constructors

- Established: 1946; 80 years ago
- Type: Not for profit
- Headquarters: Turweston Aerodrome, Brackley, Northants, United Kingdom
- Field: Aviation advocacy
- Members: 8000 (2011)
- Key people: Patron: Prince Michael of Kent; President: Air Chief Marshal (Rtd) Sir John Allison KCB, CBE, FRAeS, RAF
- Website: www.lightaircraftassociation.co.uk

The Light Aircraft Association (LAA) is the representative body in the United Kingdom for amateur aircraft construction, and recreational and sport flying. It oversees the construction and maintenance of homebuilt aircraft, under an approval from the UK Civil Aviation Authority (CAA).

The LAA was formerly known as the Popular Flying Association and was originally founded in 1946 as the Ultralight Aircraft Association.

== LAA Permit regime ==
The regime for approving amateur-built aircraft in the United Kingdom differs from that in many other countries, of which the United States is the prime example. Instead of the FAA's Experimental airworthiness category, under which an amateur may design, build and operate (and is ultimately responsible for) an aircraft 'for experimental purposes', the UK CAA is required to investigate any such aircraft's 'fitness to fly' and to issue a 'Permit to Fly' when satisfied. The LAA is approved by the CAA to make recommendations for and to revalidate such Permits. Aircraft on a LAA Permit may not be operated commercially and are limited to Day / VFR operation, unless approved for Night / IFR. There are also nominal limits on the number of seats (four) and on maximum take-off weight (2500 lbs), power (260HP) and stalling speed (70 mph). The Permit is valid only in UK airspace unless by agreement with another State, which is normally obtainable for countries in the European Union and many outside it. The Permit has to be renewed annually after the aircraft has been inspected by an inspector appointed by the LAA.

The LAA's remit extends to homebuilt autogyros but not to helicopters. Factory-built classic and vintage aircraft that are no longer supported by their manufacturer have difficulty obtaining a Certificate of Airworthiness, and in such cases the CAA may transfer the type to LAA Permit.

The LAA's remit includes amateur-built microlights but does not extend to factory-built microlights, which are covered by the BMAA. The BMAA's remit substantially overlaps with that of the LAA; but occasional proposals for the merger of the two associations have met with considerable resistance, mainly from the BMAA's majority membership of 2-axis microlight pilots.

== History ==
A letter from aircraft engineer Risteard Mac Roibin, printed in Flight magazine, suggested that it should be possible to regulate ultra-light aircraft without the expense of a Certificate of Airworthiness, subject to it being a tested and approved design, and checked by a licensed aircraft engineer. This led to the formation of the Ultra-Light Aircraft Association, with the first meeting held on 26 October 1946. The first priority of the association was to convince the government that light aircraft did not need a Certificate of Airworthiness. The government agreed that the association could issue a Permit to Fly for aircraft not exceeding 1,000 lb in weight, maximum engine power of 40 hp and a landing speed of no more than 40 mph. The supervision during construction and final inspection would need to be done by ULAA inspectors.

The association took on the name Popular Flying Association in 1949. Initially, and still primarily, an engineering organisation for approving designs for homebuilding and regulating their construction and maintenance, it is now also active in encouraging sport and recreational flying and campaigning for a regulatory regime that will provide as little restriction as possible, consistent with safety, for the construction and operation of homebuilt aircraft and Classic and Vintage factory built aircraft that can no longer hold a full Certificate of Airworthiness. Membership in 2011 was around 8,000.

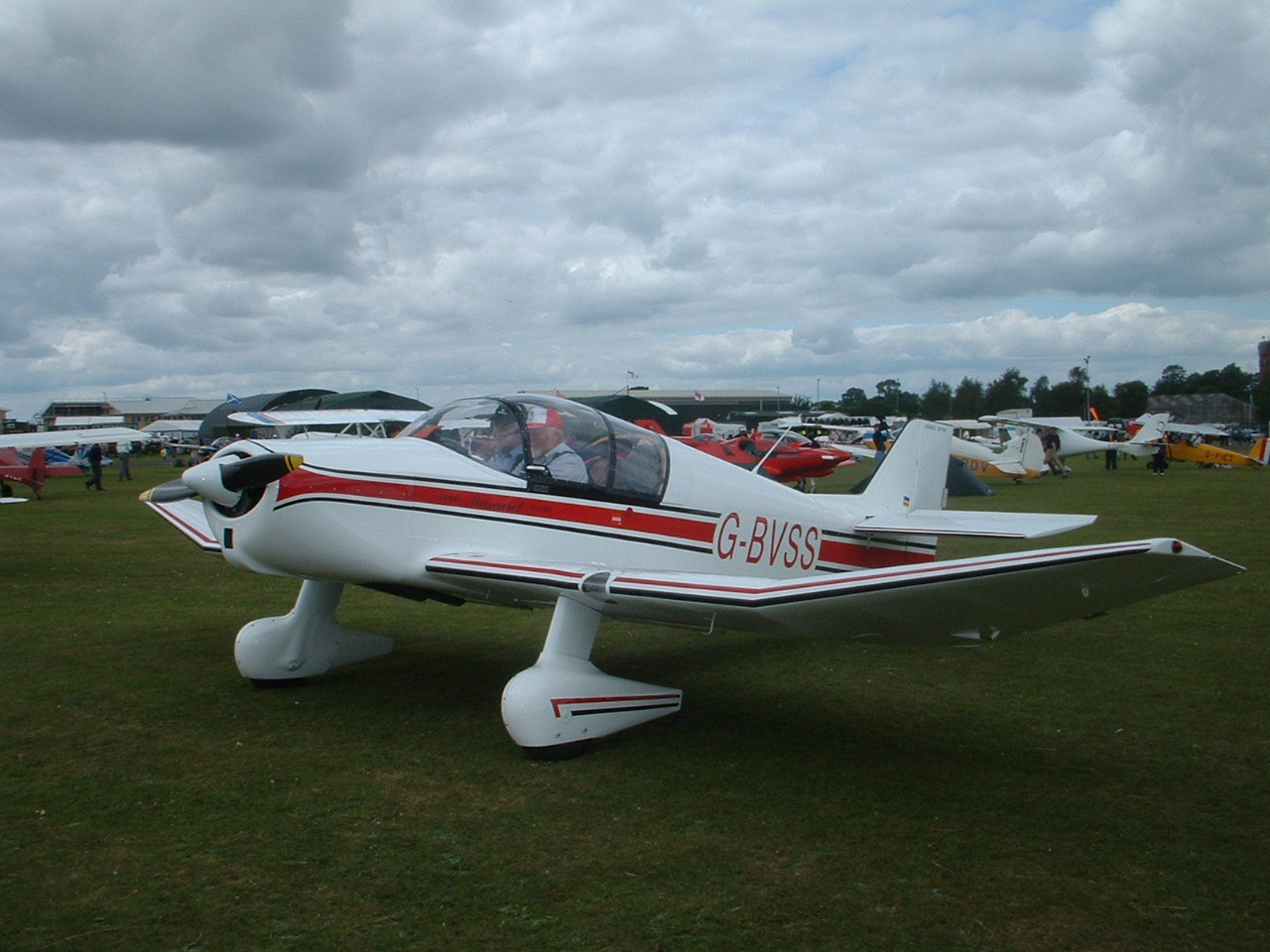
One of many light aircraft attending the annual PFA Rally, at Cranfield, 2002

It publishes a monthly full-colour member magazine, Light Aviation (formerly Popular Flying) and holds an annual rally, usually in August or September, probably the largest gathering of light aircraft outside the USA. The 2026 event is scheduled for 4–6 September, 2026, and will take place at Leicester Airport.

It has a network of Member Clubs (known as "Struts") throughout the UK, each providing a geographically centred social focus for LAA members, to which members of the public are warmly welcomed. There are also a number of Type Clubs, catering to members who are constructing or operating certain aircraft types.

The Association changed its name to the Light Aircraft Association (LAA) on 1 January 2008, along with the magazine's name being changed to "Light Aviation"
