= British Microlight Aircraft Association =

The British Microlight Aircraft Association (BMAA) is an organisation that governs microlight aircraft in the UK.; it is a member organisation that exists to benefit its members with respect to flying and operating microlight aircraft in the United Kingdom. Its aims are listed in the Articles of Association.

Originally the British Minimum Aircraft Association (with the same logo and acronym), BMAA became the delegated authority for airworthiness and flight training of most microlight flying in the United Kingdom around 1984 with the introduction of British Civil Airworthiness Requirement (BCAR) Section S which was the world's first formal airworthiness standard for microlight aeroplanes. Its delegations are primarily from the Civil Aviation Authority (CAA)

The BMAA issues NPPL licences to newly qualified pilots. The BMAA is also approved by the Civil Aviation Authority to revalidate a microlight aircraft's Permit to Fly

The BMAA administers all weightshift controlled microlight aeroplanes in the United Kingdom, all regulated powered parachute microlights, and a large proportion of 3-axis controlled microlight aeroplanes, including all "factory built" microlights. The Light Aircraft Association is an equivalent organisation which administers a proportion of the amateur built microlight aeroplanes.

The BMAA's remit overlaps with that of the UK's Light Aircraft Association (LAA), and a merger of the two associations was proposed in 2008 and also in 2019; on each occasion the LAA declined to progress talks to completion.
