= List of Sites of Special Scientific Interest in Northamptonshire =

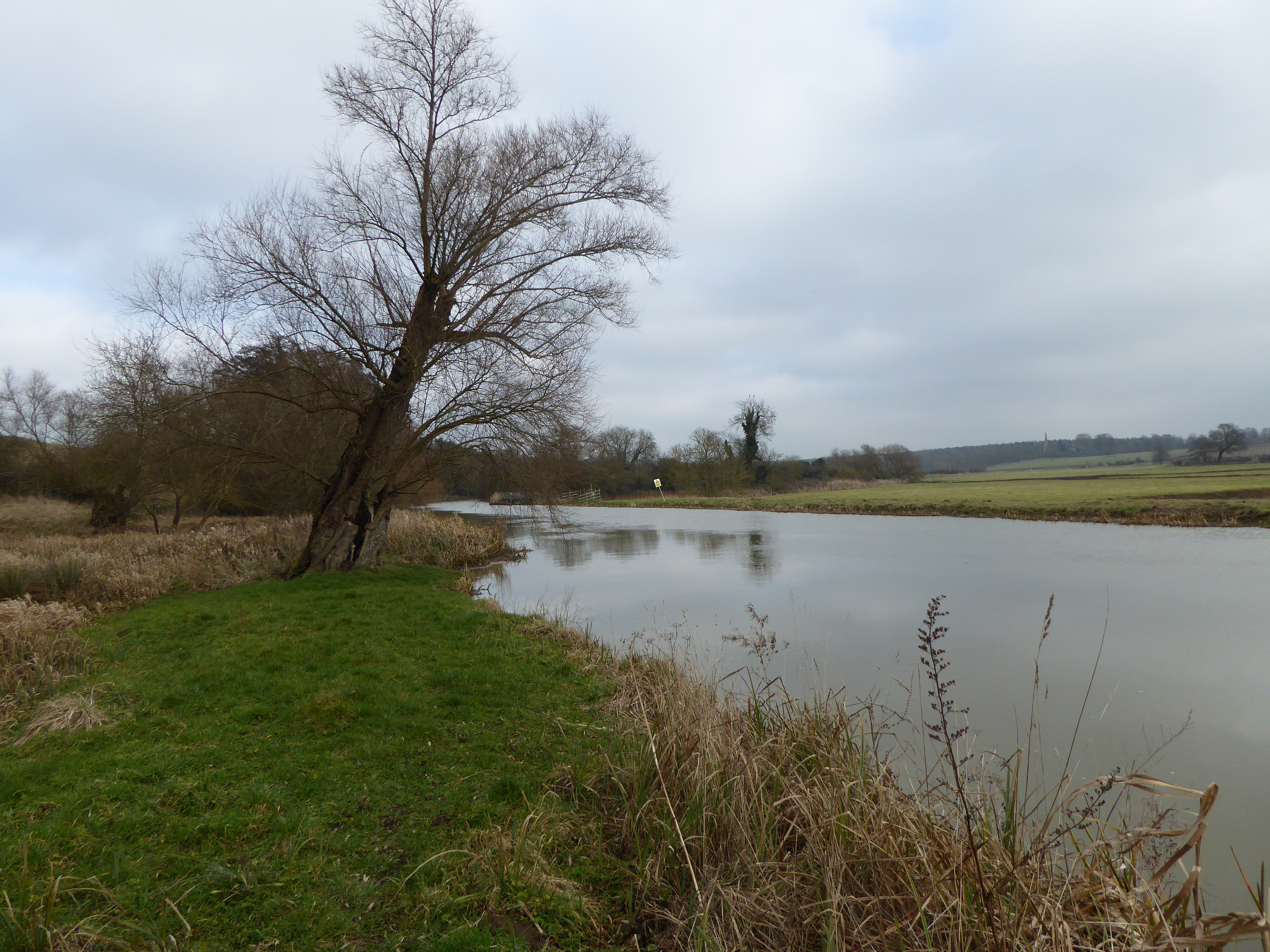
The River Nene in Wadenhoe Marsh and Achurch Meadow

Northamptonshire is a county in the East Midlands of England. It has an area of 236,700 hectares (914 sq mi) and a population estimated in mid-2016 at 733,000. The county is bordered by Warwickshire, Leicestershire, Cambridgeshire, Bedfordshire, Buckinghamshire, Oxfordshire, Rutland and Lincolnshire. It was governed by Northamptonshire County Council and seven district and borough councils, Corby, Daventry, East Northamptonshire, Kettering, Northampton, South Northamptonshire and Wellingborough but since 1 April by the unitary authorities of North Northamptonshire and West Northamptonshire. The county flower is the cowslip.

A ridge of low Jurassic hills runs through the county, separating the basins of the Welland and Nene rivers. The county has good transportation connections as it is crossed by two main railway lines and the M1 motorway, and it has many small industrial centres rather than large conurbations.

In England, Sites of Special Scientific Interest (SSSIs) are designated by Natural England, which is responsible for protecting England's natural environment. Designation as an SSSI gives legal protection to the most important wildlife and geological sites. As of July 2017, there are 57 sites designated in Northamptonshire, 48 for their biological interest and 9 for their geological interest. Eight are Geological Conservation Review sites, four are Nature Conservation Review sites, and fourteen are managed by the Wildlife Trust for Bedfordshire, Cambridgeshire and Northamptonshire. The largest is Upper Nene Valley Gravel Pits, which is a Ramsar internationally important wetland site and a Special Protection Area under the European Union Directive on the Conservation of Wild Birds. The smallest is Irchester Old Lodge Pit, which is described in the Geological Conservation Review as a Middle Jurassic site of national importance.

== Key ==
=== Interest ===
- B = a site of biological interest
- G = a site of geological interest

=== Public access ===
- FP = access to footpaths through the site only
- NO = no public access to site
- PP = public access to part of site
- YES = public access to site

=== Other classifications ===
- GCR = Geological Conservation Review
- LNR = Local nature reserve
- NCR = Nature Conservation Review
- NNR = National nature reserve
- Ramsar = Ramsar site, an internationally important wetland site
- RHPG = Register of Historic Parks and Gardens
- SPA = Special Protection Area under the European Union Directive on the Conservation of Wild Birds
- WT = Woodland Trust
- WTBCN = Wildlife Trust for Bedfordshire, Cambridgeshire and Northamptonshire

== Sites ==
Site name	Photograph	B	G	Area (Note: The area and grid reference are taken from the "Details" page for each site on the Natural England database.)	Public access	Location	Other classifications	Map (Note: The maps are provided by Natural England on the Magic Map website.)	Citation (Note: Citations are provided for each site by Natural England.)	Description
Alder Wood and Meadow	Alder Wood	✓		13.2 hectares (33 acres)	YES	Corby; 52.453°N 0.769°W; SP 837 846		Map	Citation	This semi-natural ancient broadleaved wood is a surviving fragment of the medieval Royal Forest of Rockingham. It is mainly ash, and the ground flora on base rich soil includes tufted hair-grass, dog's mercury and enchanter's nightshade. The meadow is agriculturally unimproved, and it has surviving medieval ridge and furrow.
Aldwincle Marsh	Aldwincle Marsh	✓		2.0 hectares (4.9 acres)	NO	Aldwincle; 52.416°N 0.525°W; TL 004 807		Map	Citation	This marsh and fen on shallow peat is formed by seepage from the boundary between clay and limestone. Plants in wet areas include blunt-flowered rush, marsh pennywort, wild angelica and Menyanthes trifoliata, a rare species of bogbean. Drier areas have grasses and herbs which attract butterflies and dragonflies. The site includes a stretch of Harpers Brook.
Ashton Wold	Ashton Wold	✓		54.0 hectares (133 acres)	YES	Oundle; 52.475°N 0.394°W; TL 091 875	RHPG	Map	Citation	Ashton Wold was owned by Charles Rothschild, the founder of The Wildlife Trusts. It is ancient secondary woodland with mature oak, ash and birch trees. The thick shrub layer includes hawthorn and buckthorn.
Badby Wood	Badby Wood	✓		47.2 hectares (117 acres)	YES	Badby; 52.220°N 1.177°W; SP 563 582		Map	Citation	This is ancient semi-natural woodland on acidic soils, and it has been forested for over 700 years. It is mainly pedunculate oak, with varied ground flora including creeping soft-grass, wood anemone, yellow archangel and bluebell. There is also small marsh with very diverse herbs.
Badsaddle, Withmale Park and Bush Walk Woods	Withmale Park Wood	✓		25.2 hectares (62 acres)	YES	Wellingborough; 52.340°N 0.779°W; SP 832 720		Map	Citation	This is ancient coppice woodland with oak and ash on wet calcareous soils. Ground flora include herb paris, goldilocks buttercup and four species of orchid.
Banhaw, Spring and Blackthorn's Woods	Banhaw Wood	✓		123.4 hectares (305 acres)	PP	Corby; 52.480°N 0.571°W; SP 971 878		Map	Citation	These woods are one of the largest remnants of the medieval Royal Forest of Rockingham. They are mainly ash and pedunculate oak on wet calcareous clay soils. The ground flora is diverse, and there are grasses such as tufted hair-grass, rough meadow-grass and wood melick.
Birch Spinney and Mawsley Marsh	Mawsley Marsh	✓		12.3 hectares (30 acres)	NO	Broughton; 52.382°N 0.812°W; SP 809 766		Map	Citation	Birch Spinney is a rare type of ash-maple woodland partly on peat. Mawsley Marsh is described by Natural England as "one of the finest remaining Northamptonshire marshes", with flora including blunt-flowered rush, jinted rush and water horsetail. There is also a stretch of a dismantled railway line.
Blisworth Rectory Farm Quarry	Blisworth Rectory Farm Quarry		✓	1.0 hectare (2.5 acres)	NO	Blisworth; 52.171°N 0.954°W; SP 716 530	GCR	Map	Citation	This site exposes White Limestone dating to the Middle Jurassic Bathonian stage, around 168 to 166 million years ago. Common fossils are brachiopods, corals and gastropods, and there are also nautiloids and vertebrate teeth.
Bosworth Mill Meadow	Bosworth Mill Meadow	✓		5.7 hectares (14 acres)	YES	Welford; 52.435°N 1.077°W; SP 628 822		Map	Citation	This hay meadow is traditionally managed. The main flora are crested dog's-tail and common knapweed, with meadow foxtail and great burnet in wet areas. Springs produce seepages which are rich in mosses and sedges. Dry upper slopes are species poor.
Bozeat Meadow	Bozeat Meadow	✓		2.6 hectares (6.4 acres)	NO	Bozeat; 52.222°N 0.682°W; SP 901 590		Map	Citation	This is unimproved grassland on well-drained clay and loam soils. It has medieval ridge and furrow and diverse flora, including crested dog's-tail, downy oat-grass, quaking grass and dwarf thistle. There are also mature hedgerows and a spring.
Bucknell Wood Meadows	Bucknell Wood Meadows	✓		9.2 hectares (23 acres)	YES	Silverstone; 52.099°N 1.065°W; SP 641 449		Map	Citation	This site consists of agriculturally unimproved fields on seasonally waterlogged soils. The flora is diverse with many herbs, including bird's-foot-trefoil, meadow buttercup and devil's-bit scabious. Variations in the types of flora are partly due to different soils and partly to previous management practices.
Bugbrooke Meadows	Bugbrooke Meadows	✓		10.1 hectares (25 acres)	YES	Nether Heyford; 52.223°N 1.018°W; SP 671 587	WTBCN	Map	Citation	These meadows on the bank of the River Nene which have not been treated with fertilisers, and they often flood in winter. They are probably unique in the county, and they have very diverse damp grassland flora such as jointed rush and greater pond sedge. There are ancient hedges which are important both historically and as a habitat for wildlife.
Bulwick Meadows	Bulwick Meadows	✓		1.2 hectares (3.0 acres)	PP	Bulwick; 52.539°N 0.584°W; SP 961 943		Map	Citation	These marshy meadows are in the flood plain of the Willow Brook. There are diverse wetland flora, including rare species, and it is the only known locality in the county for the flat-sedge blysmus compressus and common bistort. It is also one of the very few sites in the county where snipe breed.
Calender Meadows	Calender Meadows	✓		3.1 hectares (7.7 acres)	NO	Guilsborough; 52.368°N 0.995°W; SP 685 749		Map	Citation	This is described by Natural England as "a nationally important site for its lowland unimproved neutral grassland". It has a wide variety of native herbs and grasses. There are herbs such as lady's bedstraw, meadow vetchling and common bird's-foot trefoil, and grasses include red fescue, sweet vernal-grass and false oat-grass.
Collyweston Great Wood and Easton Hornstocks	Collyweston Great Wood	✓		151.5 hectares (374 acres)	NO	Easton on the Hill; 52.594°N 0.507°W; TF 012 006	NCR, NNR	Map	Citation	These woods have ash, lime and sessile oak, together with wild service-trees, which is an indicator of ancient woodland. The ground flora is very rich, including locally unusual plants such as lily-of-the-valley, wood spurge, great wood-rush, violet helleborine and columbine.
Collyweston Quarries	Collyweston Quarries	✓		6.6 hectares (16 acres)	YES	Easton on the Hill; 52.623°N 0.519°W; TF 003 038	WTBCN	Map	Citation	This former limestone quarry is now rough grassland on Jurassic limestone. The flora is diverse, and more than a hundred flowering plants have been recorded, including wild thyme, dropwort, dyer's greenweed and clustered bellflower. There is a substantial butterfly population.
Collyweston Slate Mine	Collyweston Slate Mine		✓	0.9 hectares (2.2 acres)	NO	Easton on the Hill; 52.616°N 0.524°W; TF 000 030	GCR	Map	Citation	This slate mine was operated until 1963, quarrying Collyweston slate, which dates to the Jurassic. The shaft exposes a section described by Natural England as "stratigraphically important", and it is the type locality for the slate.
Coombe Hill Hollow	Coombe Hill Hollow	✓		4.3 hectares (11 acres)	NO	Welford; 52.446°N 1.003°W; SP 678 835		Map	Citation	This steep narrow valley has neutral grassland which has never been subject to fertilisers or herbicides, and it has diverse flora. Grasses include brown bent, red fescue, Yorkshire fog and crested dog's-tail. Lime-rich areas have harebell and mouse-ear hawkweed, and there are locally important butterfly populations.
Cowthick Quarry	Cowthick Quarry		✓	1.4 hectares (3.5 acres)	NO	Corby; 52.482°N 0.639°W; SP 925 879		Map	Citation	This site exposes Middle Jurassic rocks dating to 174 to 163 million years ago, and in the view of Natural England it has "the best and most instructive sections" of the period in the Midlands. A fault during the Pleistocene has caused the juxtaposition of six Jurassic formations.
Cranford St John	Cranford St John		✓	2.8 hectares (6.9 acres)	NO	Kettering; 52.378°N 0.645°W; SP 923 764	GCR	Map	Citation	This former quarry exposes rocks from the Rutland Formation and up to nearly the top of the White Limestone Formation, dating to the Middle Jurassic Bathonian stage, 168 to 166 million years ago. The site is the type section for a freshwater clay bed which is thought to result from a widespread storm deposit.
Dungee Corner Meadow	Dungee Corner Meadow	✓		5.1 hectares (13 acres)	NO	Bozeat; 52.231°N 0.643°W; SP 927 600		Map	Citation	This well-drained hay meadow on boulder clay is traditionally managed, and no artificial fertilisers or herbicides have been used, so it has a diverse flora. More than twenty grass species have been recorded, including sweet vernal, Yorkshire fog, sheep's fescue, quaking grass and crested dog's-tail. There is also a population of the locally rare green-winged orchid.
Everdon Stubbs	Everdon Stubbs	✓		29.5 hectares (73 acres)	YES	Farthingstone; 52.205°N 1.115°W; SP 605 566	WT	Map	Citation	This woodland site has areas of acidic free-draining soil, and other damper areas. It is described by Natural England as an important site for fungi, and there is a diverse range of breeding birds. There are locally uncommon plants such as wild daffodil, orpine and bitter vetch.
Finedon Top Lodge Quarry	Finedon Top Lodge Quarry		✓	0.9 hectares (2.2 acres)	FP	Finedon; 52.320°N 0.642°W; SP 926 699	GCR	Map	Citation	This site shows a complete section dating to the Rutland Formation of the Bathonian stage of the Middle Jurassic, 168 to 166 million years ago. It is the type section for the Wellingborough Member, and contains fossils of oysters and Rhynchonellida.
Geddington Chase	Geddington Chase	✓		39.1 hectares (97 acres)	NO	Corby; 52.453°N 0.670°W; SP 904 847		Map	Citation	Geddington Chase is a surviving fragment of the medieval Royal Forest of Rockingham. Most of the Chase is commercially managed, and the SSSI is an area of semi-natural wet ash-maple woodland on Midland boulder clay. The ground flora is diverse, with plants including bluebell, dog's mercury, tufted hair-grass, and a few wild daffodils.
Glapthorn Cow Pasture	Glapthorn Cow Pasture	✓		28.2 hectares (70 acres)	YES	Oundle; 52.504°N 0.525°W; TL 002 905	WTBCN	Map	Citation	This site has ash-maple woodland, and dense blackthorn scrub. It is described by Natural England as one of the most important sites in Britain for the black hairstreak butterfly, which requires a habitat of prunus species such as blackthorn. The scrub also provides nesting sites for nightingales.
Hardwick Lodge Meadow	Hardwick Lodge Meadow	✓		10.0 hectares (25 acres)	YES	Wellingborough; 52.324°N 0.777°W; SP 834 702		Map	Citation	This unimproved grassland on boulder clay has a rich variety of flora, including many rare in the county. Crested hair-grass and salad burnet are found in drier parts, and a marshy area next to a stream has common spotted-orchid and the only population in Northamptonshire of heath spotted-orchid.
Helmdon Disused Railway	Helmdon Disused Railway	✓		16.6 hectares (41 acres)	YES	Brackley; 52.067°N 1.143°W; SP 588 412		Map	Citation	This is Jurassic grassland, and it also has limestone spoil heaps have a very diverse floral community. Butterflies include the nationally scarce wood white and five nationally declining species. It is the only location in the county for the small blue butterfly.
High Wood and Meadow	High Meadow	✓		16.5 hectares (41 acres)	YES	Daventry; 52.188°N 1.136°W; SP 591 547	WTBCN	Map	Citation	The wood is ancient and semi-natural on acid soils. It has diverse ground flora, including yellow pimpernel, hairy wood-rush and broad-leaved helleborine. The meadow is acid grassland of a type which is now uncommon, and there are also areas of neutral grassland and marsh on silty peat. There are many ant hills of the yellow meadow ant.
Irchester Old Lodge Pit	Irchester Old Lodge Pit		✓	0.4 hectares (0.99 acres)	NO	Irchester; 52.275°N 0.661°W; SP 914 649	GCR	Map	Citation	This is described by Natural England as "a key Middle Jurassic locality important for the information it yields on both Bathonian environments and stratigraphy", 168 to 166 million years ago. It exposes White Limestone which has many fossils, especially molluscs.
King's Cliffe Banks	King's Cliffe Banks	✓		7.7 hectares (19 acres)	YES	King's Cliffe; 52.564°N 0.505°W; TL 014 972		Map	Citation	This former quarry has undulating calcareous grassland which is grazed by rabbits and cattle. It has a rich variety of flora, including sheep's fescue, dwarf thistle, mouse-ear hawkweed, wild thyme and common rock-rose. There are many bryophytes and lichens.
Mantles Heath	Mantles Heath	✓		13.7 hectares (34 acres)	YES	Daventry; 52.192°N 1.127°W; SP 597 552		Map	Citation	Most of this woodland site is on acid soil, but the western part is on calcareous and poorly drained clay, and has a diverse flora. Locally uncommon plants include wood vetch, opposite-leaved golden-saxifrage and slender St John's wort.
Mill Crook	Mill Crook	✓		5.9 hectares (15 acres)	YES	Towcester; 52.110°N 0.872°W; SP 773 463	WTBCN	Map	Citation	Signs of medieval ridge and furrow still survive on this traditionally managed hay meadow on the bank of the River Tove. It has diverse flora, with grasses such as meadow foxtail and sweet vernal-grass, and herbs including great burnet and ribwort plantain.
Old Sulehay Forest	Old Sulehay Forest	✓		34.8 hectares (86 acres)	YES	King's Cliffe; 52.574°N 0.434°W; TL 062 985	WTBCN	Map	Citation	This ancient forest has a number of different soil conditions and coppice types, and the ground flora is diverse. Abundant herbs include dog's mercury, bracken, bramble, ramsons, wood anemone and bluebells.
Pipewell Woods	Pipewell Woods	✓		85.3 hectares (211 acres)	YES	Corby; 52.467°N 0.775°W; SP 833 861	NCR	Map	Citation	The woods are an example of wet ash-maple woodland, some parts in a nationally rare form. It has diverse flora including the locally rare giant bellflower, herb paris and wood speedwell. Open grassy areas provide additional habitats for birds and insects.
Pitsford Reservoir	Pitsford Reservoir	✓		413.1 hectares (1,021 acres)	YES	Brixworth; 52.324°N 0.867°W; SP 773 701	WTBCN	Map	Citation	This is the largest body of water in the county, and is used by wintering wildfowl, including the northern shoveler in nationally important numbers. Over 60 species of birds breed on the site, such as the great crested grebe, little grebe, teal, kingfisher and reed warbler.
Plumpton Pasture	Plumpton Pasture	✓		3.6 hectares (8.9 acres)	NO	Towcester; 52.128°N 1.133°W; SP 594 480		Map	Citation	There are medieval ridge and furrows on this unimproved meadow on clay. The drier ridge tops have many herbs, while the damp furrows are dominated by creeping bent and Yorkshire fog grasses. There are also mature hedges and a small pond.
Racecourse Farm Fields	Racecourse Farm Fields	✓		5.0 hectares (12 acres)	NO	Easton on the Hill; 52.626°N 0.498°W; TF 017 042		Map	Citation	This former quarry is grassland on Jurassic limestone. The flora is diverse, with over thirty flowering plant species in each square metre. There are several locally rare plants, such as dodder, autumn gentian, clustered bellflower and small scabious. The sward is kept short by grazing by sheep and cattle.
Ramsden Corner Plantation	Ramsden Corner Plantation	✓		3.2 hectares (7.9 acres)	YES	Northampton; 52.203°N 1.089°W; SP 623 564	WTBCN	Map	Citation	A stream runs through this valley site, which also has acidic grassland, woodland and scrub on clay and sand. Plants such as wood millet, wood-sorrel and wood vetch are indicators of ancient woodland. Opposite-leaved golden-saxifrage is found on wet slopes.
River Ise and Meadows	River Ise	✓		13.5 hectares (33 acres)	PP	Geddington; 52.438°N 0.719°W; SP 871 830	WTBCN	Map	Citation	The river is described by Natural England as "the best example in the county of a lowland river on clay, fed by base-rich water". The banks have tall fen, woodland and grassland, and there is also a species rich flood meadow. The river has many bends and loops, with silty pools and gravel shoals. The invertebrates are diverse, and there is a population of the nationally declining freshwater crayfish Austropotamobius pallipes.
Roade Cutting	Roade Cutting		✓	15.2 hectares (38 acres)	NO	Roade; 52.166°N 0.906°W; SP 749 525	GCR	Map	Citation	The cutting exposes rocks dating to the Middle Jurassic Bathonian stage, between 168 and 166 million years ago. It is described by Natural England as important for reconstructing the environment of deposition during the period, and correlating the White Limestone Formation in Oxfordshire with that of the East Midlands.
Salcey Forest	Salcey Forest	✓		159.6 hectares (394 acres)	YES	Hartwell; 52.152°N 0.818°W; SP 809 510		Map	Citation	This large forest has many mature oak trees. The diverse ground flora includes bluebells, false brome, pendulous sedge and enchanter's nightshade. There are many breeding birds and nationally notable moth species.
Short Wood	Short Wood	✓		25.3 hectares (63 acres)	YES	Oundle; 52.511°N 0.505°W; TL 015 913	WTBCN	Map	Citation	Short Wood is a small remnant of the medieval royal hunting Royal Forest of Rockingham. It is ancient semi-natural woodland with the dominant trees being ash and pedunculate oak. Flora include several local rarities such as wood speedwell, bird's nest orchid and greater butterfly orchid.
Southfield Farm Marsh	Southfield Farm Marsh	✓		8.6 hectares (21 acres)	PP	Kettering; 52.374°N 0.702°W; SP 884 758	WTBCN	Map	Citation	This wetland site has tall plants such as lesser pond-sedge and slender tufted-sedge, which provides cover for reed buntings and sedge warblers. Mammals include otters, and there are birds such as red kites and buzzards. Purple loosestrife is found in grassland areas.
Stoke and Bowd Lane Woods	Stoke Wood	✓		36.4 hectares (90 acres)	PP	Corby; 52.470°N 0.820°W; SP 802 864	WTBCN	Map	Citation	These ancient semi-natural woods were formerly part of the medieval Royal Forest of Rockingham. The main tree species is pedunculate oak, with other species such as ash and birch. Ground flora include herb paris, wood sorrel, yellow archangel, early-purple orchid and greater butterfly-orchid.
Sudborough Green Lodge Meadows	Sudborough Green Lodge Meadows	✓		13.6 hectares (34 acres)	NO	Sudborough; 52.447°N 0.573°W; SP 970 841	NCR	Map	Citation	This site consists of two hay meadows, one of which is agriculturally unimproved and has large areas of medieval ridge and furrow. An experiment in trying to create attractive grasslands in the other field has potential for scientific research. Ponds, scrub, willow trees, hedgerows and wild pear trees add to the ecological value.
Syresham Marshy Meadows	Syresham Marshy Meadows	✓		17.8 hectares (44 acres)	PP	Silverstone; 52.078°N 1.067°W; SP 640 425		Map	Citation	This site consists of two nearby areas of wetland in valleys which drain into the River Great Ouse. The northern one is a mire on shallow peat, and the southern one is agriculturally unimproved grassland and marsh on diverse soils, which has over a hundred flowering plant species.
Thrapston Station Quarry	Thrapston Station Quarry		✓	4.5 hectares (11 acres)	NO	Thrapston; 52.388°N 0.533°W; SP 999 776	GCR	Map	Citation	This site has the most important remaining Middle Jurassic Cornbrash geological section in the Midlands. It is the type site for the Bathonian Blisworth Clay section, dating to 168 to 166 million years ago, and it has the only complete exposure of this section. Diagnostic ammonites have helped to date the site, which has also yielded important Bryozoan fossils.
Titchmarsh Meadow	Titchmarsh Meadow	✓		2.2 hectares (5.4 acres)	NO	Titchmarsh; 52.405°N 0.487°W; TL 030 796		Map	Citation	This poorly drained field has a rich variety of plant species, including greater bird's-foot-trefoil, southern marsh-orchid and pepper saxifrage. A medieval fish pond, which has been drained, has marsh vegetation. Hedges, streams and ditches provide a valuable habitat for invertebrates and small mammals.
Twywell Gullet	Twywell Gullet	✓		17.1 hectares (42 acres)	PP	Kettering; 52.388°N 0.614°W; SP 944 775	WTBCN	Map	Citation	Twywell Gullet is a former ironstone quarry which has deep cuttings with steeply sloping banks. It has species-rich limestone grassland on the slopes and ponds and scrub in the bottoms. There are a number of uncommon ground nesting bees and wasps, and beetles include the nationally rare ruddy darter.
Upper Cherwell at Trafford House	Upper Cherwell at Trafford House		✓	18.6 hectares (46 acres)	YES	Eydon; 52.135°N 1.229°W; SP 528 488	GCR	Map	Citation	This site is at the confluence of the River Cherwell and Eydon Brook. They are underfit streams, which have channels which are small for the size of their valleys. According to Natural England, the site has played an important role in the development of the theory of underfit streams. Deposits in a paleochannel could enable reconstruction of the environmental history.
Upper Nene Valley Gravel Pits	Stanwick Lakes	✓		1,382.4 hectares (3,416 acres)	PP	Rushden; 52.314°N 0.639°W; SP 928 693	LNR, Ramsar, SPA, WTBCN	Map	Citation	This site is described by Natural England as "a nationally important site for its breeding bird assemblage of lowland open waters and their margins". There are at least 21 breeding bird species, including mute swans, tufted ducks, little grebes, great crested grebes, little ringed plovers and redshanks.
Wadenhoe Marsh and Achurch Meadow	Wadenhoe Marsh and Achurch Meadow	✓		47.5 hectares (117 acres)	PP	Oundle; 52.433°N 0.517°W; TL 009 826		Map	Citation	This complex site on both sides of the River Nene has a variety of habitats and a diverse range of fauna and flora. The west of the river is alder woodland and marshy grassland. On the east there is the largest example in the county of unimproved grassland on alluvium and gravel, with over 100 flowering plant species. An oxbow in the river is a site for rare plants.
Wakerley Spinney	Wakerley Spinney	✓		4.4 hectares (11 acres)	NO	King's Cliffe; 52.577°N 0.577°W; SP 965 986		Map	Citation	This is a remnant of the medieval Royal Forest of Rockingham, and it has broadleaved woodland and semi-natural grassland. The most common trees are pedunculate oak, ash, sycamore and downy birch. Locally uncommon flowering plants include woodruff, violet helleborine and fly orchid.
Weldon Park	Weldon Park	✓		51.7 hectares (128 acres)	NO	Weldon; 52.500°N 0.607°W; SP 946 900		Map	Citation	This ancient woodland is mainly ash trees, maple and hazel. It has diverse flora, especially on grassland rides, and unusual plants on the wettest soils. Insects include the uncommon purple emperor butterfly.
Whittlewood Forest	Whittlewood Forest	✓		400.1 hectares (989 acres)	PP	Silverstone; 52.081°N 0.949°W; SP 721 430	NCR	Map	Citation	This is ancient semi-natural woodlands with many trees which are mature or over-mature, especially pedunculate oaks. There are also many ash trees and a scattering of silver birches and aspens. The oaks have nationally rare and nationally uncommon beetles, and there are locally rare lichens.
Wollaston Meadows	Wollaston Meadows	✓		14.3 hectares (35 acres)	NO	Wellingborough; 52.274°N 0.686°W; SP 897 648		Map	Citation	This site on the banks of the River Nene is composed of two species-rich hay fields. Flora include meadow foxtail, crested dog's-tail and red fescue. Overgrown hedges and ditches provide habitats for birds, small mammals and invertebrates.
Yardley Chase	Yardley Chase	✓		357.6 hectares (884 acres)	PP	Yardley Hastings; 52.181°N 0.763°W; SP 846 543		Map	Citation	The Chase has diverse semi-natural habitats, and its value for invertebrates has been enhanced by military use of the site, which has resulted in a long absence of intensive agriculture. There is woodland and unimproved grassland, and 30 breeding butterfly species have been recorded.

== See also ==
- List of Local Nature Reserves in Northamptonshire
- Wildlife Trust for Bedfordshire, Cambridgeshire and Northamptonshire

== Sources ==
- Ratcliffe, Derek, ed. (1977). A Nature Conservation Review. Vol. 2. Cambridge, UK: Cambridge University Press. ISBN 0521-21403-3.
