= Mantles Heath =

Protected area in Northamptonshire, England

Coordinates: 52.192°N 1.127°W

- Site of Special Scientific Interest
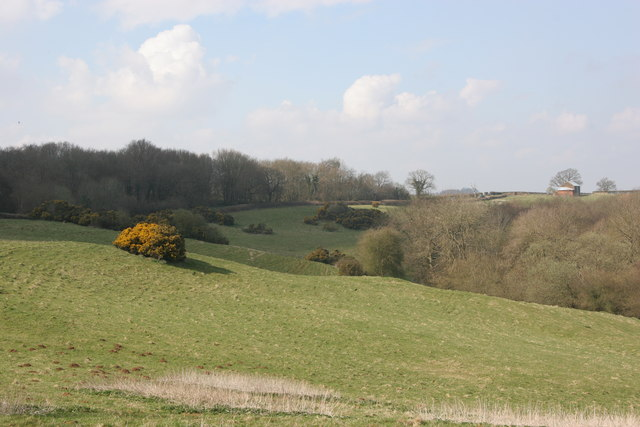
- Location of Mantles Heath.
- Area of search: Northamptonshire
- Grid reference: SP 597 552
- Interest: Biological
- Area: 13.7 hectares
- Notification date: 1984
- Location map: Magic Map

Mantles Heath is a 13.7-hectare (34-acre) biological Site of Special Scientific Interest south of Daventry in Northamptonshire.

Most of this woodland site is on acid soil, but the western part is on calcareous and poorly drained clay, and has a diverse flora. Locally uncommon plants include wood vetch, opposite-leaved golden-saxifrage and slender St John’s wort.

There is access from Preston Capes by the Knightley Way long distance footpath.
