= Short Wood and Southwick Wood =

Nature reserve in Northamptonshire, England

Coordinates: 52.511°N 0.505°W

Short Wood
- Site of Special Scientific Interest
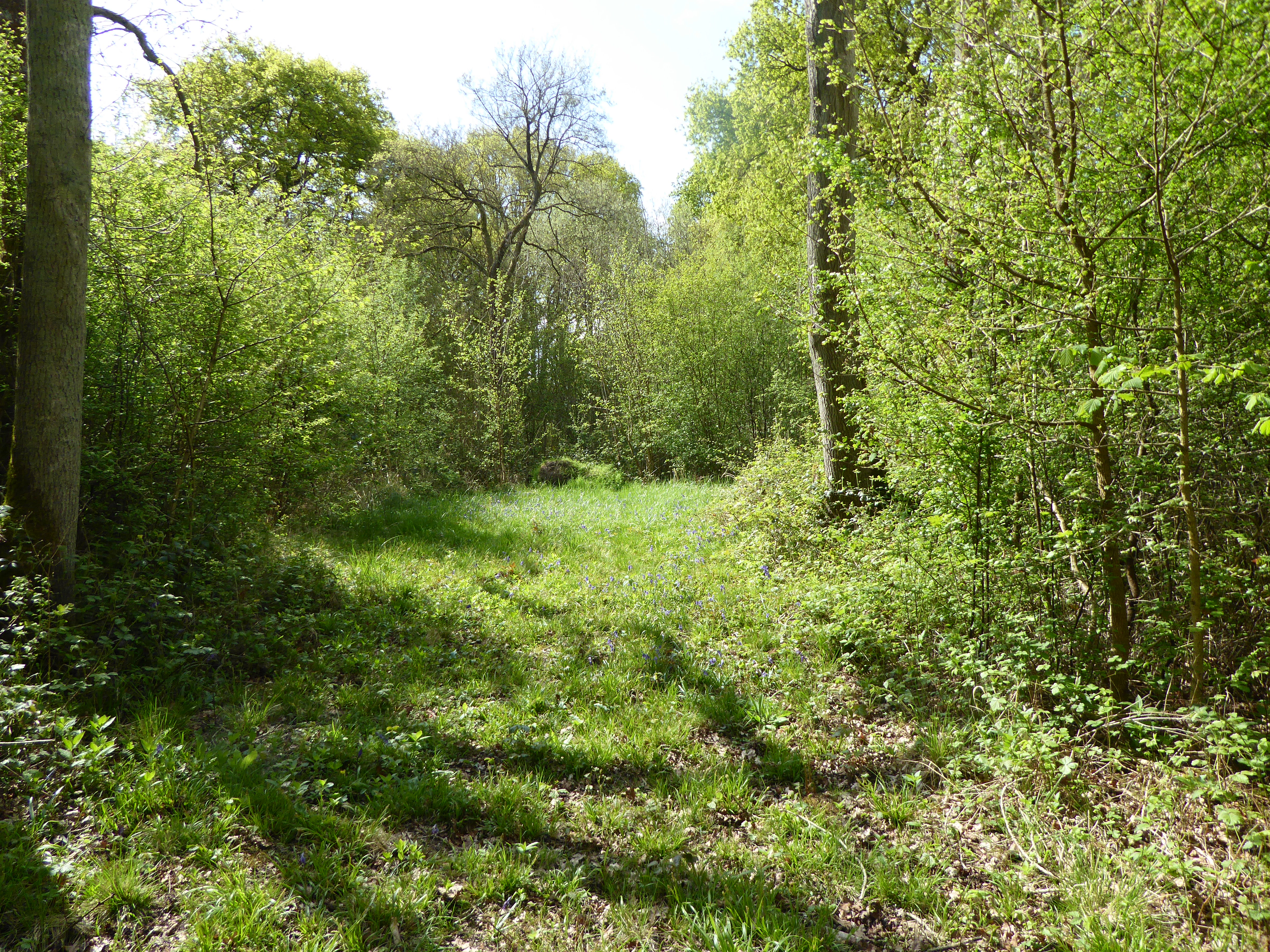
- Location of Short Wood.
- Area of search: Northamptonshire
- Grid reference: TL 015 913
- Interest: Biological
- Area: 25.3 hectares
- Notification date: 1985
- Location map: Magic Map

Short Wood and Southwick Wood is a 54.7-hectare (135-acre) nature reserve north-west of Oundle in Northamptonshire. It is managed by the Wildlife Trust for Bedfordshire, Cambridgeshire and Northamptonshire. Short Wood is a 25.3-hectare (63-acre) biological Site of Special Scientific Interest.

The site is a small remnant of the medieval royal hunting Rockingham Forest. Short Wood is ancient semi-natural woodland with the dominant trees being ash and pedunculate oak. Flora include several local rarities such as wood speedwell, bird's nest orchid and greater butterfly orchid. Southwick Wood lost its elms in the late 1960s due to Dutch elm disease, and it now has oak, ash, field maple and hazel.

There is access from the road between Southwick and Glapthorn, which passes between the two woods.
