= King's Cliffe Banks =

Biological Site of Special Scientific Interest

Coordinates: 52.564°N 0.505°W

- Site of Special Scientific Interest
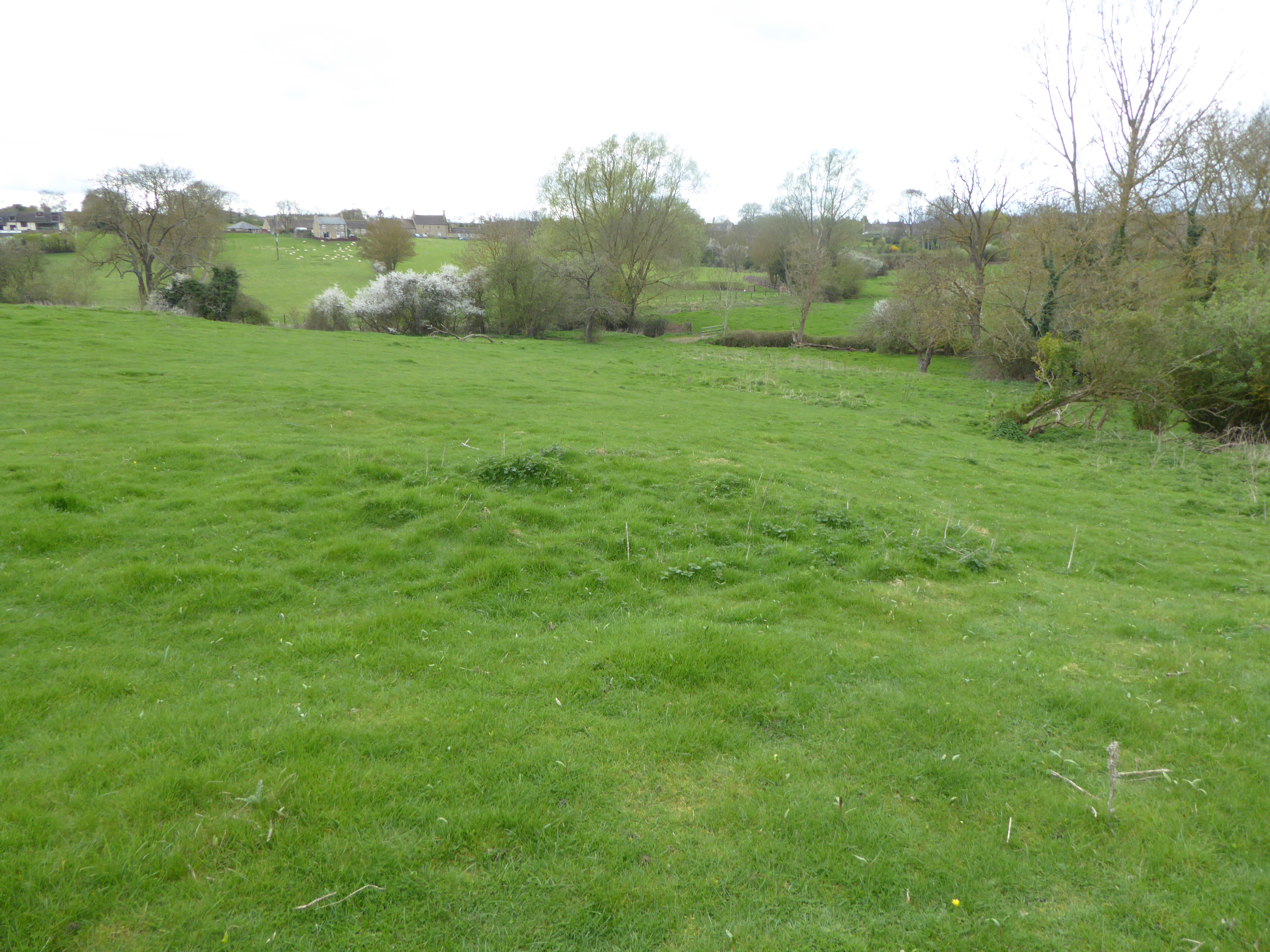
- Location of King's Cliffe Banks.
- Area of search: Northamptonshire
- Grid reference: TL 014 972
- Interest: Biological
- Area: 7.7 hectares
- Notification date: 1992
- Location map: Magic Map

King's Cliffe Banks is a 7.7-hectare (19-acre) biological Site of Special Scientific Interest in King's Cliffe in Northamptonshire.

This former quarry has undulating calcareous grassland which is grazed by rabbits and cattle. It has a rich variety of flora, including sheep's fescue, dwarf thistle, mouse-ear hawkweed, wild thyme and common rock-rose. There are many bryophytes and lichens.

There is access to the site by a footpath from Bridge Street.
