= Birch Spinney and Mawsley Marsh =

Site of Special Scientific Interest in Northamptonshire, England

Coordinates: 52.382°N 0.812°W

- Site of Special Scientific Interest
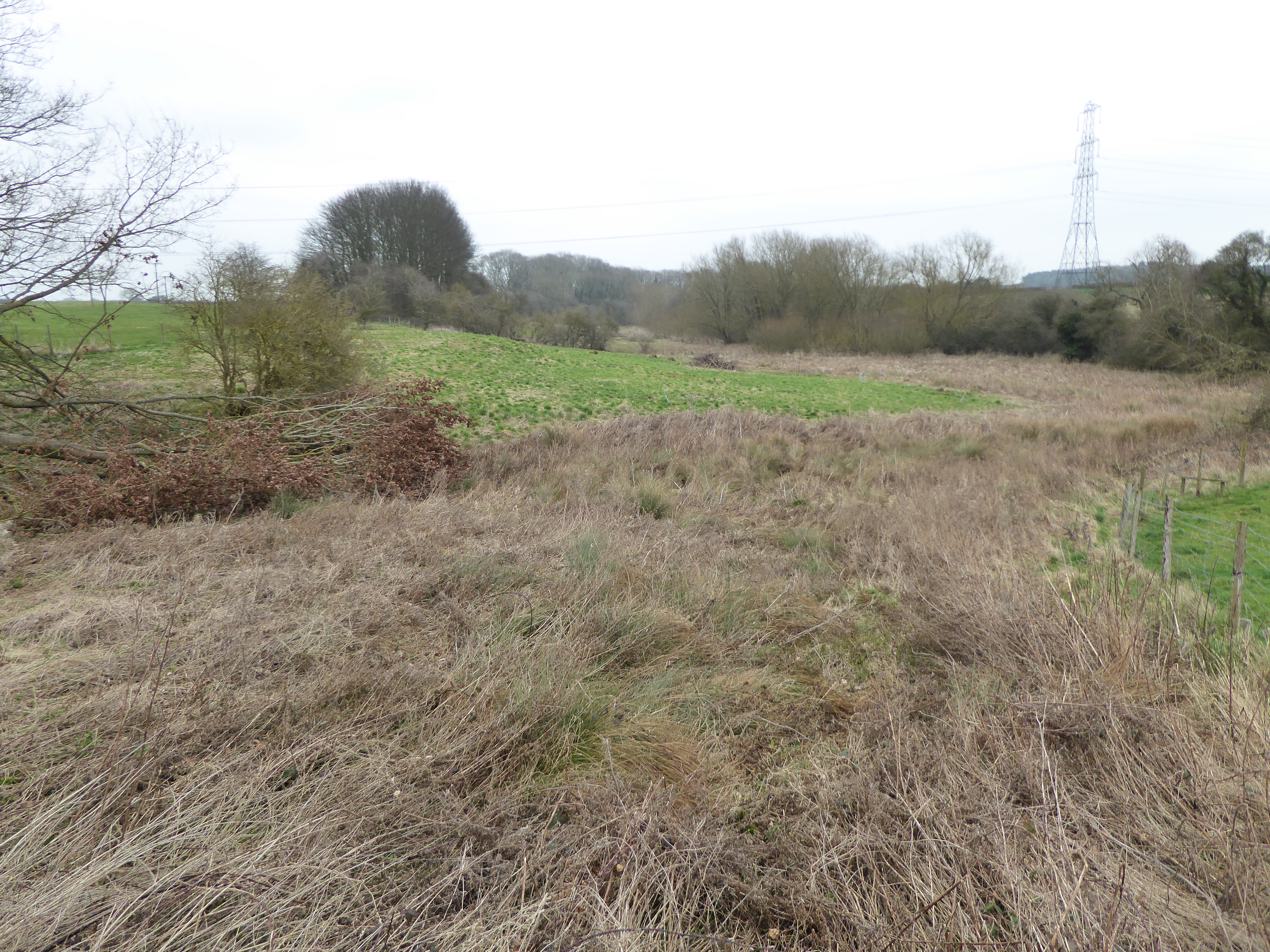
- Mawsley Marsh
- Location of Birch Spinney and Mawsley Marsh.
- Area of search: Northamptonshire
- Grid reference: SP 809 766
- Interest: Biological
- Area: 12.3 hectares
- Notification date: 1984
- Location map: Magic Map

Birch Spinney and Mawsley Marsh is a 12.3-hectare (30-acre) biological Site of Special Scientific Interest north-west of Broughton in Northamptonshire.

Birch Spinney is a rare type of ash-maple woodland partly on peat. Mawsley Marsh is described by Natural England as "one of the finest remaining Northamptonshire marshes", with flora including blunt-flowered rush, jointed rush and water horsetail. There is also a stretch of a dismantled railway line.

There is no access to the site but a footpath from Great Cransley (not Mawsley) runs along the boundary of Mawsley Marsh.
