= Aldwincle Marsh =

Protected area in Northamptonshire, England

Coordinates: 52.416°N 0.525°W

- Site of Special Scientific Interest
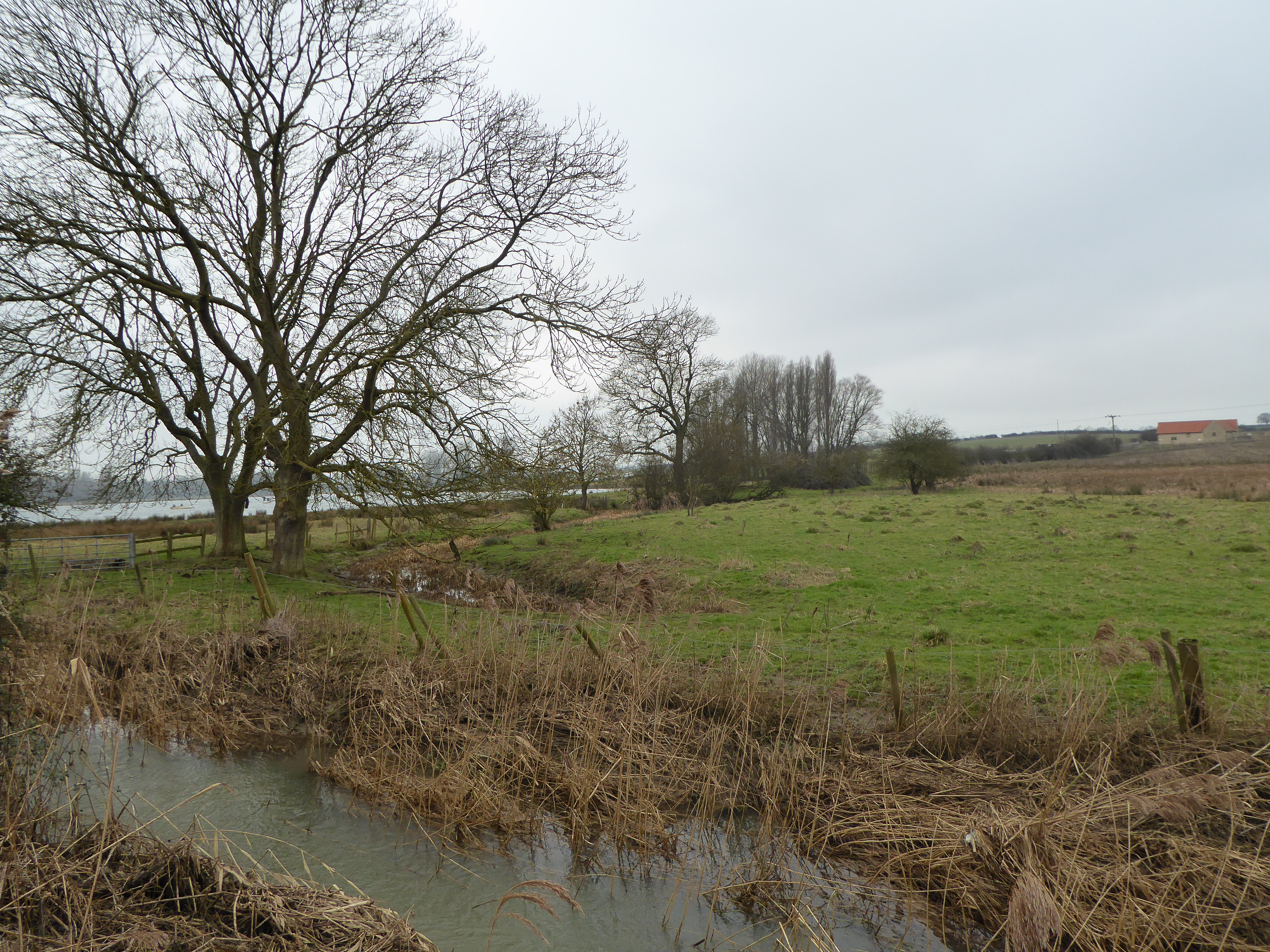
- Location of Aldwincle Marsh.
- Area of search: Northamptonshire
- Grid reference: TL 004 807
- Interest: Biological
- Area: 2.0 hectares
- Notification date: 1984
- Location map: Magic Map

Aldwincle Marsh is a 2-hectare (4.9-acre) biological Site of Special Scientific Interest north of Thrapston in Northamptonshire.

This marsh and fen on shallow peat is formed by seepage from the boundary between clay and limestone. Plants in wet areas include blunt-flowered rush, marsh pennywort, wild angelica and Menyanthes trifoliata, a rare species of bogbean. Drier areas have grasses and herbs which attract butterflies and dragonflies. The site includes a stretch of Harpers Brook.

The site is private land with no public access, but the Nene Way runs along its eastern boundary.
