= Old Sulehay Forest =

Nature reserve in Northamptonshire, England

Coordinates: 52.574°N 0.434°W

- Site of Special Scientific Interest
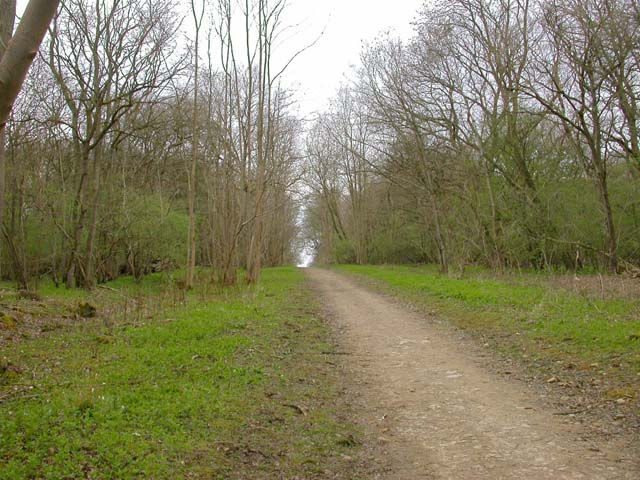
- Location of Old Sulehay Forest.
- Area of search: Northamptonshire
- Grid reference: TL 062 985
- Interest: Biological
- Area: 34.8 hectares
- Notification date: 1984
- Location map: Magic Map

Old Sulehay Forest is a 34.8-hectare (86-acre) biological Site of Special Scientific Interest east of King's Cliffe in Northamptonshire. It is part of the 85-hectare (210-acre) Old Sulehay nature reserve, which is managed by the Wildlife Trust for Bedfordshire, Cambridgeshire and Northamptonshire.

This ancient forest has a number of different soil conditions and coppice types, and the ground flora is diverse. Abundant herbs include dog's mercury, bracken, bramble, ramsons, wood anemone and bluebells.

There is access by footpaths from Wansford Road.
