= Banhaw, Spring and Blackthorn's Woods =

Woodlands in Northamptonshire, England

Coordinates: 52.48°N 0.571°W

- Site of Special Scientific Interest
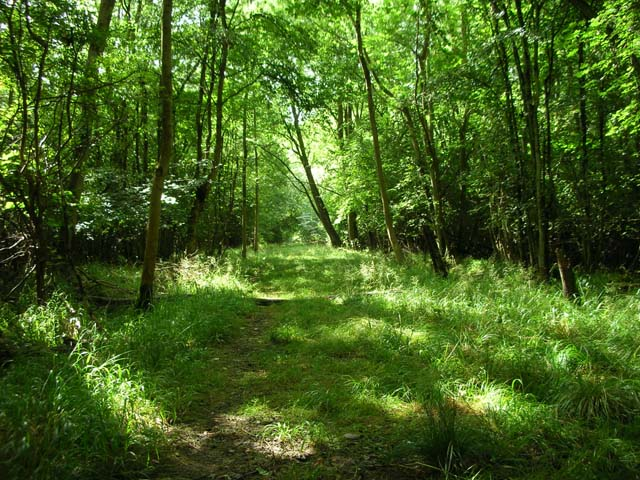
- Footpath through Banhaw Wood
- Location of Banhaw, Spring and Blackthorn's Woods.
- Area of search: Northamptonshire
- Grid reference: SP 971 878
- Interest: Biological
- Area: 123.4 hectares
- Notification date: 1986
- Location map: Magic Map

Banhaw, Spring and Blackthorn's Woods is a 123.4-hectare (305-acre) biological Site of Special Scientific Interest east of Corby in Northamptonshire.

These woods are one of the largest remnants of the ancient Royal Forest of Rockingham. They are mainly ash and pedunculate oak on wet calcareous clay soils. The ground flora is diverse, and there are grasses such as tufted hair-grass, rough meadow-grass and wood melick.

There is access to Banhaw Wood by a footpath from Lower Benefield.
