= Plumpton Pasture =

Biological SSSI near Towcester, Northamptonshire

Coordinates: 52.128°N 1.133°W

- Site of Special Scientific Interest
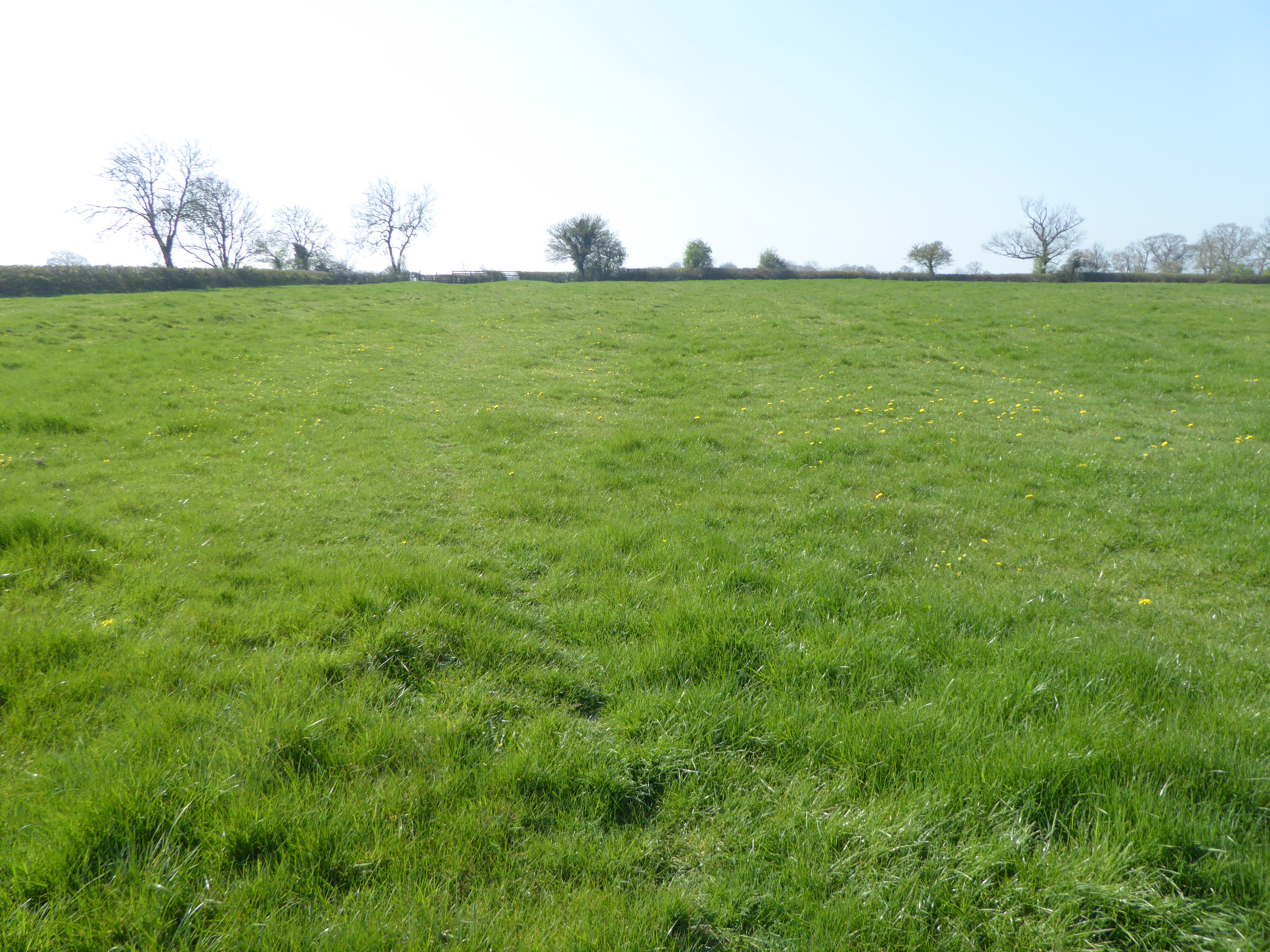
- Location of Plumpton Pasture.
- Area of search: Northamptonshire
- Grid reference: SP 594 480
- Interest: Biological
- Area: 3.6 hectares
- Notification date: 1985
- Location map: Magic Map

Plumpton Pasture is a 3.6-hectare (8.9-acre) biological Site of Special Scientific Interest east of Towcester in Northamptonshire.

There are medieval ridge and furrows on this unimproved meadow on clay. The drier ridge tops have many herbs, while the damp furrows are dominated by creeping bent and Yorkshire fog grasses. There are also mature hedges and a small pond.

The site is private land with no public access.
