= Calender Meadows =

Protected area in Northamptonshire, England

Coordinates: 52.368°N 0.995°W

- Site of Special Scientific Interest
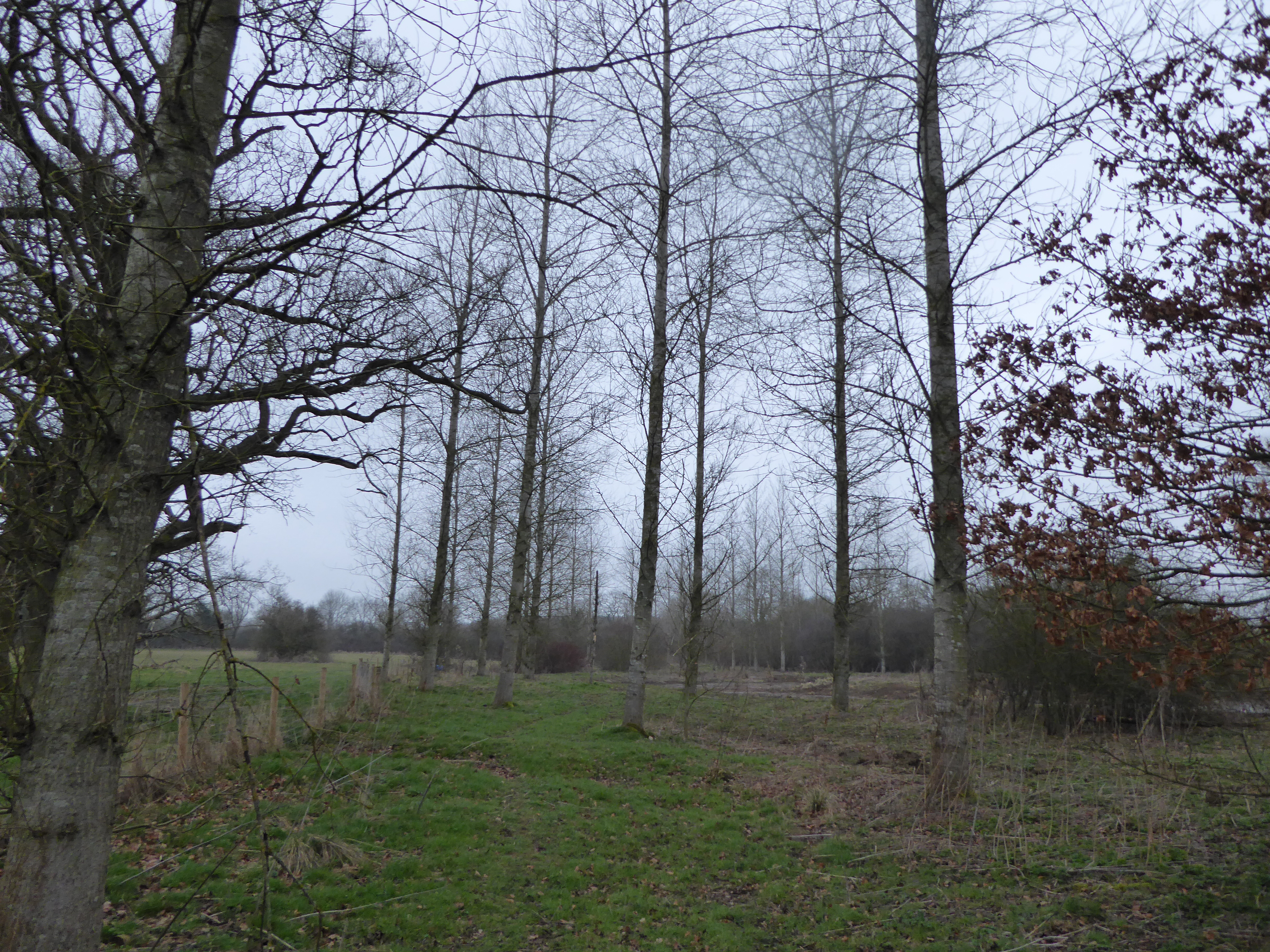
- Location of Calender Meadows.
- Area of search: Northamptonshire
- Grid reference: SP 685 749
- Interest: Biological
- Area: 3.1 hectares
- Notification date: 2012
- Location map: Magic Map

Calender Meadows is a 3.1-hectare (7.7-acre) biological Site of Special Scientific Interest north of Guilsborough in Northamptonshire.

This is described by Natural England as "a nationally important site for its lowland unimproved neutral grassland". It has a wide variety of native herbs and grasses. There are herbs such as lady's bedstraw, meadow vetchling and common bird's-foot trefoil, and grasses include red fescue, sweet vernal-grass and false oat-grass.

The site is private land with no public access.
