= Helmdon Disused Railway =

Protected area in Northamptonshire, England

Coordinates: 52.067°N 1.143°W

- Site of Special Scientific Interest
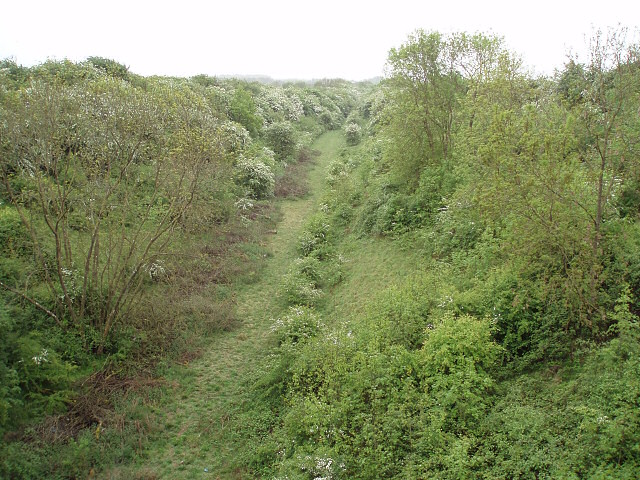
- Location of Helmdon Disused Railway.
- Area of search: Northamptonshire
- Grid reference: SP 588 412
- Interest: Biological
- Area: 16.6 hectares
- Notification date: 1990
- Location map: Magic Map

Helmdon Disused Railway is a 16.6-hectare (41-acre) linear biological Site of Special Scientific Interest between Helmdon and Brackley in Northamptonshire.

This site is the former embankment and cutting of the Great Central Railway, which closed in 1966. It is Jurassic grassland, and limestone spoil heaps have a very diverse floral community. Butterflies include the nationally scarce wood white and five nationally declining species. It is the only location in the county for the small blue butterfly.

A public footpath runs along the site.

The route of the HS2 High Speed railway crosses the southern end of the site.
