= Titchmarsh Meadow =

Protected area in Northamptonshire, England

Coordinates: 52.405°N 0.487°W

- Site of Special Scientific Interest
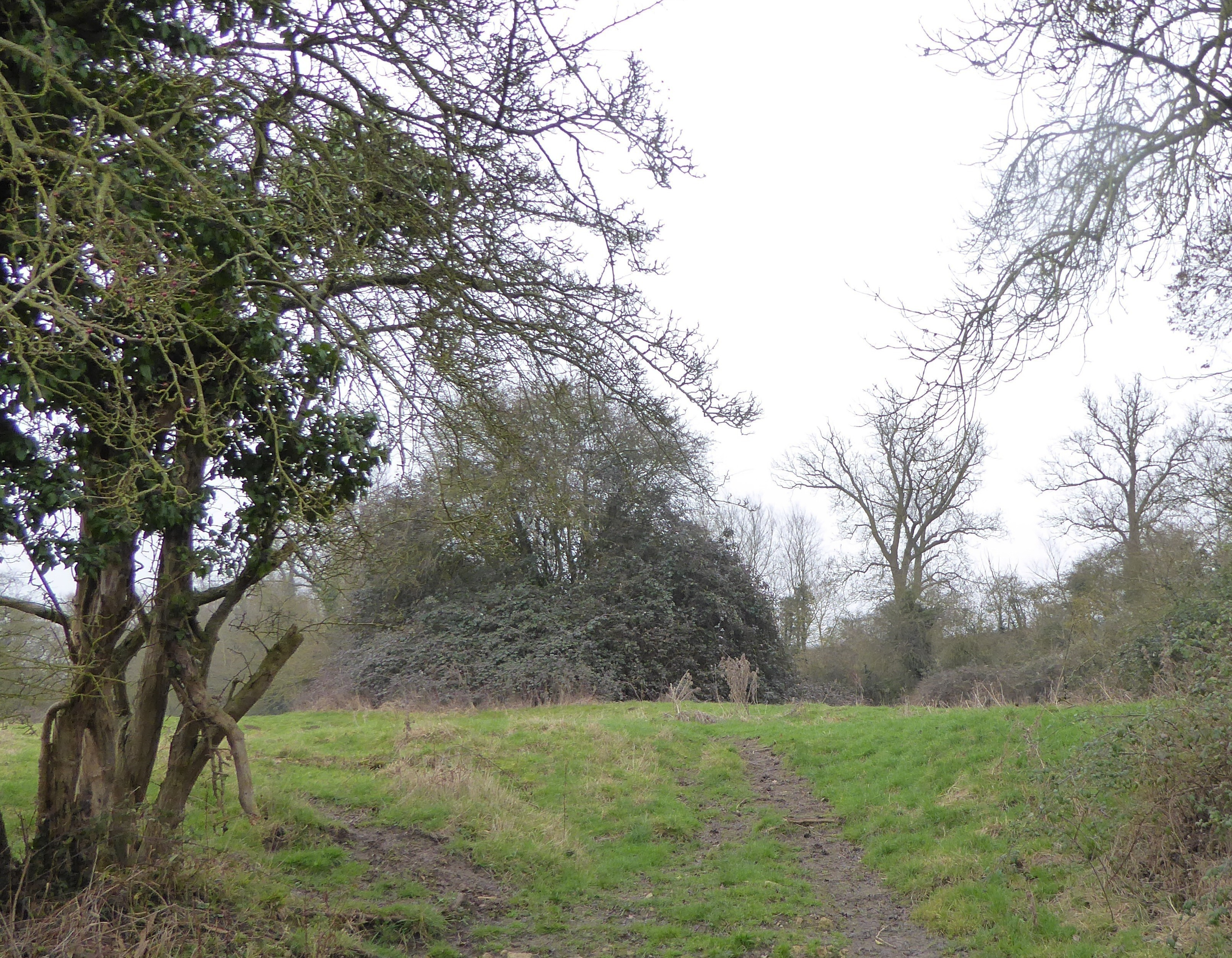
- Location of Titchmarsh Meadow.
- Area of search: Northamptonshire
- Grid reference: TL 030 796
- Interest: Biological
- Area: 2.2 hectares
- Notification date: 1986
- Location map: Magic Map

Titchmarsh Meadow is a 2.2-hectare (5.4-acre) biological Site of Special Scientific Interest north-east of Titchmarsh in Northamptonshire.

This poorly drained field has a rich variety of plant species, including greater bird's-foot-trefoil, southern marsh-orchid and pepper saxifrage. A medieval fish pond which has been drained has marsh vegetation. Hedges, streams and ditches provide a valuable habitat for invertebrates and small mammals.

The site is private land with no public access.
