= Irchester Old Lodge Pit =

Coordinates: 52.275°N 0.661°W

- Site of Special Scientific Interest
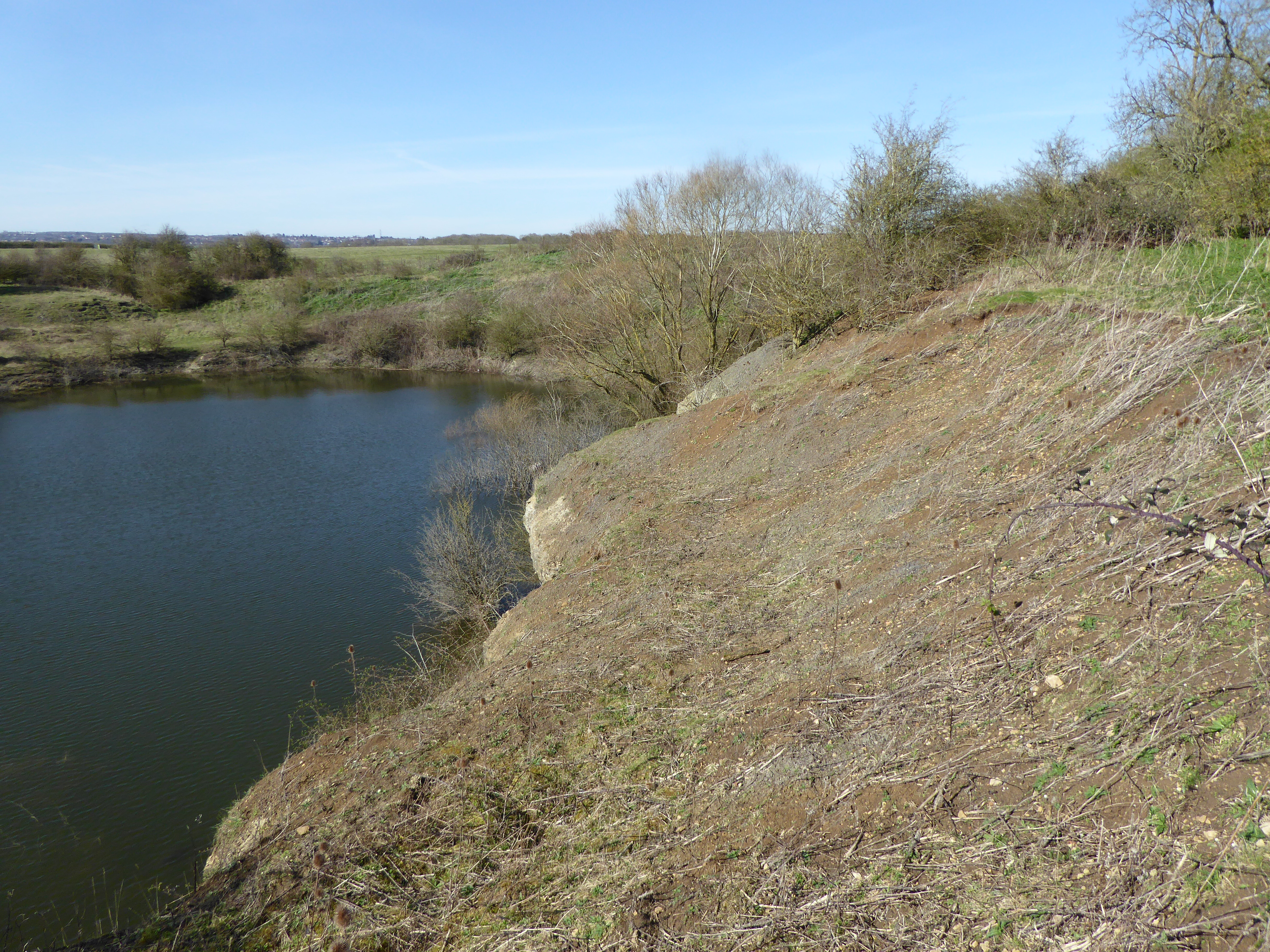
- Location of Irchester Old Lodge Pit.
- Area of search: Northamptonshire
- Grid reference: SP 914 649
- Interest: Geological
- Area: 0.4 hectares
- Notification date: 1989
- Location map: Magic Map

Irchester Old Lodge Pit is a 0.4-hectare (0.99-acre) geological Site of Special Scientific Interest south of Wellingborough in Northamptonshire. It is a Geological Conservation Review site.

This is described by Natural England as "a key Middle Jurassic locality important for the information it yields on both Bathonian environments and stratigraphy". It exposes White Limestone which has many fossils, especially molluscs.

The site is private land with no public access.
