= Wakerley Spinney =

Biological site

Coordinates: 52.577°N 0.577°W

- Site of Special Scientific Interest
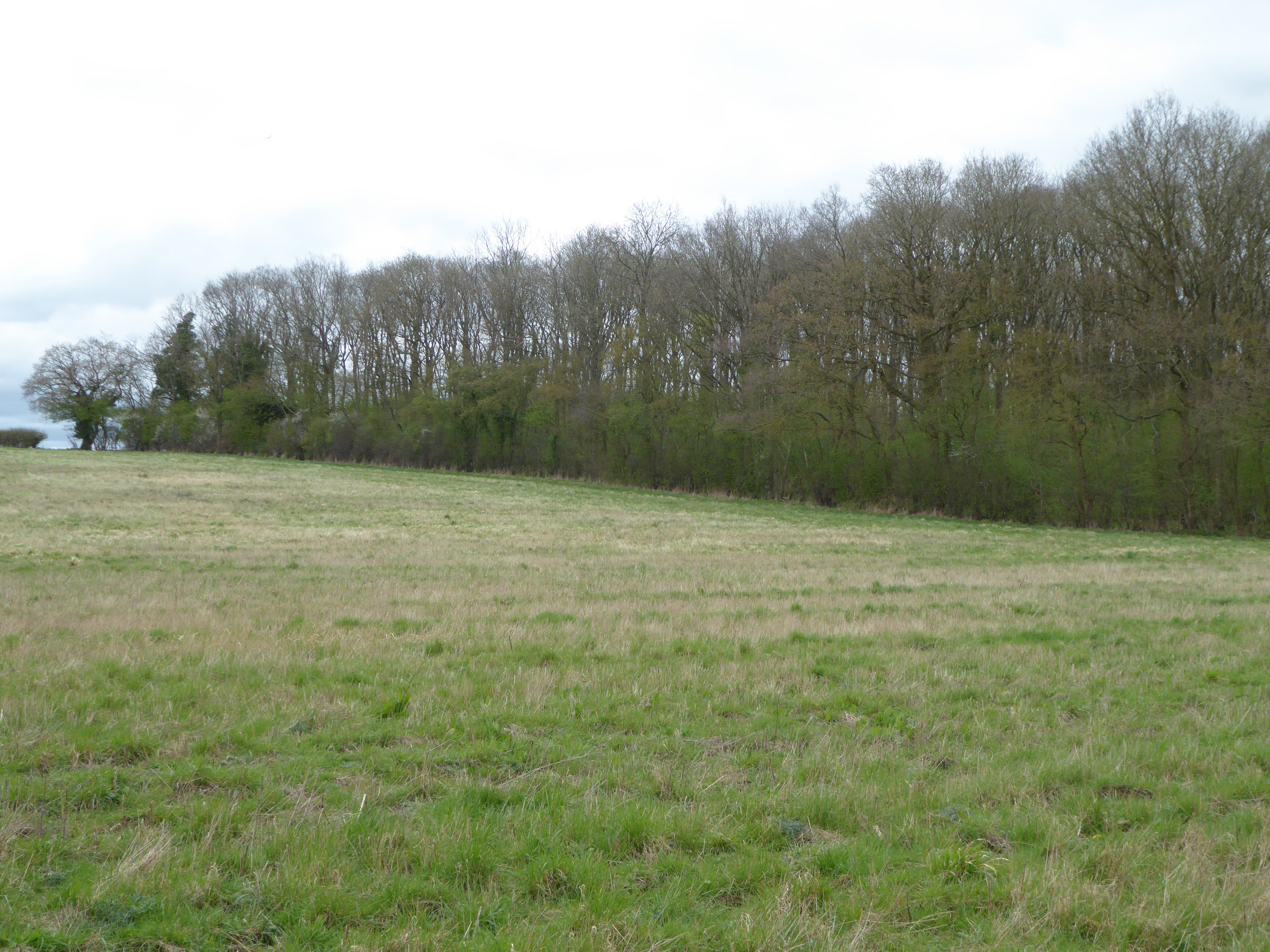
- Location of Wakerley Spinney.
- Area of search: Northamptonshire
- Grid reference: SP 965 986
- Interest: Biological
- Area: 4.4 hectares
- Notification date: 1983
- Location map: Magic Map

Wakerley Spinney is a 4.4-hectare (11-acre) biological Site of Special Scientific Interest west of King's Cliffe in Northamptonshire.

This is a remnant of the ancient Royal Forest of Rockingham, and it has broadleaved woodland and semi-natural grassland. The most common trees are pedunculate oak, ash, sycamore and downy birch. Locally uncommon flowering plants include woodruff, violet helleborine and fly orchid.

The site is private land with no public access.
