= Dungee Corner Meadow =

Protected area in Northamptonshire, England

Coordinates: 52.231°N 0.643°W

- Site of Special Scientific Interest
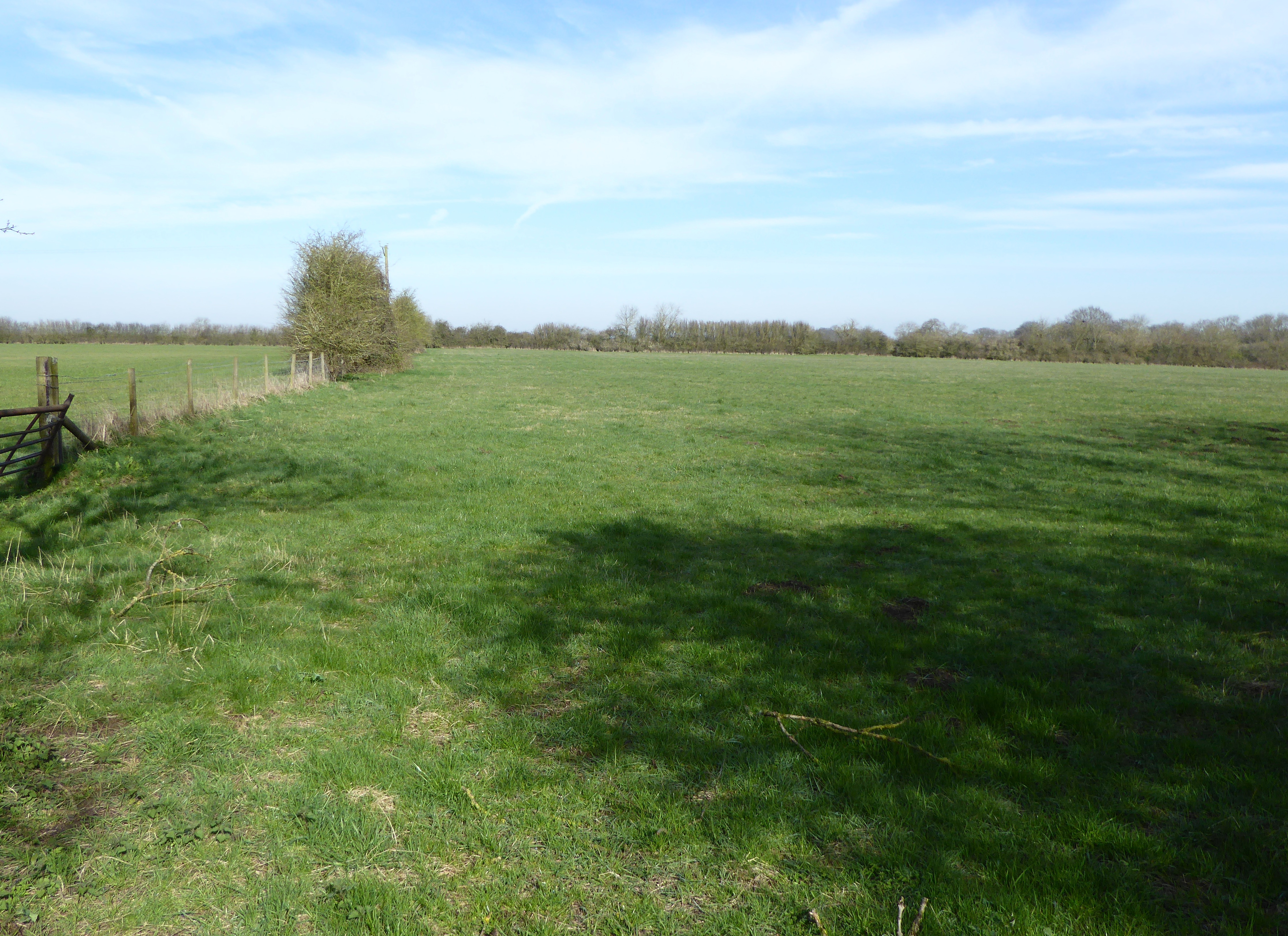
- Location of Dungee Corner Meadow.
- Area of search: Northamptonshire
- Grid reference: SP 927 600
- Interest: Biological
- Area: 5.1 hectares
- Notification date: 1985
- Location map: Magic Map

Dungee Corner Meadow is a 5.1-hectare (13-acre) biological Site of Special Scientific Interest east of Bozeat in Northamptonshire.

This well drained hay meadow on boulder clay is traditionally managed, and no artificial fertilisers or herbicides have been used, so it has a diverse flora. More than twenty grass species have been recorded, including sweet vernal, Yorkshire fog, sheep's fescue, quaking grass and crested dog's-tail. There is also a population of the locally rare green-winged orchid.

The site is private land with no public access.
