= Syresham Marshy Meadows =

Protected area in Northamptonshire, England

Coordinates: 52.078°N 1.067°W

- Site of Special Scientific Interest
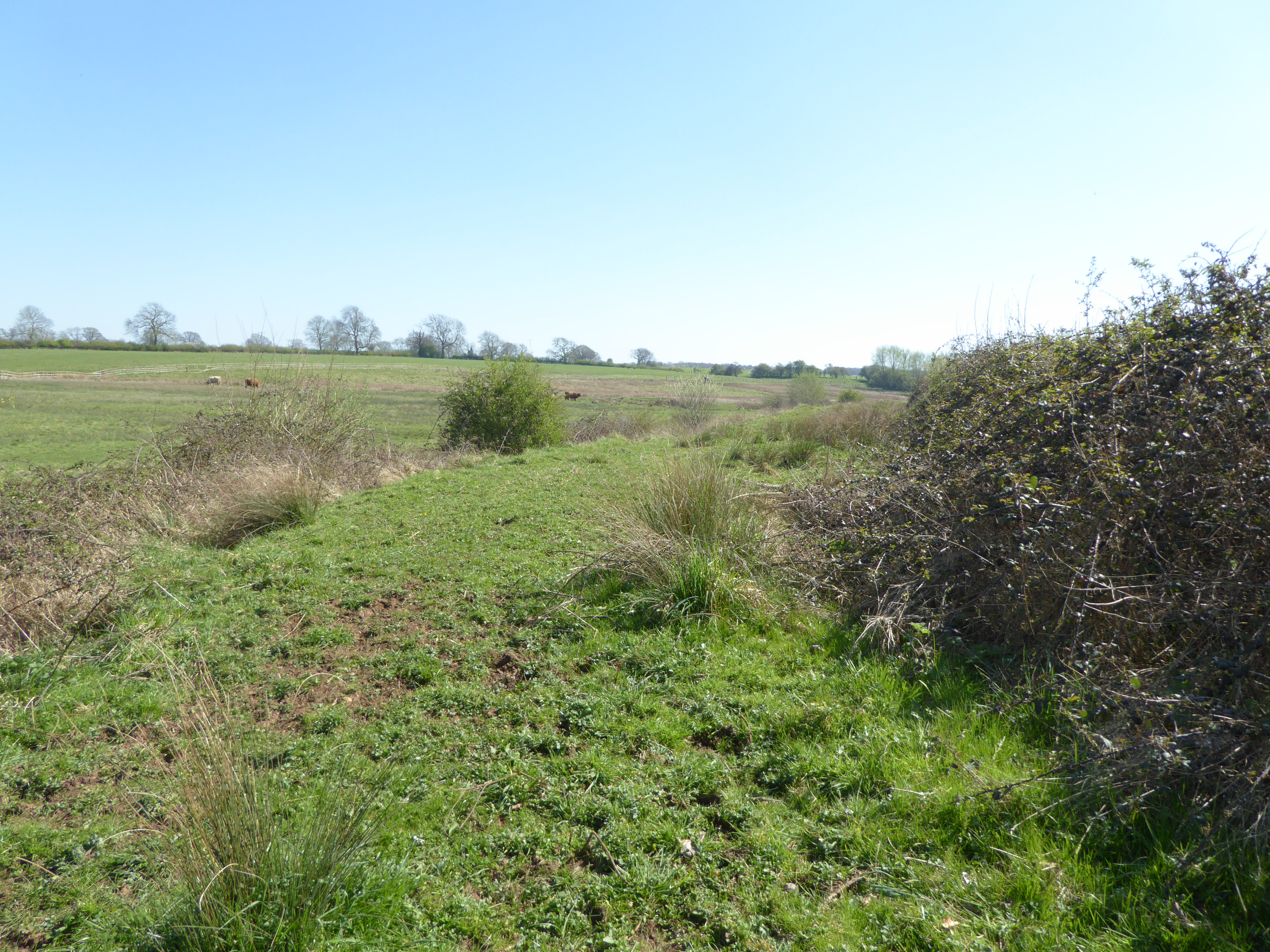
- Location of Syresham Marshy Meadows.
- Area of search: Northamptonshire
- Grid reference: SP 640 425
- Interest: Biological
- Area: 17.8 hectares
- Notification date: 1985
- Location map: Magic Map

Syresham Marshy Meadows is a 17.8-hectare (44-acre) biological Site of Special Scientific Interest west of Silverstone in Northamptonshire.

This site consists of two nearby areas of wetland in valleys which drain into the River Great Ouse. The northern one is a mire on shallow peat, and the southern one is agriculturally unimproved grassland and marsh on diverse soils, which has over a hundred flowering plant species.

A footpath leads into the northern area, but there is no public access to the southern one.
