= Sudborough Green Lodge Meadows =

Protected area in Northamptonshire, England

Coordinates: 52.447°N 0.573°W

- Site of Special Scientific Interest
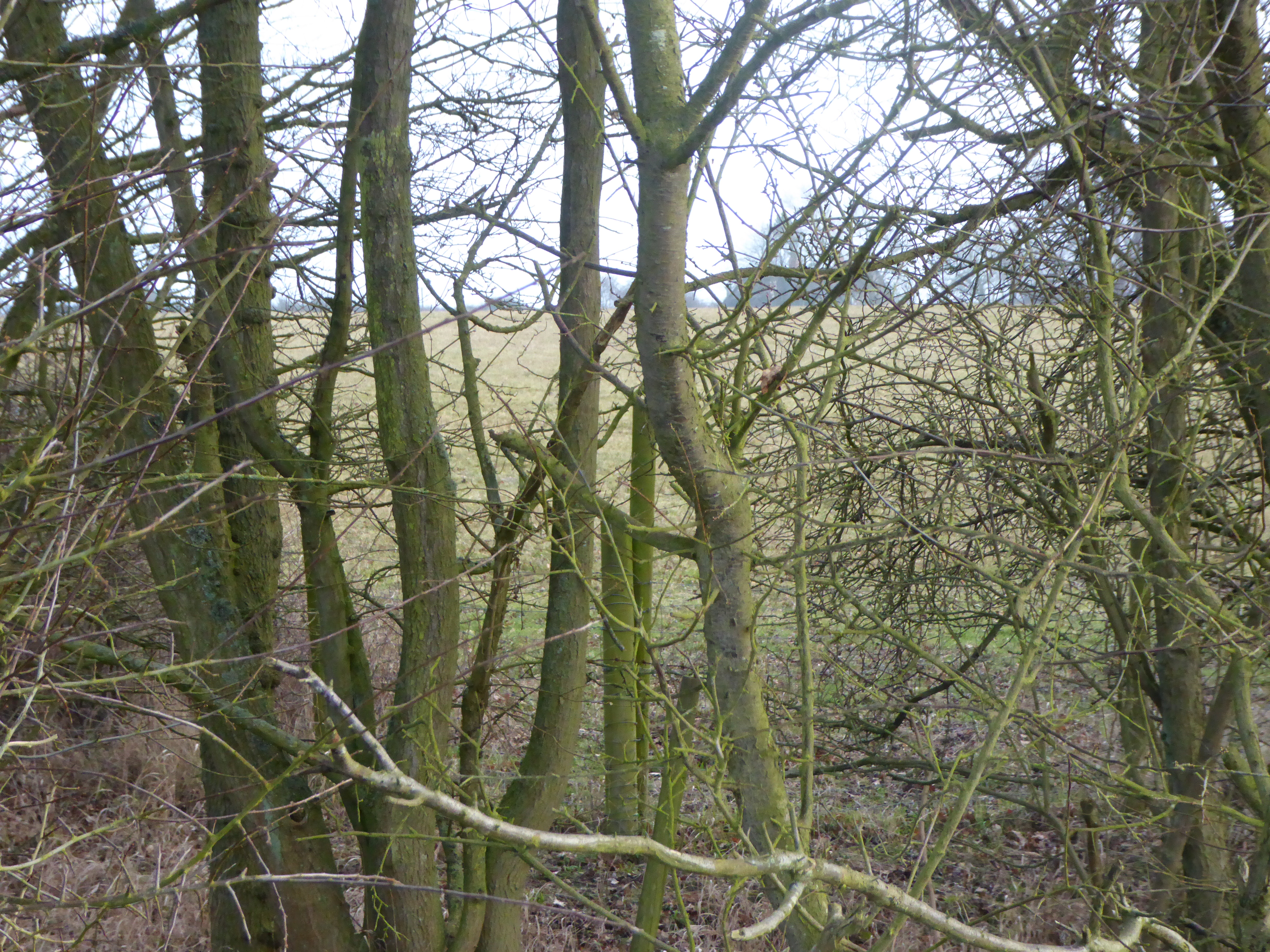
- Location of Sudborough Green Lodge Meadows.
- Area of search: Northamptonshire
- Grid reference: SP 970 841
- Interest: Biological
- Area: 13.6 hectares
- Notification date: 1985
- Location map: Magic Map

Sudborough Green Lodge Meadows is a 13.6-hectare (34-acre) biological Site of Special Scientific Interest Northamptonshire. This is a 'key site' as defined by A Nature Conservation Review, although it is not listed in the book as it was first designated after its publication in 1977.

This site consists of two hay meadows, one of which is agriculturally unimproved and has large areas of medieval ridge and furrow. An experiment in trying to create attractive grasslands in the other field has potential for scientific research. Ponds, scrub, willow trees, hedgerows and wild pear trees add to the ecological value.

The site is private land with no public access.
