= Mill Crook =

Nature reserve in Northamptonshire, England

Coordinates: 52.11°N 0.872°W

- Site of Special Scientific Interest
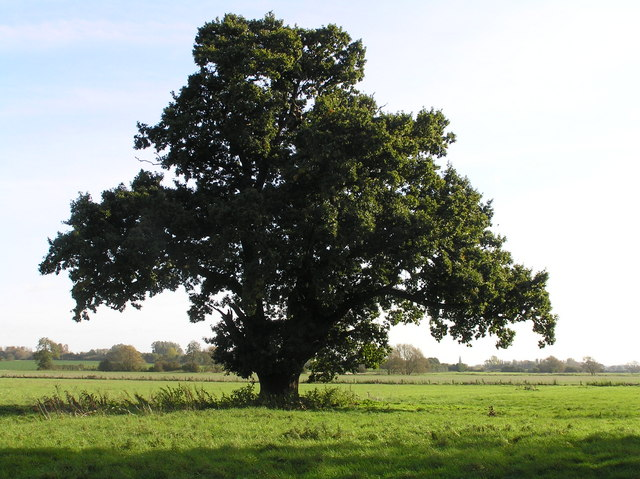
- Location of Mill Crook.
- Area of search: Northamptonshire
- Grid reference: SP 773 463
- Interest: Biological
- Area: 5.9 hectares
- Notification date: 1989
- Location map: Magic Map

Mill Crook is a 5.9-hectare (15-acre) biological Site of Special Scientific Interest east of Towcester in Northamptonshire. Mill Crook and Grafton Regis Meadow are a 7.9-hectare (20-acre) nature reserve managed by the Wildlife Trust for Bedfordshire, Cambridgeshire and Northamptonshire.

Signs of medieval ridge and furrow still survive on these traditionally managed hay meadows in Mill Crook on the bank of the River Tove. It has diverse flora, with grasses such as meadow foxtail and sweet vernal-grass, and herbs including great burnet and ribwort plantain.

Visitors are advised to contact the Northamptonshire office of the Wildlife Trust for advice on access.
