= Alder Wood and Meadow =

Protected area in England

Coordinates: 52.453°N 0.769°W

- Site of Special Scientific Interest
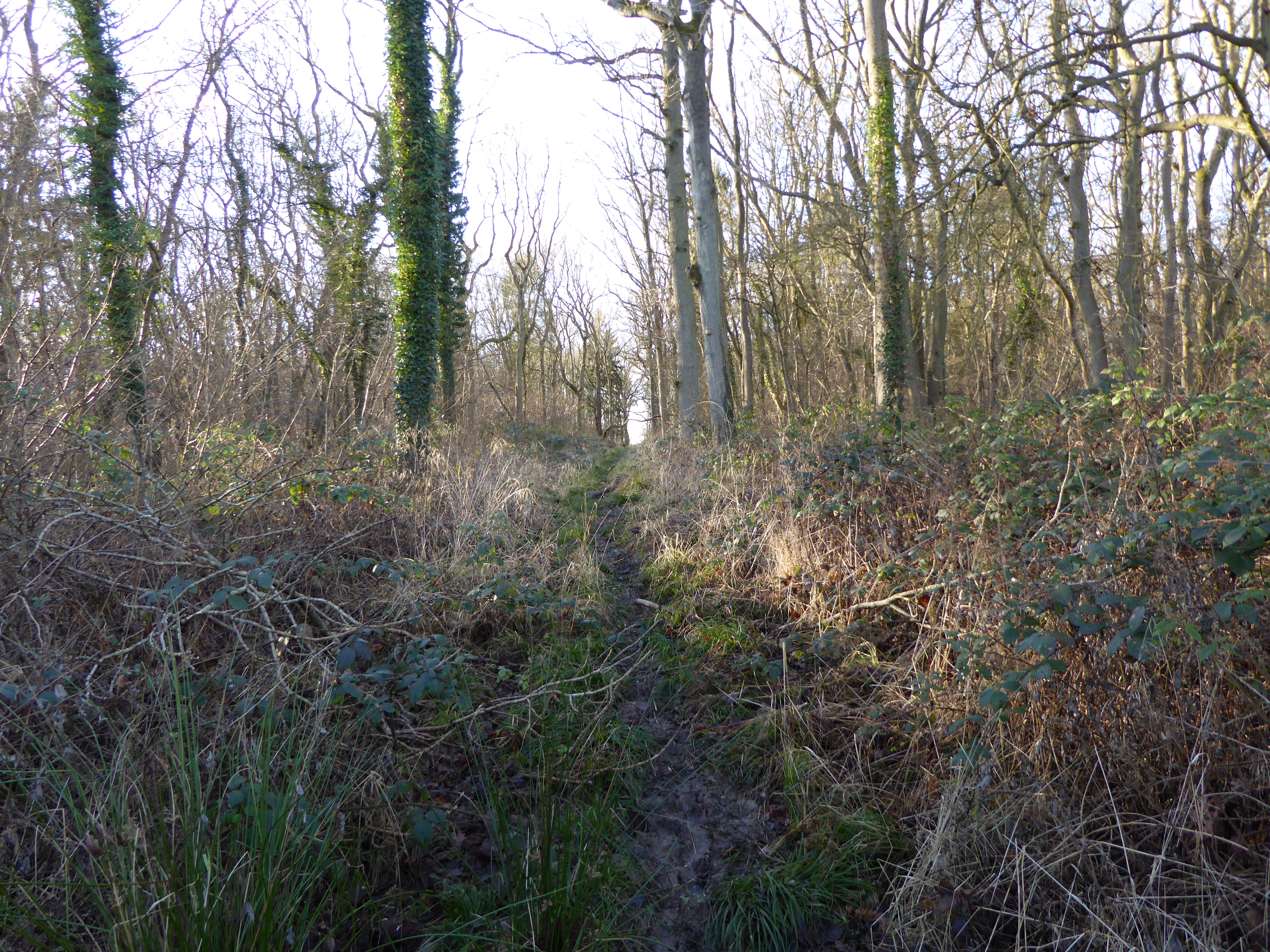
- Location of Alder Wood and Meadow.
- Area of search: Northamptonshire
- Grid reference: SP 837 846
- Interest: Biological
- Area: 13.2 hectares
- Notification date: 1985
- Location map: Magic Map

Alder Wood and Meadow is a 13.2-hectare (33-acre) biological Site of Special Scientific Interest south-west of Corby in Northamptonshire.

The semi-natural ancient broadleaved woodland is a surviving fragment of the Royal Forest of Rockingham. It is mainly ash, and the ground flora on base rich soil includes tufted hair-grass, dog's mercury and enchanter's nightshade. The meadow is agriculturally unimproved, and it has surviving medieval ridge and furrow.

There is access by a footpath from Rushton.
