= Everdon Stubbs =

Coordinates: 52.205°N 1.115°W

- Site of Special Scientific Interest
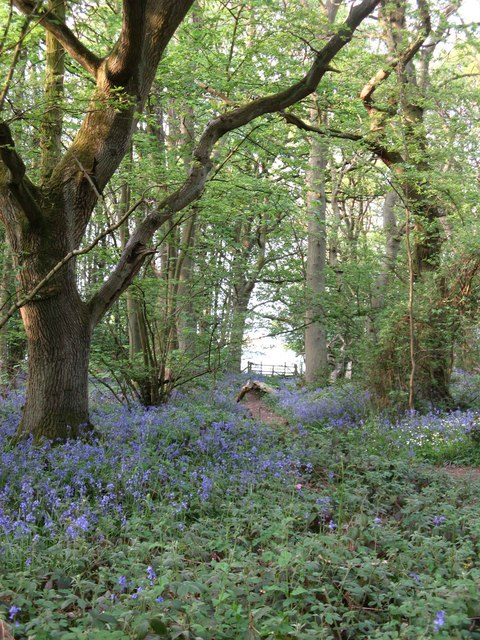
- Location of Everdon Stubbs.
- Area of search: Northamptonshire
- Grid reference: SP 605 566
- Interest: Biological
- Area: 29.5 hectares
- Notification date: 1984
- Location map: Magic Map

Everdon Stubbs is a 29.5-hectare (73-acre) biological Site of Special Scientific Interest south-east of Everdon in Northamptonshire. It is owned and managed by the Woodland Trust.

This woodland site has areas of acidic free-draining soil, and other damper areas. It is described by Natural England as an important site for fungi, and there is a diverse range of breeding birds. There are locally uncommon plants such as wild daffodil, orpine and bitter vetch.

There is access from Stubbs Road, which goes through the site.
