= Hardwick Lodge Meadow =

Protected area in Northamptonshire, England

Coordinates: 52.324°N 0.777°W

- Site of Special Scientific Interest
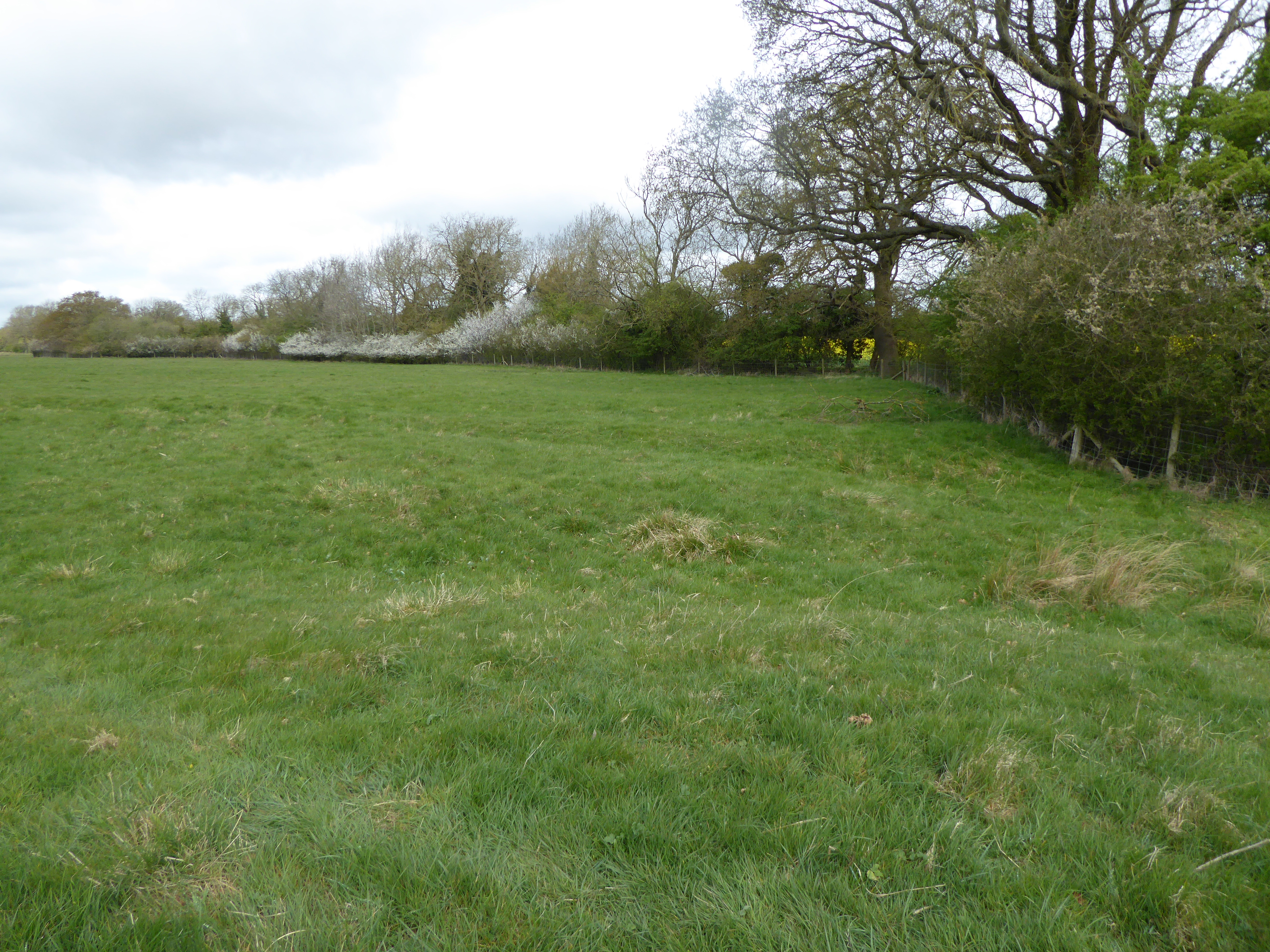
- Location of Hardwick Lodge Meadow.
- Area of search: Northamptonshire
- Grid reference: SP 834 702
- Interest: Biological
- Area: 10.0 hectares
- Notification date: 1985
- Location map: Magic Map

Hardwick Lodge Meadow is a 10 hectare biological Site of Special Scientific Interest north-west of Wellingborough in Northamptonshire.

This unimproved grassland on boulder clay has a rich variety of flora, including many rare in the county. Crested hair-grass and salad burnet are found in drier parts, and a marshy area next to a stream has common spotted-orchid and the only population in Northamptonshire of heath spotted-orchid.

There is access by a footpath which crosses the field.
