= Racecourse Farm Fields =

Protected area in Northamptonshire, England

Coordinates: 52.626°N 0.498°W

- Site of Special Scientific Interest
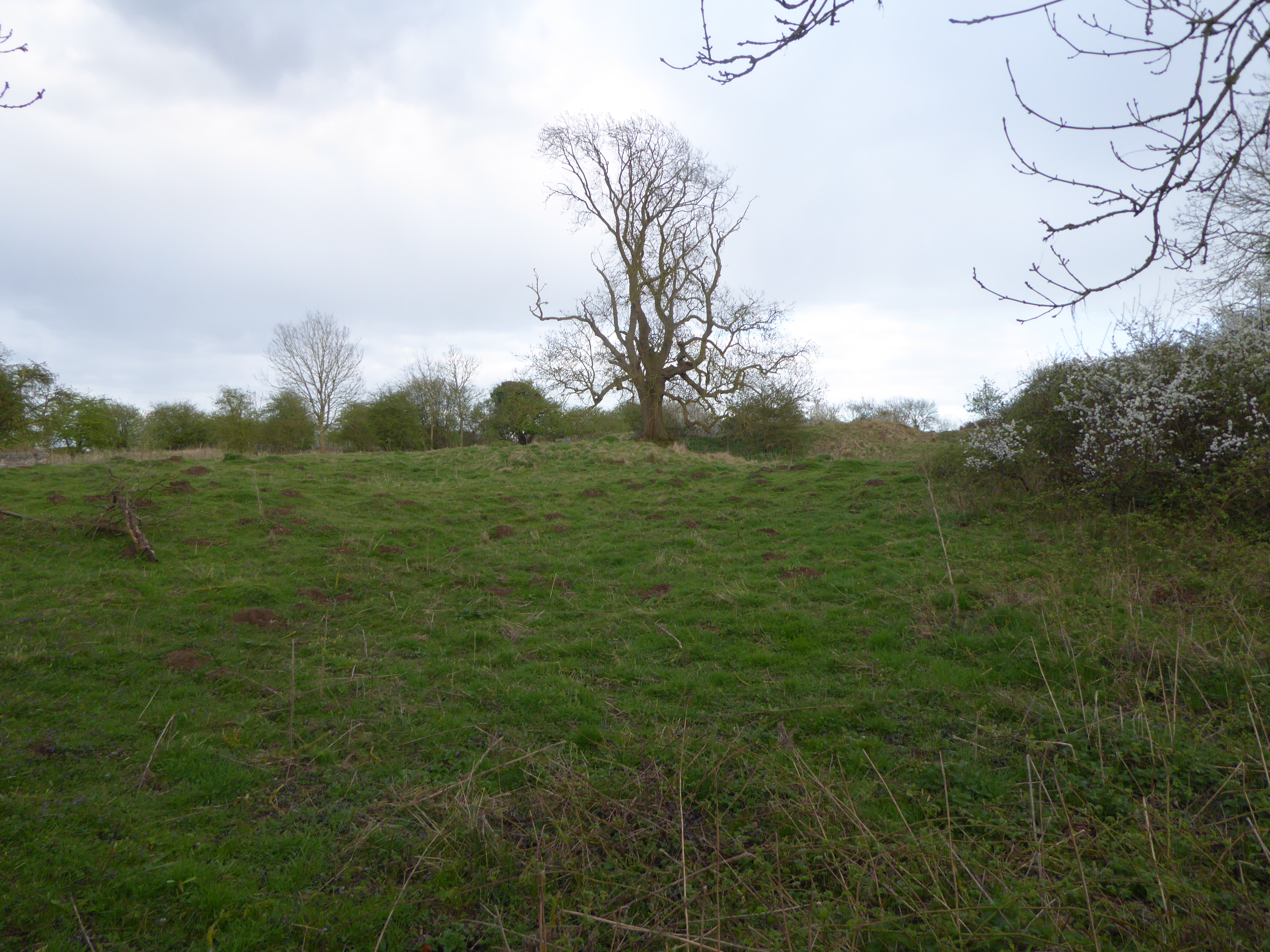
- Location of Racecourse Farm Fields.
- Area of search: Northamptonshire
- Grid reference: TF 017 042
- Interest: Biological
- Area: 5.0 hectares
- Notification date: 1983
- Location map: Magic Map

Racecourse Farm Fields is a 5 hectare biological Site of Special Scientific Interest in Easton on the Hill in Northamptonshire. The site is private land with no public access.

== Flora ==
This former quarry is grassland on Jurassic limestone. The flora is diverse, with over thirty flowering plant species in each square metre. There are several locally rare plants, such as dodder, autumn gentian, clustered bellflower and small scabious. The sward is kept short by grazing by sheep and cattle.
