= Ramsden Corner Plantation =

Nature reserve in Northamptonshire, England

Coordinates: 52.203°N 1.089°W

- Site of Special Scientific Interest
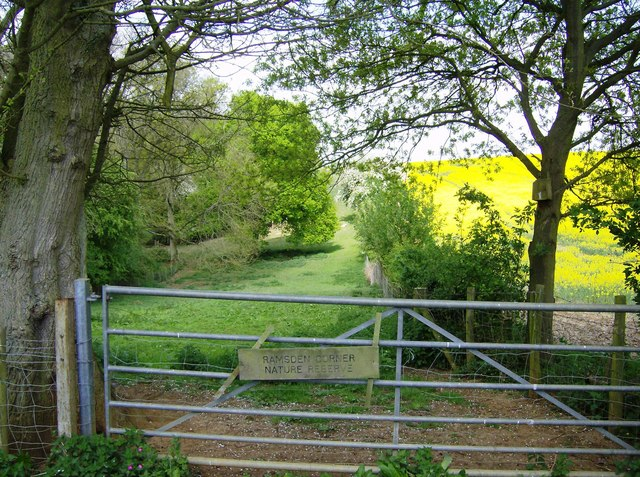
- Location of Ramsden Corner Plantation.
- Area of search: Northamptonshire
- Grid reference: SP 623 564
- Interest: Biological
- Area: 3.2 ha (7.9 acres)
- Notification date: 1986
- Location map: Magic Map

Ramsden Corner Plantation is a 3.2-hectare (7.9-acre) biological Site of Special Scientific Interest west of Northampton. It is managed by the Wildlife Trust for Bedfordshire, Cambridgeshire and Northamptonshire.

A stream runs through this valley site, which is acidic grassland, woodland and scrub on clay and sand. Plants such as wood millet, wood-sorrel and wood vetch are indicators of ancient woodland. Opposite-leaved golden-saxifrage is found in wet flushes.

The Macmillan Way runs along its southern boundary. There is access from Main Street between Farthingstone and Upper Stowe.
