= Bosworth Mill Meadow =

Coordinates: 52.435°N 1.077°W

- Site of Special Scientific Interest
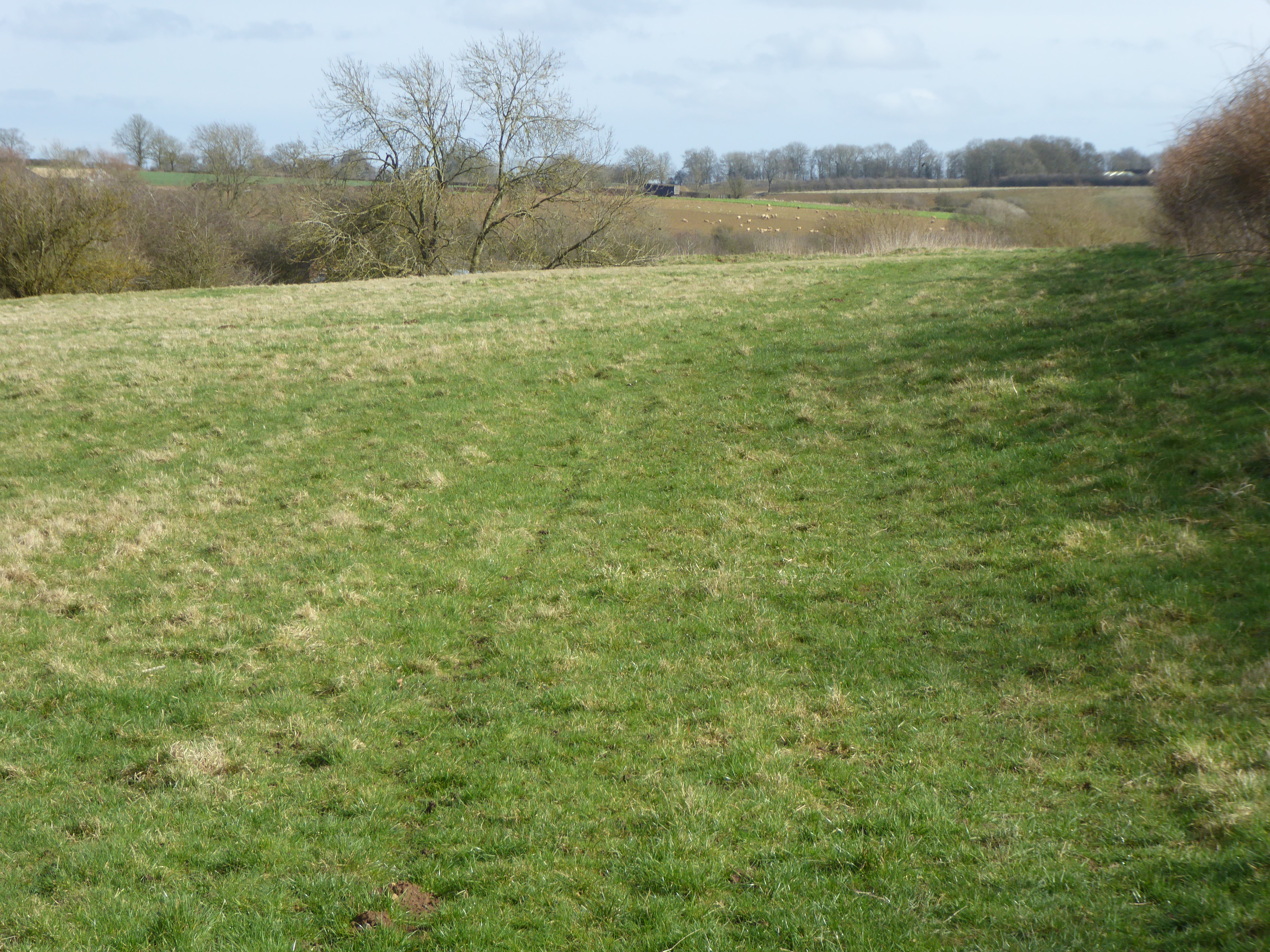
- Location of Bosworth Mill Meadow.
- Area of search: Northamptonshire
- Grid reference: SP 628 822
- Interest: Biological
- Area: 5.7 hectares
- Notification date: 1984
- Location map: Magic Map

Bosworth Mill Meadow is a 5.7-hectare (14-acre) biological Site of Special Scientific Interest north-west of Welford in Northamptonshire.

This hay meadow is traditionally managed. The main flora are crested dog's-tail and common knapweed, with meadow foxtail and great burnet in wet areas. Springs produce seepages which are rich in mosses and sedges. Dry upper slopes are species poor.

There is access from a footpath which runs through the western corner.
