= Weldon Park =

Protected area in Northamptonshire, England

Coordinates: 52.500°N 0.608°W

- Site of Special Scientific Interest
- Location of Weldon Park.
- Area of search: Northamptonshire
- Grid reference: SP 946 900
- Interest: Biological
- Area: 51.7 hectares
- Notification date: 1983
- Location map: Magic Map

Entrance to Weldon Woodland Park

Weldon Park is a 51.7-hectare (128-acre) biological Site of Special Scientific Interest east of Weldon in Northamptonshire.

This ancient woodland is mainly ash, maple and hazel. It has diverse flora, especially on grassland rides, and unusual plants on the wettest soils. Insects include the uncommon purple emperor butterfly.
