= High Wood and Meadow =

Nature reserve in Northamptonshire, England

Coordinates: 52.188°N 1.136°W

- Site of Special Scientific Interest
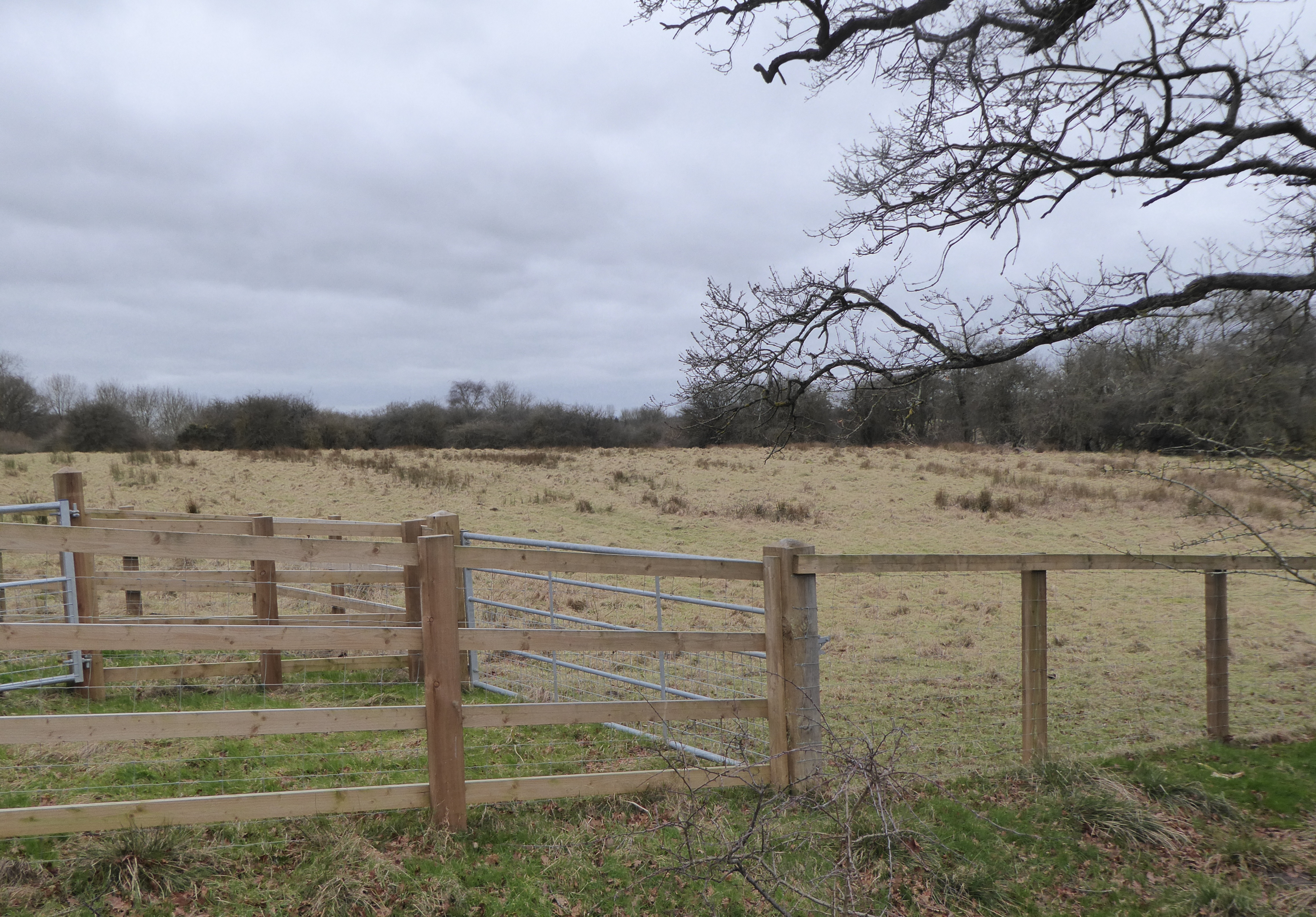
- High Meadow
- Location of High Wood and Meadow.
- Area of search: Northamptonshire
- Grid reference: SP 591 547
- Interest: Biological
- Area: 16.5 hectares
- Notification date: 1984
- Location map: Magic Map

High Wood and Meadow is a 16.5-hectare (41-acre) biological Site of Special Scientific Interest between Farthingstone and Preston Capes in Northamptonshire. It is managed by the Wildlife Trust for Bedfordshire, Cambridgeshire and Northamptonshire.

The wood is ancient and semi-natural on acid soils. It has diverse ground flora, including yellow pimpernel, hairy wood-rush and broad-leaved helleborine. The meadow is acid grassland of a type which is now uncommon, and there are also areas of neutral grassland and marsh on silty peat. There are many ant hills of the yellow meadow ant.

There is (unsignposted) access from the Knightley Way footpath.
