= Wollaston Meadows =

Protected area in Northamptonshire, England

Coordinates: 52.274°N 0.686°W

- Site of Special Scientific Interest
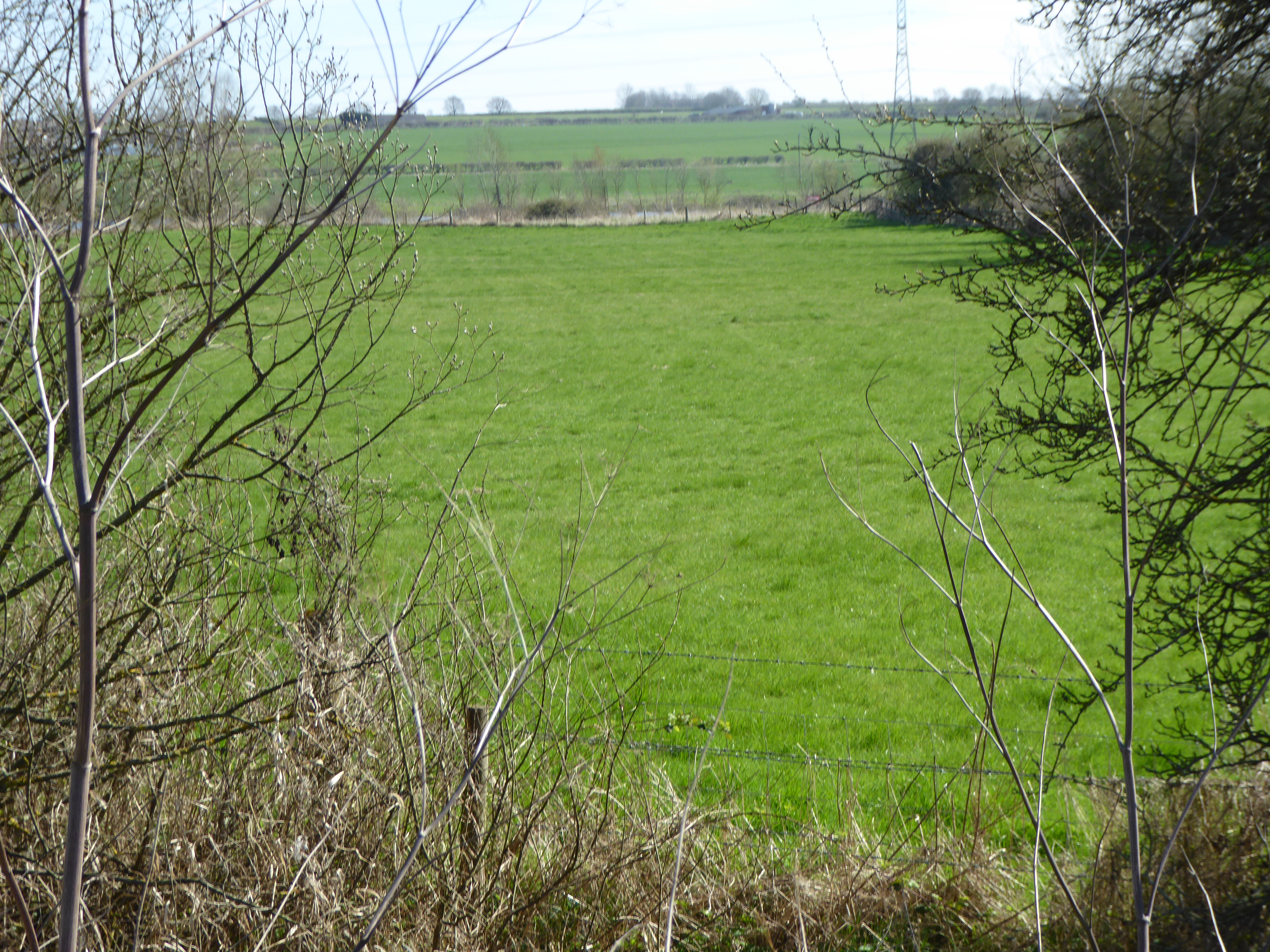
- Location of Wollaston Meadows.
- Area of search: Northamptonshire
- Grid reference: SP 897 648
- Interest: Biological
- Area: 14.3 hectares
- Notification date: 1985
- Location map: Magic Map

Wollaston Meadows is a 14.3-hectare (35-acre) biological Site of Special Scientific Interest south of Wellingborough in Northamptonshire.

This site on the banks of the River Nene is composed of two species-rich hay fields. Flora include meadow foxtail, crested dog's-tail and red fescue. Overgrown hedges and ditches provide habitats for birds, small mammals and invertebrates.

The site is private land with no public access.
