= Badsaddle, Withmale Park and Bush Walk Woods =

Northamptonshire biological site

Coordinates: 52°20′24″N 00°46′39″W

- Site of Special Scientific Interest
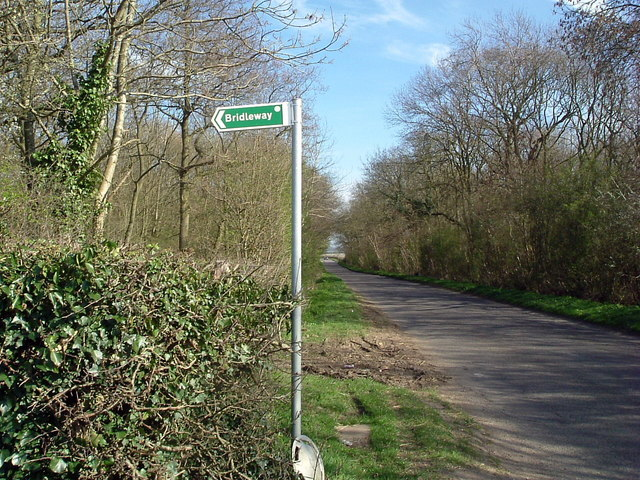
- Location of Badsaddle, Withmale Park and Bush Walk Woods.
- Area of search: Northamptonshire
- Grid reference: SP 832 720
- Interest: Biological
- Area: 25.2 hectares
- Notification date: 1987
- Location map: Magic Map

Badsaddle, Withmale Park and Bush Walk Woods is a 25.2-hectare (62-acre) biological Site of Special Scientific Interest north-west of Wellingborough in Northamptonshire.

This is ancient coppice woodland with oak and ash on wet calcareous soils. Ground flora include herb paris, goldilocks buttercup and four species of orchid.

There is access to Bush Park and Withmale Park Woods from Redhouse Road, which runs between them, and to Badsaddle Wood by a track from the A43 road.
