= Bugbrooke Meadows =

Site of Special Scientific Interest in Northamptonshire, England

Coordinates: 52.223°N 1.018°W

- Site of Special Scientific Interest
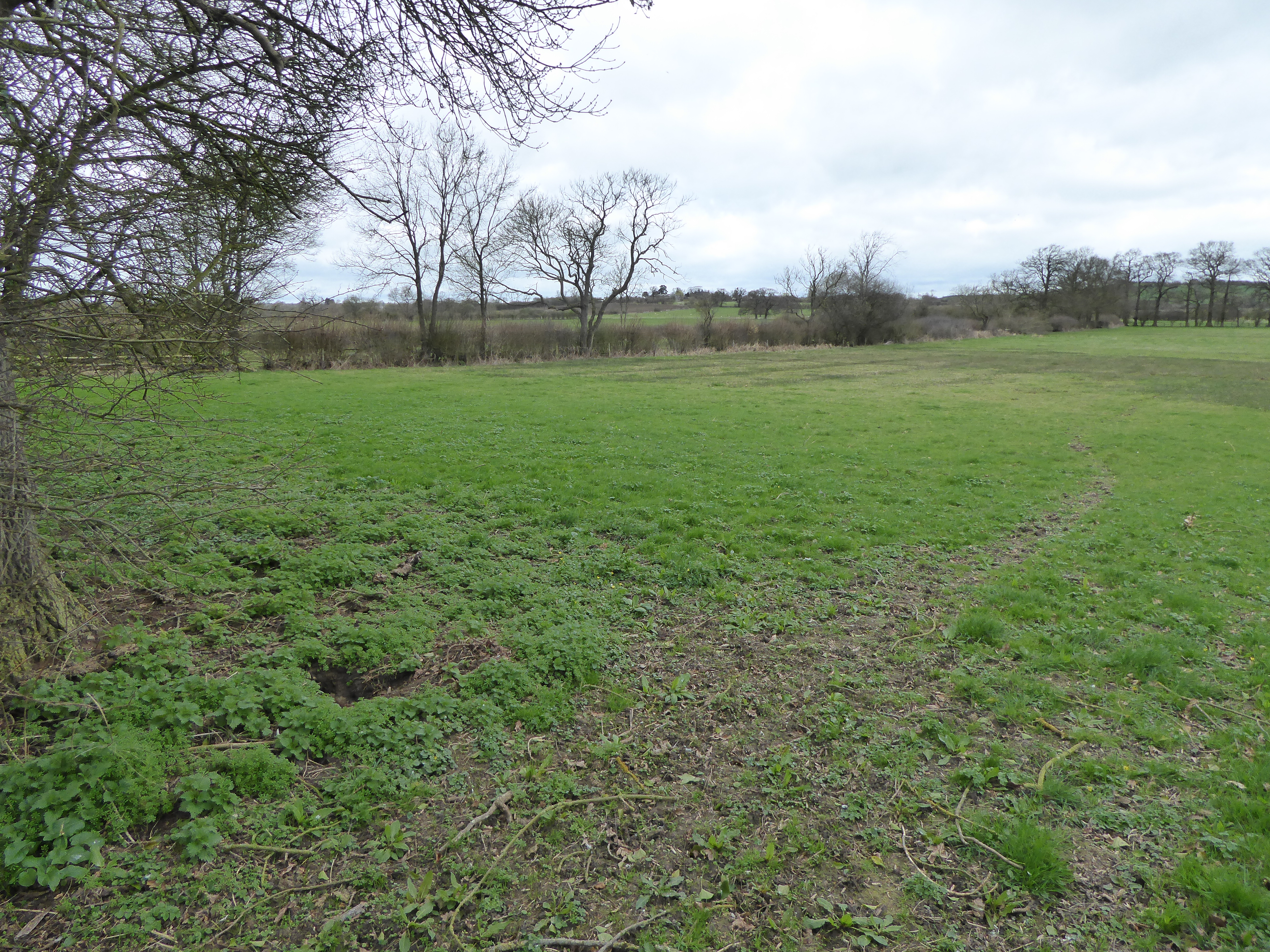
- Location of Bugbrooke Meadows.
- Area of search: Northamptonshire
- Grid reference: SP 671 587
- Interest: Biological
- Area: 10.1 hectares
- Notification date: 1989
- Location map: Magic Map

Bugbrooke Meadows is a 10.1-hectare (25-acre) biological Site of Special Scientific Interest east of Nether Heyford in Northamptonshire. One of the fields with an area of 1.7 hectares is managed by the Wildlife Trust for Bedfordshire, Cambridgeshire and Northamptonshire.

These meadows on the bank of the River Nene which have not been treated with fertilisers, and they often flood in winter. They are probably unique in the county, and they have very diverse damp grassland flora such as jointed rush and greater pond sedge. There are ancient hedges which are important both historically and as a habitat for wildlife.

There is access to the site from the Nene Way between Kislingbury and Nether Heyford, and by a footpath from Bugbrooke.
