= Bozeat Meadow =

Protected area in Northamptonshire, England

Coordinates: 52.222°N 0.682°W

- Site of Special Scientific Interest
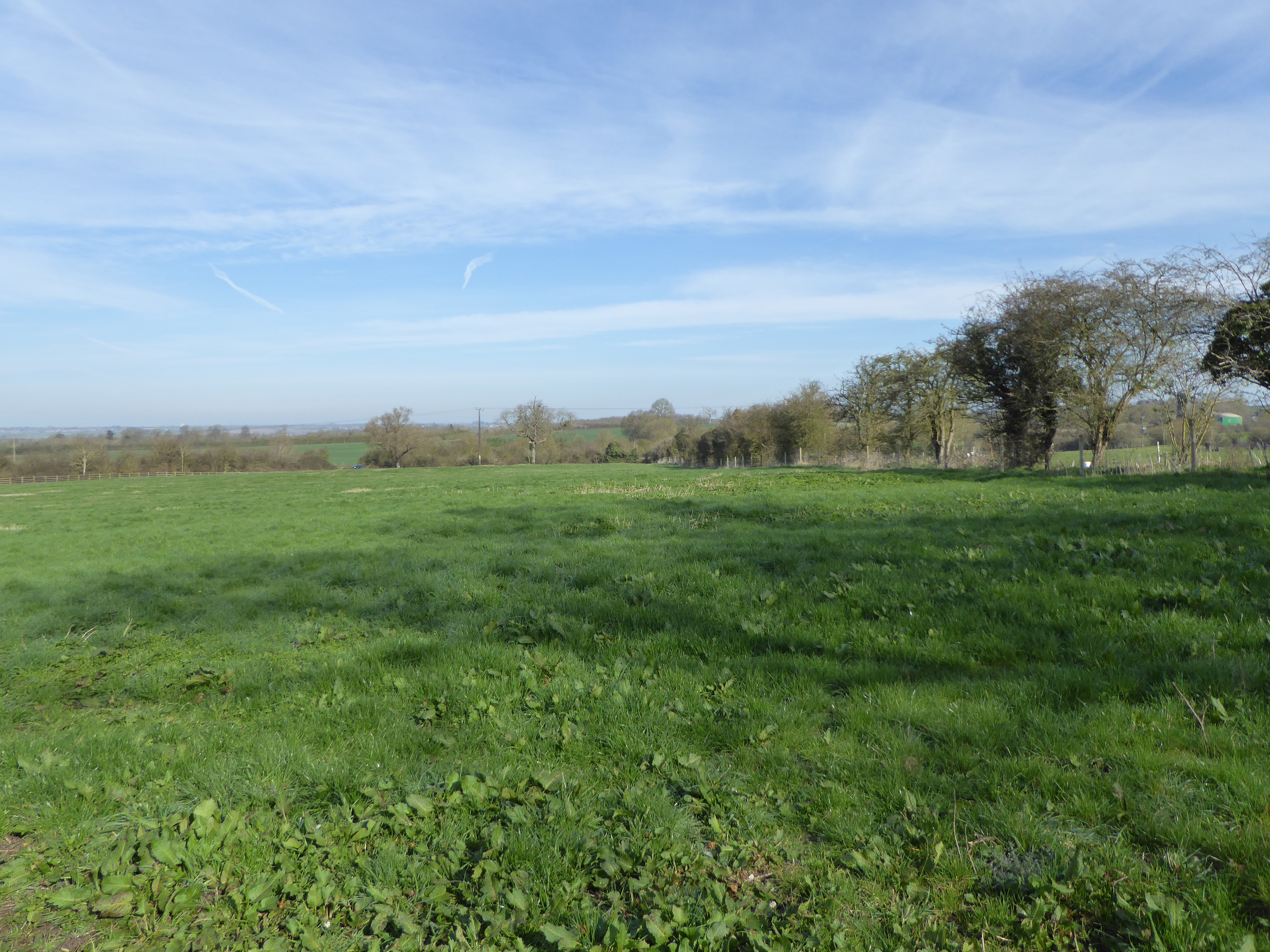
- Location of Bozeat Meadow.
- Area of search: Northamptonshire
- Grid reference: SP 901 590
- Interest: Biological
- Area: 2.6 hectares
- Notification date: 1986
- Location map: Magic Map

Bozeat Meadow is a 2.6-hectare (6.4-acre) biological Site of Special Scientific Interest in Bozeat, east of Northampton.

This is unimproved grassland on well drained clay and loam soils. It has medieval ridge and furrow and diverse flora, including crested dog's-tail, downy oat-grass, quaking grass and dwarf thistle. There are also mature hedgerows and a spring.

The site is private land with no public access.
