= Wadenhoe Marsh and Achurch Meadow =

Coordinates: 52.433°N 0.517°W

- Site of Special Scientific Interest
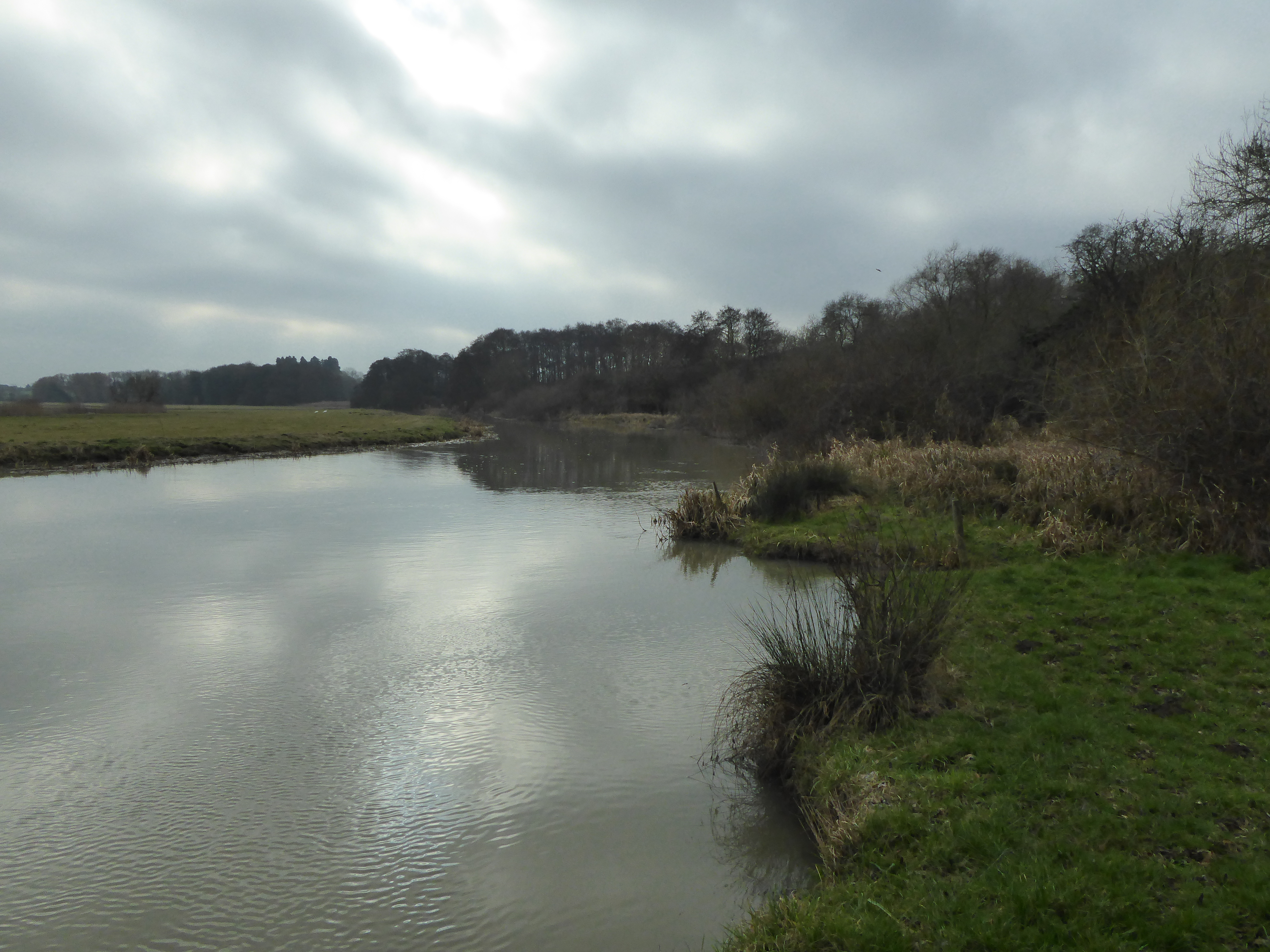
- The River Nene in Wadenhoe Marsh and Achurch Meadow
- Location of Wadenhoe Marsh and Achurch Meadow.
- Area of search: Northamptonshire
- Grid reference: TL 009 826
- Interest: Biological
- Area: 47.5 hectares
- Notification date: 1984
- Location map: Magic Map

Wadenhoe Marsh and Achurch Meadow is a 47.5-hectare (117-acre) biological Site of Special Scientific Interest south of Wadenhoe in Northamptonshire.

This complex site on both sides of the River Nene has a variety of habitats and a diverse range of fauna and flora. The west of the river is alder woodland and marshy grassland. On the east there is the largest example in the county of unimproved grassland on alluvium and gravel, with over 100 flowering plant species. An oxbow in the river is a site for rare plants.

The Nene Way long distance footpath runs through the site west of the river, but the larger eastern meadows are private land with no public access.
