= Dwarf thistle =

Dwarf thistle is a common name for several plants and may refer to:

- Cirsium acaule, native to Europe
- Cirsium drummondii, native to Canada and the northern United States
- Cirsium scariosum, native to western North America

== See also ==
- Carlina acaulis, dwarf carline thistle
