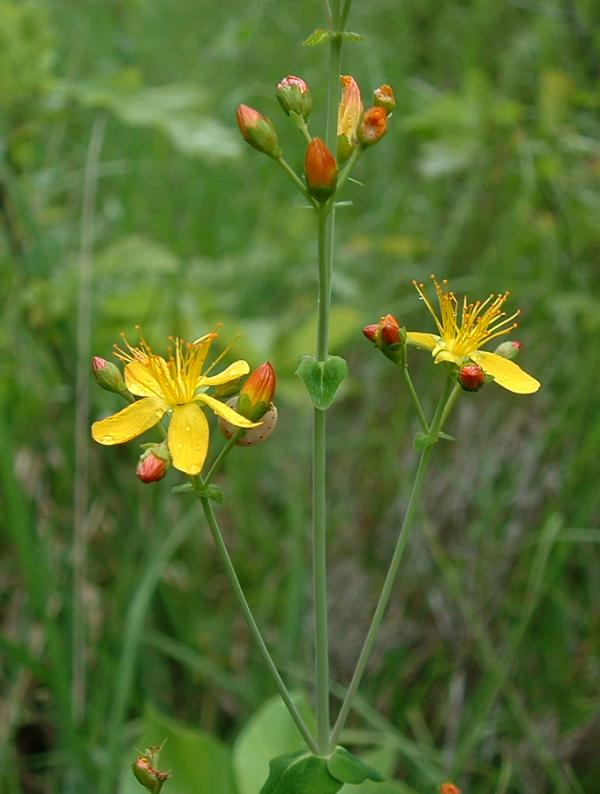

Scientific classification
- Kingdom: Plantae
- Clade: Tracheophytes
- Clade: Angiosperms
- Clade: Eudicots
- Clade: Rosids
- Order: Malpighiales
- Family: Hypericaceae
- Genus: Hypericum
- Section: H. sect. Taeniocarpium
- Species: H. pulchrum

Binomial name
- Hypericum pulchrum L.

= Hypericum pulchrum =

Species of flowering plant in the St John's wort family

Hypericum pulchrum is a flowering plant in the family Hypericaceae, commonly known as slender St John's-wort. It is native to Western Europe.

== Description ==
Hypericum pulchrum is a dainty, rhizomatous perennial plant growing 9–18 in (23–46 cm) high. It has erect smooth stems without ridges or wings. It has a few opposite pairs of untoothed, heart-shaped leaves that half clasp the stem. They are dotted with transparent spots and often have inrolled margins. The terminal inflorescence has rich yellow flowers. Each of these has five small, broad, blunt sepals with black dots on the margins. The five petals are red beneath and have red and black dots on the margins. There are three styles and many stamens with orange anthers in three bundles. The fruit is a dehiscent capsule.

== Habitat ==
Hypericum pulchrum is a calcifuge, found in heathy places, dry moorlands, among rocks in upland regions and on road verges on non-calcareous soils.

== Distribution ==
Hypericum pulchrum is found growing in Austria, Belgium, Britain, Czech Republic, Slovakia, Denmark, Finland, France, Germany, Ireland, Italy, Netherlands, Norway, Poland, Portugal, Spain, Sweden and Switzerland. It is found in suitable habitats throughout the United Kingdom. It has been introduced to New Zealand where it has spread across the South Island and the southern part of the North Island.
