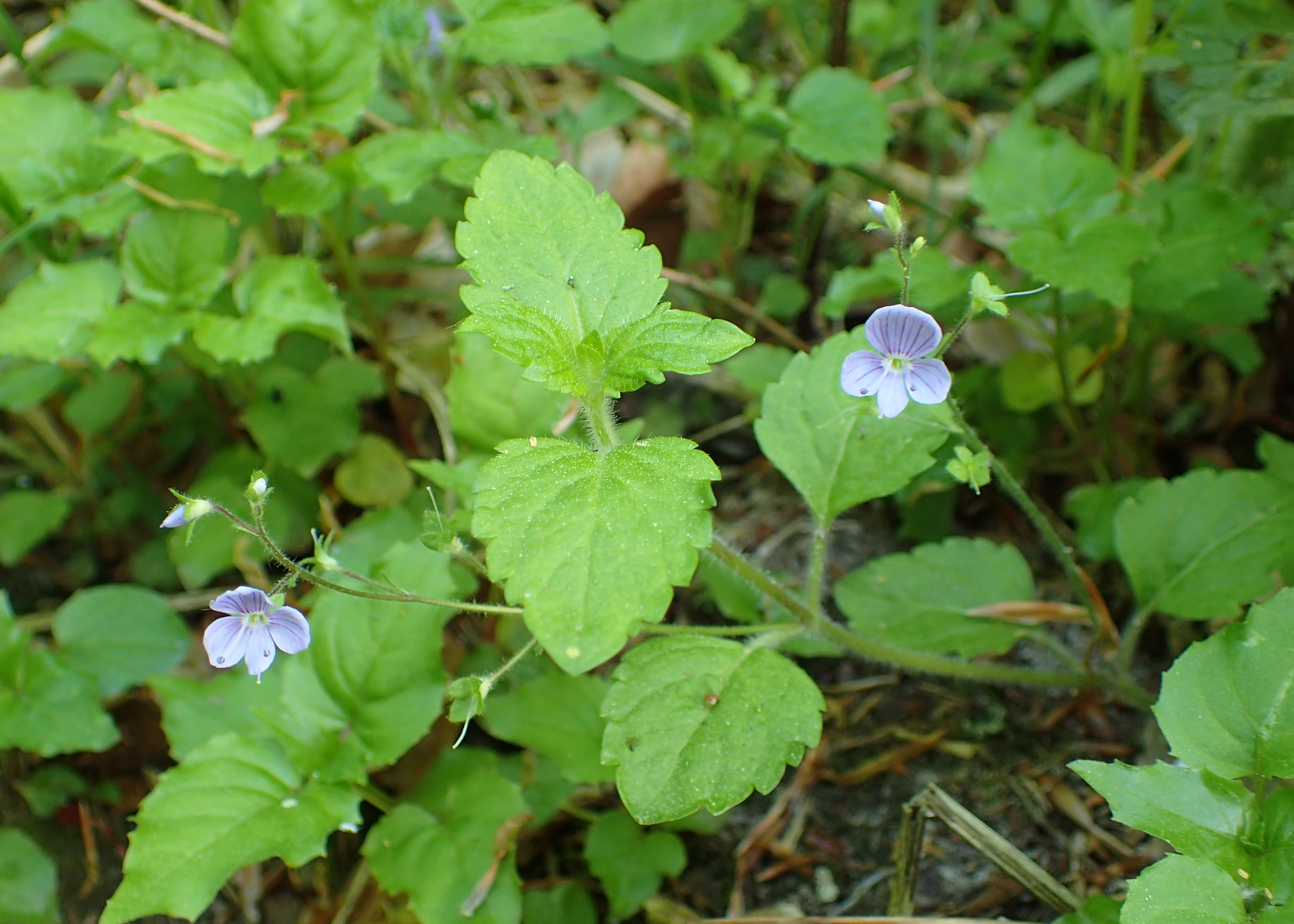

Scientific classification
- Kingdom: Plantae
- Clade: Embryophytes
- Clade: Tracheophytes
- Clade: Spermatophytes
- Clade: Angiosperms
- Clade: Eudicots
- Clade: Asterids
- Order: Lamiales
- Family: Plantaginaceae
- Genus: Veronica
- Species: V. montana

Binomial name
- Veronica montana L.

= Veronica montana =

Species of flowering plant

Veronica montana or wood speedwell is a perennial species of flowering plant in the family Plantaginaceae.

== Description ==
Veronica montana is a perennial plant growing up to 20 cm in height. It has a sprawling growth habitat, which helps it spread across the forest floor. The plants stems are covered in tiny, soft glandular hairs. Stems can produce roots when contact with damp soil is made. The leaves are ovate, toothed and are also covered in hairs. They appear in symmetrical pairs along the plants stem. The plant hosts multiple lilac coloured flowers from late spring to early summer. Flowers are rather small at around 7mm across.

Similar species include Veronica chamaedrys (whose leaves are duller, hairier, narrower and commonly almost unstalked, with hairs usually focussed in two lines on the stems) and Veronica persica (whose flowers are solitary and emerge from the stem with the leaf stalks)

== Distribution ==
The species native range is from Europe to Western Transcaucasus, Northwestern Africa.

The following ranges are indicated: Albania, Algeria, Austria, Baltic states, Belarus, Belgium, Bulgaria, Corsica, the Czech Republic, Denmark, France, Germany, Great Britain, Greece, Hungary, Ireland, Italy, the Netherlands, North Caucasus, Poland, Portugal, Romania, Sicily, Slovakia, Spain, Sweden, Switzerland, South Caucasus, Tunisia, Turkey, Ukraine, Yugoslavia.

== Habitat ==
Wood speedwell is commonly associated with long-established, damp deciduous woodland, where it is generally found in lowland habitats. V. montana is also known to inhabit areas with neutral to mildly acidic soils.

Another habitat it can be found is within shaded hedgerows where it can also find its way into gardens.

This species can grow within a wide range of substrates from loam, heavy clay and sandy soils.
