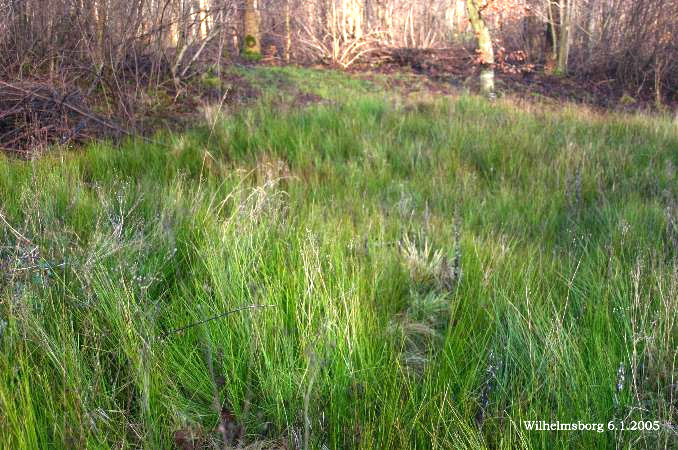
- Stand in January, Vilhelmsborg (Eastern Jutland, Denmark)

Scientific classification
- Kingdom: Plantae
- Clade: Tracheophytes
- Clade: Angiosperms
- Clade: Monocots
- Clade: Commelinids
- Order: Poales
- Family: Juncaceae
- Genus: Juncus
- Species: J. subnodulosus

Binomial name
- Juncus subnodulosus Schrank

Synonyms
- Juncus obtusiflorus Ehrh. ex Hoffm.

= Juncus subnodulosus =

Species of grass

Juncus subnodulosus, the blunt-flowered rush, is a species of rush. It natively occurs from the Mediterranean region across temperate Europe, but it does not range far into Scandinavia. Introduced populations exist in New Zealand and North America.

This species is an important associate within the anthropogenic Juncus subnodulosus-Cirsium palustre fen-meadow ecosystem, an important habitat type of Western Europe. J. subnodulosus is particularly prevalent within the disturbed ridges of this type of fen-meadow.
