= Listed buildings in Bedfordshire =

As of January 2026, there are 3,333 listed buildings in Bedfordshire. The term "listed building", in the United Kingdom, refers to a building or structure designated as being of special architectural, historical, or cultural significance. Details of all the listed buildings are contained in the National Heritage List for England. They are categorised in three grades: Grade I consists of buildings of outstanding architectural or historical interest, Grade II* includes significant buildings of more than local interest and Grade II consists of buildings of special architectural or historical interest. Buildings in England are listed by the Secretary of State for Culture, Media and Sport on recommendations provided by English Heritage, which also determines the grading.

Some listed buildings are looked after by the National Trust or English Heritage while others are in private ownership or administered by trusts.

== Listed buildings by grade ==
- Grade I listed buildings in Bedfordshire
- Grade II* listed buildings in Bedfordshire

== Listed buildings by district or unitary authority ==
Within each local government district, buildings are listed by civil parish or unparished area.

=== Bedford ===
- Listed buildings in Bedford
- Listed buildings in Biddenham
- Listed buildings in Bletsoe
- Listed buildings in Bolnhurst and Keysoe
- Listed buildings in Bromham, Bedfordshire
- Listed buildings in Cardington, Bedfordshire
- Listed buildings in Carlton with Chellington
- Listed buildings in Clapham, Bedfordshire
- Listed buildings in Colmworth
- Listed buildings in Cople
- Listed buildings in Cotton End
- Listed buildings in Dean and Shelton
- Listed buildings in Elstow
- Listed buildings in Felmersham
- Listed buildings in Great Barford
- Listed buildings in Great Denham
- Listed buildings in Harrold, Bedfordshire
- Listed buildings in Kempston
- Listed buildings in Kempston Rural
- Listed buildings in Knotting and Souldrop
- Listed buildings in Little Barford
- Listed buildings in Little Staughton
- Listed buildings in Melchbourne and Yielden
- Listed buildings in Milton Ernest
- Listed buildings in Oakley, Bedfordshire
- Listed buildings in Odell, Bedfordshire
- Listed buildings in Pavenham
- Listed buildings in Pertenhall
- Listed buildings in Podington
- Listed buildings in Ravensden
- Listed buildings in Renhold
- Listed buildings in Riseley, Bedfordshire
- Listed buildings in Roxton, Bedfordshire
- Listed buildings in Sharnbrook
- Listed buildings in Shortstown
- Listed buildings in Stagsden
- Listed buildings in Staploe
- Listed buildings in Stevington
- Listed buildings in Stewartby
- Listed buildings in Swineshead, Bedfordshire
- Listed buildings in Thurleigh
- Listed buildings in Turvey, Bedfordshire
- Listed buildings in Wilden, Bedfordshire
- Listed buildings in Willington, Bedfordshire
- Listed buildings in Wilshamstead
- Listed buildings in Wixams
- Listed buildings in Wootton, Bedfordshire
- Listed buildings in Wyboston, Chawston and Colesden
- Listed buildings in Wymington

=== Central Bedfordshire ===
- Listed buildings in Ampthill
- Listed buildings in Arlesey
- Listed buildings in Aspley Guise
- Listed buildings in Aspley Heath
- Listed buildings in Astwick
- Listed buildings in Barton-le-Clay
- Listed buildings in Battlesden
- Listed buildings in Biggleswade
- Listed buildings in Billington, Bedfordshire
- Listed buildings in Blunham
- Listed buildings in Brogborough
- Listed buildings in Caddington
- Listed buildings in Campton and Chicksands
- Listed buildings in Chalgrave
- Listed buildings in Chalton, Bedfordshire
- Listed buildings in Clifton, Bedfordshire
- Listed buildings in Clophill
- Listed buildings in Cranfield
- Listed buildings in Dunstable
- Listed buildings in Dunton, Bedfordshire
- Listed buildings in Eaton Bray
- Listed buildings in Edworth
- Listed buildings in Eggington
- Listed buildings in Eversholt
- Listed buildings in Everton, Bedfordshire
- Listed buildings in Eyeworth
- Listed buildings in Fairfield, Bedfordshire
- Listed buildings in Flitton and Greenfield
- Listed buildings in Flitwick
- Listed buildings in Gravenhurst, Bedfordshire
- Listed buildings in Harlington, Bedfordshire
- Listed buildings in Haynes, Bedfordshire
- Listed buildings in Heath and Reach
- Listed buildings in Henlow
- Listed buildings in Hockliffe
- Listed buildings in Houghton Conquest
- Listed buildings in Houghton Regis
- Listed buildings in Hulcote and Salford
- Listed buildings in Husborne Crawley
- Listed buildings in Hyde, Bedfordshire
- Listed buildings in Kensworth
- Listed buildings in Langford, Bedfordshire
- Listed buildings in Leighton–Linslade
- Listed buildings in Lidlington
- Listed buildings in Marston Moreteyne
- Listed buildings in Maulden
- Listed buildings in Meppershall
- Listed buildings in Millbrook, Bedfordshire
- Listed buildings in Milton Bryan
- Listed buildings in Moggerhanger
- Listed buildings in Northill
- Listed buildings in Old Warden
- Listed buildings in Potsgrove
- Listed buildings in Potton
- Listed buildings in Pulloxhill
- Listed buildings in Ridgmont
- Listed buildings in Sandy, Bedfordshire
- Listed buildings in Shefford, Bedfordshire
- Listed buildings in Shillington, Bedfordshire
- Listed buildings in Silsoe
- Listed buildings in Slip End
- Listed buildings in Southill, Bedfordshire
- Listed buildings in Stanbridge, Bedfordshire
- Listed buildings in Steppingley
- Listed buildings in Stondon
- Listed buildings in Stotfold
- Listed buildings in Streatley, Bedfordshire
- Listed buildings in Studham
- Listed buildings in Sundon
- Listed buildings in Sutton, Bedfordshire
- Listed buildings in Tempsford
- Listed buildings in Tilsworth
- Listed buildings in Tingrith
- Listed buildings in Toddington, Bedfordshire
- Listed buildings in Totternhoe
- Listed buildings in Westoning
- Listed buildings in Whipsnade
- Listed buildings in Woburn, Bedfordshire
- Listed buildings in Wrestlingworth and Cockayne Hatley

==== Luton ====
- Listed buildings in Luton
