= Listed buildings in Pertenhall =

Historic structures in Bedfrodshire, England

Pertenhall is a civil parish in Bedford, Bedfordshire, England. It contains 19 listed buildings that are recorded in the National Heritage List for England. Of these, one is listed at Grade I, the highest of the three grades, one is listed at Grade II*, the middle grade, and the others are at Grade II, the lowest grade.

== Key ==
Grade	Criteria
I	Buildings of exceptional interest, sometimes considered to be internationally important
II*	Particularly important buildings of more than special interest
II	Buildings of national importance and special interest

== Buildings ==
Name and location	Photograph	Date	Notes	Grade
Hoo Farmhouse; 52.27455°N 0.39576°W	—	16th century	The cottage consists of colour washed rough cast over a timber frame, with a clay tile roof topping the two storeys. To the northeast elevation, there is a substantial external gable end stack of coursed limestone rubble with three diagonal flues, and a similar with two flues to the northwest elevation. A single storey, colour washed brick extension is present at the northeast gable end. Inside, there is an arched stone chimney piece on the ground floor.	II
Yew Tree Cottage; 52.27049°N 0.41468°W	—	18th century	The 18th century cottae is of a timber frame with a colour washed roughcast exterior. The building is arranged in a single storey L-plan, and has a thatched roof over. On the southeast elevation, there is a 20th-century open-sided, thatched roof porch, and there are further single storey lean-tos with tile roofs to the north and south gable ends of the main wing.	II
Green End Farmhouse; 52.27161°N 0.41706°W	—	17th century	A two-storey T-plan, timber-framed cottage with colour washed roughcast and an old clay tile roof. A single storey extension to the north end of the front wing is present.	II
The Cottage; 52.27221°N 0.41700°W	—	17th century	A one-storey cottage of 17th century origin, consisting of a timber frame with colour washed plaster infill, and a pantile roof. There is a further one storey 20th century extension built in a similar style.	II
Manor Cottage; 52.27460°N 0.41420°W	—	c1700	The cottage is constructed from pebbledash over a timber frame, and has a thatched roof over the single storey. A two-storey 19th century extension is present to the east gable end of red brick and slate roof; alongside a weatherboarded lean-to extension to the west gable end.	II
The Manor; 52.27586°N 0.41286°W	—	Late 16th century	The manor is of late 16th century origins, however was later altered in the 19th century. It is constructed from colour washed roughcast over a timber frame, with some if it rebuilt in brick in the 19th century. The building consists of an E-plan of two storeys, and a central two storey gable porched at the front, with an old clay tile roof covering the whole building. Inside, the dining room retains its oak panelling, and a carved chimney piece with high relief figures of circa 1570.	II
Church of St Peter; 52.27622°N 0.41227°W		15th century	The parish church is mainly 15th century in origin, with both earlier and later elements present. Its construction is of coursed limestone rubble with ashlar dressings. The west tower dates to the 15th century, and is of four stages, with diagonal buttresses and a broach spire with two tiers of lucarnes. Inside, the octagonal font is from the 13th century, and some 16th and 17th century pewing remains extant.	I
The Old Rectory; 52.27620°N 0.41155°W	—	Late 18th century	Late 18th century former rectory for the parish church, now a private dwelling. It is constructed from red brick with a hipped tile roof behind a parapet, and consist of three storeys. To the rear is a two-storey extension of chequered brick and slate, dating to the 19th century; alongside further 20th century additions designed by Sir Albert Richardson. Inside the property is a well staircase with a circular domed skylight over, panelled woodwork, and white marble chimney pieces.	II*
The Lodge Cottage to the Old Rectory; 52.27584°N 0.40951°W	—	Early 19th century	Built in the cottage orné style, it formerly served as the lodge for the rectory. It consists of a compact L-plan of one storey, constructed from colour washed roughcast over a timber frame, with a thatched roof.	II
Dovecote North West of The Lodge Cottage, The Old Rectory; 52.27612°N 0.40978°W	—	Early 19th century	A small two storey dovecote of red brick with a clay tile roof. There is a small gabled woodern lantern with bargeboards and finials to enable access for birds, and the south elevation has a central wooden plank door.	II
Garden House to Wood End House; 52.28195°N 0.40356°W	—	Mid-19th century	The garden is hexagonal in shape, and consists of a single storey that is rendered and colour washed, with a leaded roof. The east elevation has a slightly projecting chimney stack.	II
Lodge to Wood End House; 52.28184°N 0.40324°W	—	Mid-19th century	The house is of mid-19th century origin, however it probably incorporates a building previously on the site. It is a laid out as a single storey L-plan of brick and some roughcast, with the elevations that are visible from the public road being colour washed. The building has a clay tile roof, and there are one storey extensions to the west and south elevations.	II
1, Wood End; 52.28040°N 0.40557°W		18th century	Of a timber-frame construction, the cottage has a colour washed plaster infill, less the northwest bays which have colour washed brick on the ground floor, and colour washed roughcast at the attic level. It has a thatched roof, and a small 20th century extension to the southwest elevation with the entrance located in this. Furthermore, a further one storey colour washed brick extension is at the rear.	II
Chadwell Farmhouse; 52.27662°N 0.41526°W	—	17th century	The farmhouse is of rough cast over a timber frame, with a clay tile roof. The building was initially 2 bays long, before it was extended to the north and an additional parallel block was added to the rear. The whole house is of two storeys, less a further 20th century extension to the north gable end.	II
Ridge Cottage; 52.27066°N 0.41506°W	—	17th century	17th century cottage consisting of two storeys of colour washed roughcast over a timber frame, with an old clay tile roof. Originally an L-plan layout there is an additional 19th century block to the east. A one-storey lean-to is present at the rear of the east wing.	II
Wood End House; 52.28228°N 0.40365°W	—	Early to mid-19th century	A small country house consisting of a main two storey, cross-plan block, with single storey hipped roof blocks within the corners of the front elevation, and two storey flat-roofed blocks in the corners of the rear elevation. An additional two-storey block project from the northwest corner. The whole building is rendered and colour washed, with a gabled slate roof.	II
Wood End Farmhouse; 52.28067°N 0.40671°W	—	c1830	The farmhouse is constructed from chequered brick with a slate roof. Two red brick multiple stacks are situated at the rear.	II
Hall Farmhouse; 52.27460°N 0.41608°W	—	17th century	A timber framed farmhouse with a colour washed roughcast exterior, and a pantiled roof. The building is arranged as a single storey L-plan. There is a further single storey lean-to the north elevation of the south wing.	II
Barn North of The Lodge Cottage, The Old Rectory; 52.27610°N 0.40956°W	—	Late 18th century	The late 18th century barn is of a timber frame upon a red brick plinth, with red brick infill to the south and weatherboarding to the north. Corrugated iron covers the queen post roof structure.	II
