= Listed buildings in Kempston =

Kempston is a civil parish in Bedford, Bedfordshire, England. It contains 21 listed buildings that are recorded in the National Heritage List for England. Of these, none are listed at Grade I, the highest of the three grades, one is listed at Grade II*, the middle grade and, the others are at Grade II, the lowest grade.

== Key ==
| Grade | Criteria |
|---|---|
| I | Buildings of exceptional interest, sometimes considered to be internationally important |
| II* | Particularly important buildings of more than special interest |
| II | Buildings of national importance and special interest |

== Buildings ==
| Name and location | Photograph | Date | Notes | Grade |
|---|---|---|---|---|
| Bedfordshire and Hertfordshire Regimental War Memorial; 52.12478°N 0.48327°W | | 1920 | Regimental memorial for the Bedfordshire and Hertfordshire Regiment erected after World War One to commemorate the fallen from that war. In 1950, a further obelisk was added in honour of those in the Second World War. It consists of a circular memorial temple in front of a concave screen wall, flanked by a pair of stone ashlar obelisks. | II* |
| St John's Homes; 52.11681°N 0.49885°W | — | 1881 | Row of 19th century almshouses founded for members of the Church of England. Of a red brick structure, with the ground floor clad in colour washed plaster, and the first floor hung with decorative tiles and mock timber framing on the projecting gables. The main five bay block has two storeys, with single storeyed blocks projecting from the west and east. The whole building has a clay tile roof. | II |
| Walnut Tree Cottage; 52.11561°N 0.51430°W | — | Mid to late 19th century | Formerly the estate cottage for Kempton Bury, the house is now a private dwelling. It is laid out in a one storey T-plan, and is constructed from chequered brick with blue brick dressings, along with a clay tile roof with bands of fishscale tiles. | II |
| 31, Church Walk; 52.11589°N 0.50883°W | — | c1700 | Two storey house, formerly divided into two. Of a timber frame construction, the front elevation was rebuilt with brick in the 19th century. The whole exterior is cloaked in colour washed roughcast. | II |
| 95 and 97, High Street; 52.11520°N 0.50358°W | — | 18th century | A house, with the downstairs having been converted into a shop. The right hand, main, block is of colour washed course rubble with a clay tile roof. The left hand, smaller, block is timber framed with colour washed brick infill, and has a pantile roof. This block has a carriage entrance and 20th century shop window. | II |
| Number 110 and Adjoining Outbuildings Parallel to Water Lane; 52.11470°N 0.50730°W | — | c1600 | The house is of timber framed construction with a rendered exterior imitating ashlar, with a clay tile roof. There are a number of single storey outbuildings bordering Water Lane, that are all of timer frame and clay tile roof. Half have a limestone rubble plinth and roughcast render, and the other half with frontage rebuilt or encased in brick. | II |
| Numbers 116 and Parts of 118 and 120; 52.11454°N 0.50756°W | — | 17th century | Formerly a singular house, now divided into 3 dwellings. Largely of 17th century origin, there is an 18th century block linking number 120 to 114. The building is timber framed with colour washed roughcast render, and has an old clay tile roof. It is arranged in an L-plan with two storeys, and there is a small 19th century colour washed brick and slate extension projecting east. | II |
| Sailors Bridge Cottages; 52.10654°N 0.50174°W | — | 1865 | Formerly part of the Hoo Estate, the pair of cottages were built in the cottage orné style. They are laid out in a one storey L-plan, and are of chequered red brick with yellow brick dressings, along with fishscale tile roofs. | II |
| The Manor; 52.11835°N 0.50225°W | | c1815 | 19th century manor house of blocks and partly of coursed limestone rubble, with cement render, and colourwash to the front elevation. There is a slate roof over the two storey block. | II |
| King William IV Public House; 52.11530°N 0.50416°W | — | c1600 | 17th century public house, arranged in a two storey L-plan arrangement. Constructed of a timber frame with colour washed brick infill with a clay tile roof. There is a one storey two-bay additional block projecting from the left gable end, of timber frame with a colour washed roughcast front. Furthermore, there are various 20th century additions to the rear of the property. | II |
| 114, High Street; 52.11471°N 0.50773°W | — | 18th century | The left hand portion of the house is timber framed whilst the right hand portion is a later addition of brick, with the whole of the building having a colour washed roughcast render exterior. A clay tile roof tops the two storey building, and the south gable end adjoins number 120. | II |
| Parts of Numbers 118 and 120; 52.11450°N 0.50765°W | — | Early to mid-19th century | Previously a single house, the building is now divided into two, two storey, dwellings. Number 118 is of yellow brick, whilst number 120 is of slightly darker more mottled brick. The houses have a slate roof that is hipped to number 118. | II |
| The Old Mill House; 52.11686°N 0.50655°W | — | c1800 | Two storey mill house originating from circa 1800, potentially encompassing an earlier building on the site. Constructed from red brick and a clay tile roof. | II |
| Kempston Grange; 52.12377°N 0.49077°W | | c1845 | Yellow brick manor house with hipped slate roofs. The house is arranged in a complex plan, roughly an L-shape of two storeys. The main entrance is situated on the east elevation, and is surrounded by a large projecting porch of colourwashed stucco. Inside, the ground floor southeast room retains its carved marble fireplace with overmantel mirror, and plasterwork decoration. | II |
| Walnut Cottage; 52.11567°N 0.50242°W | — | 17th century | The 17th century timber framed house has a three room, one storey plan. The exterior is of colour washed roughcast exterior, with a clay tile roof. There is a 20th century single storey addition projecting from the east end of the front elevation. | II |
| Russet Cottage; 52.11517°N 0.50719°W | — | 18th century | Formerly a pair of houses, it is now a single cottage. Of a timber frame construction with a colour washed rough cast exterior, and clay tile roof. The main structure is two storeys, there is a large 20th century additional wing projecting from the west elevation, along with a lean-to on the south gable end. | II |
| Church of the Transfiguration; 52.12017°N 0.49028°W | | 1940 | Red brick parish church with ashlar dressings, which is orientated roughly north-south. It has hipped clay tile roofs, and overall is built in a mixture of styles: them being the simplified Gothic, and Arts and Crafts movement. Inside, it has a barrel vaulted roof to the nave and chancel, and a half barrel vault to the north aisle. | II |
| Garden Walls, Piers, Gates and Railings at Kempston Bury; 52.11482°N 0.51746°W | — | 18th century | Consists of the walls, piers, gates, and railings that enclose a rectangular garden southeast of the main house. The piers and walls are of red brick with stone dressings. The gates and railings are made from wrought iron. A pair of the brick piers are surmounted by stone spread eagles. | II |
| Lodge to Kempston Bury; 52.11614°N 0.51650°W | — | Mid to late 19th century | Originally served as the lodge to Kempston Bury, now divided into two cottages. Built in the cottage orné style, with red brick and yellow brick dressings. The roof is of alternating rows of plain and decorative tiles. The lodge is laid out as a one storey T-plan. | II |
| The Barns; 52.11443°N 0.50594°W | — | 17th century | 17th century house reworked in the 19th century. The original block is of timber framing, whilst the 19th century additions are constructed from brick; the whole structure has an exterior of roughcast and colour wash, under a clay tile roof. Overall, with the 19th century additions the property forms a 2 storey L-plan layout. There is a 20th century addition to the south block, alongside a one storey lean-to at the rear. | II |
| The Keep; 52.12437°N 0.48342°W | | 1876 | Originally built as an armoury, stores, and quarters for the adjoining barracks in the fortress gothic revival style, now converted for use as offices. Constructed from brick with stone dressings, and a hipped slate roof. The main keep consists of three storeys and a basement, with the blocks either side being two storeys and a basement. One of eight remaining Cardwell keeps in the country. | II |
