= Listed buildings in Dean and Shelton =

Dean and Shelton is a civil parish in Bedford, Bedfordshire, England. It contains 23 listed buildings that are recorded in the National Heritage List for England. Of these, two are listed at Grade I, the highest of the three grades and the others are at Grade II, the lowest grade.

== Key ==
| Grade | Criteria |
|---|---|
| I | Buildings of exceptional interest, sometimes considered to be internationally important |
| II* | Particularly important buildings of more than special interest |
| II | Buildings of national importance and special interest |

== Buildings ==
| Name and location | Photograph | Date | Notes | Grade |
|---|---|---|---|---|
| Pear Tree Cottage; 52.29711°N 0.46870°W | — | Late 17th to early 18th century | The two storey cottage is constructed from colour washed rough cast and brick on a timber frame, under an old clay tile roof. There is both a red brick ridge chimney stack, and integral south gable end stack. | II |
| Farmbuilding to North West of Dean House Farm; 52.29847°N 0.46830°W | | Mid to late 19th century | Former mill now in use as a farm building. The three storey block is constructed from red bricks and is topped with a slate roof. There is a further single storey building on the north side. | II |
| Church of St Mary the Virgin; 52.11993°N 0.41691°W | | 14th century | The parish church is mainly of 14th century origin, and is formed from coursed limestone rubble with ashlar dressings, underneath lead roofs. The tower is on the west end of the structure, and is of two stages, topped with a plain parapet with crocketed pinnacles set diagonally at angles. The pulpit, some of the pews, and part of the screen are from the 15th century, and also inside is a 14th-century circular font on eight shafts. | I |
| Shelton Hall; 52.30680°N 0.48524°W | — | 17th century | The property is situated on with a rectangular moated site, and consists of coursed rubble, incorporating some red brick, and rendered. The front of the roof is formed of slate, whilst the rear is clay tiles. There is a 20th-century, two storey extension to the north east elevation. | II |
| The Old Rectory; 52.30792°N 0.48741°W | — | 18th century | Former rectory for the parish church, that was constructed in the 18th century with later additions. Consists of colour washed brick and coursed rubble walls with hipped clay tile roofs. The two storey property has two further extensions to the rear dating from the 19th and 20th centuries. | II |
| Old Rectory Cottage; 52.30786°N 0.48590°W | — | 17th century | 17th century, two storey cottage of colour washed rough cast over a time frame, with a clay tile roof. A later brick extension to the rear of the property is present, alongside a 20th-century gabled brick porch. | II |
| Elm Farmhouse; 52.30976°N 0.45518°W | — | c1600 | Timber framed farmhouse, that has been partly rebuilt with brick, covered in colour washed rough cast. The main structure is two storeys, and there is a single storey outbuilding to the rear. | II |
| The Cottage Willow View; 52.31149°N 0.45847°W | — | 17th century | A pair of separate cottages both being one storey and constructed of timber framing. Willow View has red brick facing, whilst The Cottage has colour washed rough cast. | II |
| Lodge Farmhouse; 52.29653°N 0.46844°W | | c1600 | The 17th century cottage has colour washed rough cast on a timber frame, with brick facing to the east gable end, under a clay tile roof. The 2 storey T-plan building has a 19th-century one storey, red brick pantiled extension at the rear. | II |
| Dalton Cottage; 52.29714°N 0.46600°W | | c1700 | One storey, thatched roof cottage of colour washed rough cast over timber frame. There exists a lean-to extension at the south gable end. | II |
| Dean House; 52.29623°N 0.46865°W | — | Early 19th century | Early 19th century house with rendered walls and a hipped slate roof. The structure consists of a 2-storey block, with a lower, also two storey wing to the northeast. | II |
| Chestnut Farmhouse; 52.30849°N 0.45388°W | — | 17th century | One storey farmhouse of colour washed rough cast on a timber frame, with a thatched roof. | II |
| Dean House Farmhouse; 52.29824°N 0.46814°W | — | 16th century | 16th century farmhouse of colour washed rough cast on a timber frame, topped with an old clay tile roof. The main structure is a two-storey H-plan, that has been latterly extended to the rear. Inside, one of the ground floor rooms has 17th century oak panelling with bas relief figured and foliate carving. | II |
| Farmbuilding, North of Farmhouse, Dean House Farm; 52.29851°N 0.46806°W | — | Late 17th to early 18th century | Timber framed barn with some plaster and red brick infill, that is potentially the remains of a longer building. The barn has a corrugated iron steeped pitch roof. | II |
| House North East of Chestnut Farmhouse; 52.30869°N 0.45367°W | — | 17th century | 17th century, thatched roof house, constructed from colour washed rough cast over a timber frame. The main building is two storeys, with a one-storey extension to the northeast elevation. | II |
| Upper Dean Windmill; 52.30151°N 0.47555°W | | 1850 | Disused windmill, built in 1850 of red brick. The windmill stands at 46 feet in height, and originally had three floors which have now collapsed. It last worked in 1906, and now serves as a shelter for cattle. | II |
| Orchard Cottages; 52.29742°N 0.46855°W | — | 17th century | Pair of 17th century, single storey cottages, of colour washed brick and rough cast on a timber frame. Number 1 has a thatched roof, whereas number 2 has 20th century roof tiles. There is a single storey lean-to extension on the south elevation. | II |
| Brook End; 52.29706°N 0.46914°W | — | 17th century | One storey, timber-frame cottage, with colour washed plaster infill to the first floor, and 20th century brick infill to the ground floor. The property has a thatched roof, with 20th century extensions to the rear and south gable end. The entrance to the property is at the rear, through a 20th-century porch. | II |
| Dean Croft; 52.29754°N 0.46848°W | — | 17th century | 18th century colour washed rough cast cottage, over a timber frame and brick. The roof is thatched, with a colour washed brick ridge stack and external south gable end stack. | II |
| The Three Compasses Public House; 52.29714°N 0.47277°W | | c1700 | Public house of colour washed brick and rough cast on a timber frame, with weatherboarding on the north end. Thatched roof over two storeys. | II |
| Church of All Saints; 52.29692°N 0.46643°W | | 14th century | 14th century parish church, of coursed limestone rubble with ashlar dressings. The west tower is of three stages with an octagonal spire with lucarnes, a plain parapet with grotesque heads beneath, and gargoyles. North and south chapels were added in the 15th century. In terms of interior, there are medieval wooden fixtures and a Jacobean gate to rood screen. The pews are also substantially medieval. | I |
| United Reformed Church; 52.29968°N 0.46394°W | | 1863 | Formerly an independent chapel, the building now serves the United Reformed Church. It is constructed of polychrome brick, with some stone dressings, and has a slate roof over. All of the elevations are articulated with Corinthian pilasters, and the doorway has a semi-circular arch on Corinthian columns. | II |
| Gramyre House; 52.30853°N 0.48416°W | — | 17th century | 17th century, two storey red brick house. It has a modern machine tile roof, with the addition of a 20th-century front porch. | II |
