= Listed buildings in Cardington, Bedfordshire =

Cardington is a civil parish in Bedford, Bedfordshire, England. It contains 32 listed buildings that are recorded in the National Heritage List for England. Of these, none are listed at Grade I, the highest of the three grades, one is listed at Grade II*, the middle grade and, the others are at Grade II, the lowest grade.

== Key ==
Grade	Criteria
I	Buildings of exceptional interest, sometimes considered to be internationally important
II*	Particularly important buildings of more than special interest
II	Buildings of national importance and special interest

== Buildings ==
Name and location	Photograph	Date	Notes	Grade
270 and 271, Bedford Road; 52.11993°N 0.41691°W	—	1763	Pair of cottages constructed in 1763 and restored in 1909. Consisting of a pebbledashed timber-frame, with a clay tiled roof. Each cottages consists of 2 storeys of 2 rooms each, with a red-brick chimney stack on the central ridge, and an additional chimney stack at the north gable end.	II
272, 273 and 274, Bedford Road; 52.11902°N 0.41597°W	—	17th century	Set of 3 two-storey cottages, consisting of a pebbledashed exterior over a timber frame construction. There is a red-brick double ridge chimney stack, and a further red brick stack at the north gable end.	II
Malting Farmhouse and No. 275 Bedford Road; 52.11829°N 0.41550°W	—	1771	Built for Samuel Whitbread, potentially incorporating an earlier building on the site. Number 275 is of a two-storey L-plan construction, consisting of red brick with a pebbledashed exterior, forming a courtyard with the adjoining farmhouse.	II
Barn to Rear of Malting Farmhouse; 52.11784°N 0.41648°W	—	17th century	17th century timber framed barn with red brick infill, with the addition of a corrugated asbestos roof.	II
Pleasant Place; 52.11816°N 0.41511°W	—	17th century	17th century in origin, with multiple later extensions. The main structure consists of chequered brick, with portions containing timebering and colour wash. Clay tile roof over two storeys.	II
Methodist Chapel; 52.12091°N 0.40448°W	—	1825	Methodist chapel of a red brick construction under a slate roof.	II
Parish Church of St Mary the Virgin; 52.11872°N 0.41461°W		15th century	The church consists of 15th century elements, however was largely rebuilt in the late 19th century. The original elements consist coursed limestone rubble with ashlar dressings, with the later elements of grit stone, with Ketton stone dressings.	II
Trinity House; 52.11871°N 0.41350°W	—	1781	A former vicarage, now private residence, built from two storeys of red brick under a hipped old clay tile roof.	II
Stables to Trinity House; 52.11845°N 0.41363°W	—	Late 18th century	Two storey stable block of 18th century origins with 19th century alterations. Red brick with a clay tile roof, containing three stables on the ground floor.	II
Howard's House; 52.11951°N 0.41467°W	—	18th century	Main block of the house consists of colour washed rough cast over brick, with the 19th and 20th century blocks of red brick with only the front elevations being roughcast rendered, all under a clay tile roof. Interior retains some original features, including panelling, the staircase and chimney pieces.	II*
Statue in Garden of Howard's House; 52.11951°N 0.41467°W	—	18th century	Lead figure depicting a boy ice skating accompanied by a running dog and game birds. Situated on a stone pedestal.	II
Observatory in Grounds of Howard's House; 52.11951°N 0.41467°W	—	19th century	Single storey red brick octagonal block, with a painted metal roof.	II
316, 317 and 318, Cople Road; 52.11842°N 0.41065°W	—	c1700	Set of three cottages restored in 1913. Two storeys consisting of pebbledash over timer-frame and a clay tile roof. Two ridge chimney stacks, both constructed of red brick.	II
319, The Green; 52.11781°N 0.41299°W	—	1784	Two storey, red brick house with a clay tile roof. Single storey outhouse of red brick and a clay tile roof, to the rear of the main building.	II
297, Southill Road; 52.11683°N 0.41322°W	—	17th century	Two storey timber framed cottage with a roughcast exterior and old clay tile roof. Additional lean-to situated at the rear.	II
Cardington Railway Station; 52.11403°N 0.41776°W		Late 19th century	Late 19th century unused railway station of a yellow gault brick with polychrome brick dressings construction. Of a simplified Venetian Gothic style the structure consists of a main block of 2 storeys and a single-storey 5-bay block to the southeast in a T-plan layout.	II
K6 Telephone Kiosk to South West of Whitbread Almshouses; 52.11993°N 0.41691°W		Mid 20th century	K6 Type public telephone kiosk, of a cast iron construction.	II
Cardington Bridge; 52.12311°N 0.41888°W	—	1778	The bridge consists of 5 segmental arches of various types of bricks, with stone keystones and parapet copings.	II
326, Church Lane; 52.11938°N 0.41517°W		1762	Two-room plan, two storey timber frame with a colour washed roughcast exterior. Central red brick ridge stack, and a lean-to addition to the rear.	II
The Kings Arms Public House; 52.11777°N 0.41267°W		1783	The building, although dated to 1783, potentially incorporates an earlier building on the site, and also has a number of later additions. Red brick construction with colour washed roughcast on the front elevation, and an old clay tile roof. At the northwest side, there is an early 19th century L-plan stable block, of roughcast and colour washed, with a gambrel roof. And to the northeast and southeast are various later 19th and 20th century additions of red brick.	II
Parish Cottage Parish Hall; 52.11657°N 0.41431°W	—	1862	Originally an industrial school and mistress's house, the property now functions as a parish hall and private dwelling. Constructed of red brick with dressings partly of yellow brick partly ashlar under a slate roof. The house consists of two storeys, with the Single-storeyed schoolroom block projecting to the west.	II
The Cottage Whitbread Almshouses; 52.11832°N 0.41408°W	—	1764	Two storey cottage, of colour washed roughcast over timber frame, and an old clay tile roof.	II
314 and 315, Cople Road; 52.11856°N 0.41037°W	—	18th century	Pair of 18th century cottages that were restored in 1913. Clay tile roof, with a two storey pebbledash over timber frame construction. Lean-to addition at the rear of the property.	II
276, The Green; 52.11788°N 0.41493°W	—	18th century	The two storey house is constructed of red brick with an old clay tile roof. There is a single storey block projecting from the rear. The building previously served as the village school and school master's house, however now functions as a private dwelling.	II
323 and 324, Church Lane; 52.11850°N 0.41390°W	—	18th century	Originally a pair of cottages, the building is now a single, two storey house. It consists of colourwashed roughcast and an old clay tile roof.	II
R101 Monument in Cardington Cemetery; 52.11951°N 0.41637°W		1930–31	The monument consists of a large stone tomb chest on top of a three-tiered base. It commemorates the victims of the R101 disaster, and was designed by Sir Albert Richardson.	II
325, Church Lane; 52.11916°N 0.41422°W	—	1762	The structure was previously a pair of almshouses, but is now a singular dwelling. It consists of colour washed roughcast over a timber frame on a high red brick plinth, with an old clay tile roof.	II
Monument in Garden of Howard's House; 52.11982°N 0.41383°W	—	1812	The monument consists of a stone vale situated on a raised pedestal. It was erected by Samuel Whitbread in order to commemorate the laying out of the gardens in 1762.	II
298, Cople Road; 52.11908°N 0.40824°W	—	17th century	Timber framed 17th century house, with a pebbledashed exterior and a clay tile roof. There is a later addition of a one storey wing projecting from the rear.	II
280, 281 and 282, The Green; 52.11746°N 0.41412°W	—	1757	Originally built as a workhouse, the structure is now three cottages. Number 280 and 281 are of colour washed rough cast, whilst number 282 is of red brick, possibly encasing a timber frame. All are of two storeys and an attic, with a clay tile roof.	II
Whitbread Almshouses; 52.11823°N 0.41393°W	—	1787	A set of 4 almshouses, constructed of red brick and an old clay tile roof. The set was originally in two separate blocks, however a late 19th century addition now links the two pairs.	II
Cardington War Memorial; 52.11935°N 0.41663°W		1920	The memorial was originally intended to commemorate those killed in the First World War, with later additions relating to the Second World War. It consists of a Latin cross bearing a bronze sword on its front face. The cross rises from a tapering shaft situated on top of an octagonal plinth and a two-stepped base.	II
