= Listed buildings in Pavenham =

Pavenham is a civil parish in Bedford, Bedfordshire, England. It contains 44 listed buildings that are recorded in the National Heritage List for England. Of these, one is listed at Grade I, the highest of the three grades and the others are at Grade II, the lowest grade.

== Key ==
Grade	Criteria
I	Buildings of exceptional interest, sometimes considered to be internationally important
II*	Particularly important buildings of more than special interest
II	Buildings of national importance and special interest

== Buildings ==
Name and location	Photograph	Date	Notes	Grade
Pavenham Court and Stable Lodge; 52.19271°N 0.55161°W	—	c1860	A former stable block and coach house for the now demolished Pavenham Bury, that have been converted to form two separate dwellings. Constructed mainly of coursed limestone rubble, with the rear wing of gault brick. An old clay tile roof tops the mixed one and two-storey building, which is arranged around three sides of a central courtyard, plus the additional rear wing. The ground floor has three large, shallow carriage arches, which are now blocked up with windows inserted.	II
West End Farmhouse; 52.18715°N 0.56737°W	—	Late 16th to early 17th century	The farmhouse is of coursed limestone rubble and has a clay tile roof. It is arranged in a two-storey H-plan, with one central gabled dormer. There is an open-sided, 19th-century, timber porch projecting from the central block.	II
Barn to East of West End Farmhouse; 52.18721°N 0.56702°W	—	18th century	A small 18th-century barn of coursed limestone rubble under an old clay tile roof, with a full-height doorway in the west elevation.	II
Derwent Cottages; 52.18848°N 0.55759°W	—	17th century	A row of cottages of 17th-century origin, originally built as a parish workhouse and overseer's house. All of two storeys, there is a terrace of four, followed by a slightly offset lower pair that now acts as a single dwelling. They are constructed of course limestone rubble with some remains of old lime render, along with an old clay tile roof. Single-storey lean-to extensions were added to the east elevation in the 19th to 20th century.	II
Anglestones; 52.18826°N 0.55345°W	—	17th century	Anglestones is a house a former barn that has been altered and extended in the 20th century, through the addition of a central gabled wing on the south elevation. The main block is of a single storey of coursed limestone rubble, and a roof of thatch and 20th-century tiles. The west wing is the former barn that has now been converted to residential use. Inside, there remains medieval re-used timbers and painted glass, alongside a Jacobean staircase.	II
West Cottage; 52.18876°N 0.55253°W	—	Late 17th to early 18th century	The house is of coursed limestone construction underneath a thatched roof with tile gable coping. The main block is of two storeys, and there is a one-storey addition to the south gable end constructed from rubble with a clay tile roof.	II
Former Pavenham Lower School; 52.18899°N 0.55226°W	—	1853	A former school building, which is now a private residence. It is of a single-storey L-plan built in roughly squared coursed limestone, and has a clay tile roof with stone gable coping and moulded kneelers. The central projecting wing has a crow-stepped gable and corner buttresses, surmounted by an ashlar bell turret. The west gable end also has a small gabled bell canopy.	II
The Leys; 52.18936°N 0.55137°W	—	Late 17th to early 18th century	A coursed limestone rubble house of two storeys with a clay tile roof. There is a 20th-century additional porch, alongside and rear outshut probably of 19th-century origin.	II
Hillside; 52.18964°N 0.54915°W	—	Late 16th to early 17th century	A coursed limestone rubble house, partly roughcast rendered, but all colourwashed. There is a clay tile roof over the single storey, a central chimney stack of stone with a rebuilt brick top, and a north stack of early small bricks.	II
Thatched Barn to Bartlemas Barn; 52.18939°N 0.54661°W	—	18th century	The 18th-century barn is constructed from coursed limestone rubble with weatherboarding in the apex in the gable ends. It has a thatched roof, with a gable end facing the road. There a are a set of double, full height doors in the east elevation.	II
The Retreat; 52.18889°N 0.55890°W	—	17th century	The two-storey house is of coursed limestone rubble with a clay pantile roof. There are two red brick gable dormers, and the gables above two of the first floor casement windows have mock Tudor framing.	II
The Smithy; 52.18867°N 0.55496°W	—	18th century	Of a coursed limestone rubble construction, the 18th-century house is of one storey and has a clay tile roof over.	II
Hill Farmhouse; 52.18943°N 0.55217°W	—	17th century	The house is constructed from coursed limestone rubble, with a 19th-century west-projecting wing of brick and pebbledash. It consists of two storeys with a clay tile roof covering. There is a late Victorian gabled porch with rendered plinth walls and timber baluster post. The south end was rebuilt in circa 1860, alongside a rear wing being added.	II
Candlemas; 52.18964°N 0.54527°W	—	17th century	A 17th-century house of coursed limestone rubble with a clay tile roof over the two-storey building. The house has a central doorway with a 19th-century bracketed pedimented doorhood. The property was altered and extended in the 19th and 20th centuries.	II
Amery; 52.18740°N 0.55442°W	—	18th century	An altered 18th-century, coursed limestone rubble house, of two storeys with an old clay tile roof.	II
Gate Piers and Quadrant Walls to The Lodge; 52.18911°N 0.54152°W		Mid-19th century	The plain square piers are of 19th-century origin, and are attached to coursed limestone rubble walls that form a semi-circle to another set of rubble piers. The piers are topped with moulded stone caps and the walls are topped with stone coping - some parts being flat, and some curved.	II
1 and 2, Church Lane; 52.18958°N 0.55139°W	—	18th century	A pair of 18th-century cottages, with a 19th-century extension to the north gable end. The whole structure is one storey of coursed limestone rubble with colour washed render to number 2. Number 1 has a modern concrete tile roof, whilst number 2 has clay peg tiles.	II
Parish Church of St Peter; 52.19291°N 0.55099°W		14th century	The parish church is of coursed limestone rubble, with most of the surviving elements being of 14th century in origin. A major repair scheme was initiated in the 1840s, including: the addition of a steeply pitched roof to the chancel, the remodelling of the south transept, a new roof on the new chapel, and a new vestry in 1847. Inside, the church is full of Jacobean carved panelling collected by a local landowner.	I
Roadside Barn to West End Farm; 52.18712°N 0.56702°W	—	18th century	The barn is of coursed limestone rubble with a corrugated iron roof. It has stone gable coping with moulded kneelers.	II
Thatched Barn to Moor Farm; 52.18861°N 0.55859°W	—	17th to 18th century	Coursed limestone rubble barn with a thatched roof. There is a modern plaque on the south elevation claiming that John Bunyan preached at the barn.	II
The Thatched Cottage; 52.18856°N 0.55776°W	—	17th century	A 17th-century cottage, with an additional bay of a later date, constructed from coursed limestone rubble. There is a thatched roof covering the single-storey building, with the east end being hipped, and the thatch is cut out over two attic casement windows. There is a lean-to conservatory to the right-hand side of the building.	II
Monk's Row; 52.18846°N 0.55686°W	—	18th century	A range of coursed limestone rubble cottages of two storeys, under an old clay tile roof with the gable end facing the road.	II
The Old Bakery; 52.18886°N 0.55254°W	—	17th century	17th-century, two-storey coursed limestone rubble house that now has a concrete pantile tile roof.	II
Wayside and Village Shop; 52.18914°N 0.55205°W		18th century	The two-storey building consists of a cottage and former village post office (now a further cottage), constructed from coursed limestone rubble with a concrete tile roof. The front elevation has a pair of 19th-century doorcases with gabled hoods over.	II
Hill Cottage; 52.18959°N 0.54991°W	—	17th century	Of 17th-century origin, the datestone with the exact date has been obliterated. It is constructed from coursed limestone rubble, and the two-storey building is topped with an old clay tile roof, which has two large gables over first floor windows. There is a 20th-century gabled porch on the ground floor.	II
The Dale Including Attached Barn; 52.18951°N 0.54725°W	—	17th century	A house and attached barn of coursed limestone rubble under an old clay tile roof. The main house consists of two storeys, with a later addition of a gable projecting wing to the west end also of two storeys. The east end has a number of outbuildings that are attached to the main block. There is a further block of one storey, and the barn is also of a single storey with tiled gable coping.	II
The White House; 52.18932°N 0.54545°W	—	17th century	The house is of one storey with an old clay tile roof over a coursed limestone rubble construction. There is a large, central red brick chimney stack, with a gable end facing the road. The main entrance into the property is on the right-hand side of the block.	II
18-21, High Street; 52.18870°N 0.55641°W	—	Mid-18th century	A row of limestone rubble houses, consisting of one storey with a gabled old clay tile roof. There are three red brick ridge stacks, and later outshuts to the rear of the houses.	II
Dunelm Cottage; 52.18888°N 0.55279°W	—	17th century	A 17th-century house that was extended by two bays to the east in the 19th century. It consists of two storeys of coursed limestone rubble underneath a clay tile roof. A further one-storey addition is also present to the west elevation.	II
Barn to Rear of Pear Tree Cottage; 52.18897°N 0.55308°W	—	18th century	The barn is constructed of coursed limestone rubble, but was heightened in the 19th century with red brick. It is topped with a clay pantile roof.	II
Buttery to Hill Farm; 52.18970°N 0.55225°W	—	Late 19th century	The building was formerly the buttery for the related farm. It is a small rectangular building of coursed limestone rubble with red brick dressings, and a pyramid roof of banded plain and fishscale clay tiles.	II
Sedrup and Ousel Cottages; 52.18776°N 0.55411°W	—	Late 17th to early 18th century	A pair of houses with Sedrup Cottage being of slightly earlier origins than the other. Sedrup Cottage consists of colour washed coursed limestone rubble with a thatched roof. Ousel Cottage is of coursed limestone rubble under a clay tile roof, with the east elevation being pebbledashed. Both dwellings consist of a single storey. To the east elevation of Sedrup Cottage is a large flat-roofed, single-storey extension; whilst the south elevation Ousel Cottage has a further one-storey extension, and lean-to porch.	II
36-40, Mill Lane; 52.18701°N 0.55402°W	—	17th century	A long terrace of two-storey houses, consisting of coursed limestone rubble and a thatched roof. A gabled porch is present to the rear of number 37.	II
Walled Garden to North of Garden Cottage; 52.19294°N 0.55283°W	—	19th century	Consists of a garden wall attached to bothies and a greenhouse range. The wall is constructed of red brick that is mostly laid in English bond, with a top of Flemish bond. The bothies are of coursed rubblestone and brick, with Welsh slate roofs; whilst the greenhouses are of glass on top of dwarf brick walls. The garden is almost triangular in shape, with two entrances of keyed flat brick arches and wooden board doors located in the southwest corner. Set at three metre intervals on the outside of the wall are evenly-spaced raked buttresses, The eastern portion of the wall has lean-to bothies on the outer side, and lean-to greenhouses on the inner. There is a small brick addition to the west end of the greenhouse range.	II
K6 Telephone Kiosk at Junction of Weavers Lane (East Side) and High Street; 52.18922°N 0.55234°W	—	c1935	Type K6 telephone box, as designed by Sir Giles Gilbert Scott. Cast iron frame with square windows and a domed roof.	II
Cherry Cottage; 52.18863°N 0.55288°W	—	17th century	Oringinally a pair of 17th-century houses, the building is now a single single dwelling of coursed limestone rubble. The east two bays were heightend with brick in the 19th century making them two storeys, whilst the remainder of the structure is a single storey. The house has a thatched roof, and the main entrance is situated away from the road on the south elevation. There is a central projecting wing also of a single storey of coursed rubble and a thatched roof, alongside a 20th-century lean-to stone entrance lobby to the east end, and a 20th-century one-storey extension to the west elevation.	II
The Willows; 52.18817°N 0.55384°W		Late 17th to early 18th century	A coursed limestone rubble house that is partly rendered on the southeast elevation, and colour washed to the northwest elevation. The house is laid out as a two-storey T-plan, with the cross-wing at the northeast end. The entrance is at the southeast elevation, covered with a 20th-century gabled porch. There is a single-storey, 19th-century extension on the southwest end, consisting of colour washed brick with a slate roof.	II
The Folly; 52.18940°N 0.54612°W	—	1691	Two-storey house of coursed limestone rubble and a modern concrete tile roof, with the gable end facing the road. A 19th-century extension is present on the south en.	II
Pear Tree Cottage; 52.18905°N 0.55271°W	—	18th century	Originally a pair of cottages, that have now been converted into a single dwelling of two storeys. It is constructed from coursed limestone rubble underneath a clay tile roof. Two doorways are still extant, with the right hand one having a gabled bracketed doorhood over it.	II
Lamas Barn; 52.18957°N 0.54531°W		Late 17th to early 18th century	A threshing barn, now converted into a residence, constructed from coursed limestone rubble and a clay tile roof with stone gable coping. The gable end faces the road with triangular ventilation holes on both gables.	II
The Lodge; 52.18921°N 0.54137°W		Mid-19th century	The building was built to serve as the lodge to the now demolished Pavenham Bury, but is now a private dwelling. It consists of a single storey of coursed limestone rubble, with a fishscale tile roof. The gable end faces towards the road with the cross-wing situated at the north end, and there are two ashlar chimney stacks rising from the roof with paired octagonal flutes. On the west elevation, there is an open-sided timber porch built into the angle with the cross-wing, alongside a 20th-century brick extension on the eastern elevation.	II
Vine Cottage; 52.18933°N 0.55285°W	—	18th century	A cottage consistsing of coursed limestone rubble, with an old clay tile roof covering the two-storey building. To the north there is a outbuilding that has been heightened to two storeys with red brick, with a concrete tile roof.	II
Garden Cottage; 52.19252°N 0.55235°W	—	c1860	An estate cottage of coursed limestone rubble with ashlar dressings. It is of an L-plan arrangement with a single storey, and is topped by a clay tile roof with moulded stone eaves brackets. The doorway is located in the centre of the front face, with a gabled openwork hood on stone pilasters covering it.	II
The Cottage; 52.18861°N 0.55844°W	—	17th century	A coursed limestone rubble house that was heightened to two storeys with red brick in the 19th century, although there remains a lower bay, which was originally stables, to the east end of one storey. The roof is of concrete tiles.	II
