= Listed buildings in Colmworth =

Colmworth is a civil parish in Bedford, Bedfordshire, England. It contains 23 listed buildings that are recorded in the National Heritage List for England. Of these, one is listed at Grade I, the highest of the three grades, one is listed at Grade II*, the middle grade and, the others are at Grade II, the lowest grade.

== Key ==
Grade	Criteria
I	Buildings of exceptional interest, sometimes considered to be internationally important
II*	Particularly important buildings of more than special interest
II	Buildings of national importance and special interest

== Buildings ==
Name and location	Photograph	Date	Notes	Grade
Finsbury Park Farmhouse; 52.19687°N 0.37266°W	—	17th century	17th century farmhouse consisting of colour washed rough cast over a timber frame, with a thatched roof. One storey construction, with a further one storey lean-to addition to the rear of colour washed brick, weatherboarding and a corrugated iron roof.	II
Channels End Farm House; 52.19670°N 0.37671°W	—	17th century	One storey, T-plan cottage constructed from colour washed rough cast over a timber frame, with a thatched roof To the northeast of the main structure, there is an additional garage.	II
Pair of Cottages South of Ye Olde Homestead; 52.21046°N 0.38772°W	—	18th century	A pair of cottages, that were potentially originally built as a singular dwelling. Colour washed rough cast over a timber frame, with a pantiled roof. The main structure is one storey, with additional lean-tos at both gable ends.	II
Church Farmhouse; 52.21604°N 0.37782°W	—	17th century	17th century farmhouse of a colour washed rough cast over timber-frame construction. The farmhouse is laid out in a L-plan with two storeys, except the north wing being one storey, all under an old clay tile roof. There is a large external chimney breast, and a 19th-century brick and pantiled outhouse addition to the south of the main structure.	II
Moat House; 52.21471°N 0.37871°W	—	Mid-19th century	Now a private dwelling, the house is the former rectory for the parish church. It is constructed of yellow gault brick, under a hipped slate roof. The main structure consists of two storeys, and there is a 20th-century addition of a lean-to at the north elevation.	II
Parish Church of St Denys; 52.11993°N 0.41691°W		Medieval	Parish church with an unknown date or origin. The chancel is constructed from cobblestones, with coursed freestone rubble elsewhere. The tower is on the west side, and consists of four stages with diagonal buttresses, and an octagonal spire with a lucarnes.	I
Manor Farmhouse; 52.21401°N 0.37993°W		1609	Farmhouse constructed in 1609 for Katherine Doyley Dyer on the site of a previous manor house. Construction is of colour washed brick and rough cast over a timber frame, with an old clay tile roof. The building is laid out in a T-plan with two storeys, with later additional single storey brick structures on the south elevation.	II
Dovecote at Manor Farm, North of Farmhouse; 52.21443°N 0.37979°W		17th century	Construction is of a close-studded timber frame with red brick infill, topped with a hipped old clay tile roof.	II
Barn North East of House, Manor Farm; 52.21429°N 0.37942°W	—	18th century	Timber framed barn with red brick infill, with the east elevation being weatherboarded, and a pantiled roof over.	II
Rockery; 52.21955°N 0.37598°W	—	17th century	The cottage consists of colour washed rough cast over timber frame, with a pantiled roof. The main structure is one storey, with lean-to brick additions to the south and east elevations.	II
City Farmhouse; 52.21978°N 0.37493°W	—	17th century	17th century timber-framed house with a pebbledashed exterior, and 20th century tiled roof. The main structure is laid out in a one-storey L-plan, with further 20th century extensions to the rear.	II
House Opposite the Bungalow; 52.21702°N 0.37847°W	—	18th century	Timber-framed house with red brick ground floor and north gable end, and rendered first floor. Old clay tile roof over two storeys. There is an additional red brick lean-to at the rear of the property.	II
Rose Cottage; 52.21885°N 0.38055°W	—	18th century	18th century timer framed cottage, with numerous 20th and 21st century additions and alterations. Despite this the core original structure remains intact.	II
The Thatched Cottage; 52.20362°N 0.39134°W	—	17th century	17th century two storey thatched roof cottage, with colour washed rough cast over a timber frame.	II
Low Farmhouse; 52.19745°N 0.39038°W		Early 17th century	Originally a farmhouse, the structure is now divided into two dwellings. Set out in one storey H-plan, it is constructed from colour washed rough cast over a timber frame, with an old clay tile roof.	II*
Farm Building on North Side of Yard About 70 Metres North North East of Manor Farmhouse; 52.21459°N 0.37938°W		18th century	The original function for the building is uncertain, however it is constructed using Flemish bond red brick, and a plain tile roof with half-hipped ends.	II
Top Farmhouse; 52.20070°N 0.38922°W	—	Early 18th century	Early 18th century farmhouse, consisting of colour washed rough cast over a timber frame, and an old clay tile roof. The main structure is two storeys, and there is a one-storey colour washed brick lean-to added at the rear.	II
School Farmhouse; 52.21127°N 0.38660°W	—	17th century	Timber framed farmhouse with pebbledashed exterior, under a thatched roof. One storey in nature, there are further one storey 20th century extensions to the west and north elevations.	II
The White Cottage; 52.21658°N 0.37750°W	—	c1700	Timber-framed cottage with colour washed roughcast, and a 20th-century tiled roof. One storey main structure, with an additional lean-to at the rear.	II
Home Close; 52.21806°N 0.37946°W	—	18th century	Potentially originally constructed as a pair of cottages, it is now a single dwelling. Consists of colour washed rouqh cast over a timber frame and a thatched roof. Main structure consists of one storey, with other single storey additions at the rear.	II
The Wheatsheaf Public House; 52.20402°N 0.39093°W		17th century	Former public house, now a restaurant. Consists of colour washed brick and rough cast over a timber frame, under a part clay tile, part concrete tile roof. 20th century extensions at the west gable end.	II
Granary at Colgro Farm, 500 Metres South of Junction; 52.19929°N 0.37673°W	—	18th century	Timber framed granary on a red brick infill, and with red brick infill. It has a corrugated iron roof, over one storey, with further one storey additions to the north and east elevations.	II
Channel's End Farmhouse, 1 Kilometre South of Junction; 52.19476°N 0.37752°W	—	17th century	Farmhouse of 17th century origin, consisting of colour washed rough cast over a timber frame, with an old clay tile roof.	II
