= Listed buildings in Cotton End =

Cotton End is a civil parish in Bedford, Bedfordshire, England. It contains 6 listed buildings that are recorded in the National Heritage List for England. Of these, none are listed at Grade I, the highest of the three grades, one is listed at Grade II*, the middle grade and, the others are at Grade II, the lowest grade.

== Key ==
Grade	Criteria
I	Buildings of exceptional interest, sometimes considered to be internationally important
II*	Particularly important buildings of more than special interest
II	Buildings of national importance and special interest

== Buildings ==
Name and location	Photograph	Date	Notes	Grade
Manor Farmhouse; 52.09798°N 0.41786°W	—	Late 16th century	Late 16th century house of red brick with stone dressings. The house retains its thatched roof, and was originally in a two storey H-plan, with the south cross-wing since been destroyed. There is a single storey outhouse addition to rear, in red brick and clay roof tile. Inside, the ground floor has an elaborate plaster ceiling, probably from the early 17th century.	II*
The Bell Public House; 52.09584°N 0.41741°W		17th century	17th century timer framed public house, with colour washed rough cast exterior. The pub is laid out in a L-plan, with one storey under a thatched roof. To the rear, there is a 20th century single storey block connecting to a further thatched one storey block, which was originally an outhouse.	II
8 and 10, Bell Lane; 52.09611°N 0.41639°W	—	18th century	Pair of timber framed cottages, with a colour washed roughcast exterior, and clay tile roof. Each cottage is of a two storey, one-room plane.	II
21, High Road; 52.09905°N 0.41951°W		Early to mid-18th century	Timberframed house, refronted in pebbledash in the 20th century, with a tiled roof and end brick chimney stacks. The interior has exposed beams and floor joists, along with a red brick bread oven.	II
Dovecote at Manor Farmhouse; 52.09843°N 0.41704°W	—	18th century	Red brick dovecote with a hipped old clay tile roof. Inside, there are nesting boxes built into the brickwork.	II
Herring's Green Farmhouse; 52.08841°N 0.41614°W	—	1786	Rebuilding of an earlier house on the site. Two storeys of red brick, rendered at basement level, with a clay tile roof. Restored in the 20th century, replacing a number of wooden and stone features.	II
