= Listed buildings in Knotting and Souldrop =

Knotting and Souldrop is a civil parish in Bedford, Bedfordshire, England. It contains 23 listed buildings that are recorded in the National Heritage List for England. Of these, one is listed at Grade I, the highest of the three grades, one is listed at Grade II*, the middle grade and, the others are at Grade II, the lowest grade.

== Key ==
Grade	Criteria
I	Buildings of exceptional interest, sometimes considered to be internationally important
II*	Particularly important buildings of more than special interest
II	Buildings of national importance and special interest

== Buildings ==
Name and location	Photograph	Date	Notes	Grade
Knotting Fox Farmhouse; 52.25028°N 0.55425°W	—	18th century	Former inn, now in use as a private dwelling. Constructed of coursed limestone rubble, with red brick gable end stacks and a machine tile roof. A 19th century additional rear wing in red brick forms a T-plan layout. There is a further modern extension that is parallel to the front block, and the whole building is one storey throughout.	II
Knotting Green Cottages; 52.25149°N 0.52863°W		1861	Set of four terraced cottages constructed from red brick and an old clay tile roof with a slate ridge. There are three brick chimney stacks raising above the two storeys.	II
Strawberry Hill Cottages; 52.25219°N 0.52880°W	—	1868	A pair of single storey cottages, with stylistic features that suggest early 20th century modifications. The ground floor is of red brick, and the first floor is rendered with planted timbers. A large central multi-shafted chimney stack emerges through an old clay tile roof. A modern extension is present to the rear elevation.	II
Barns at Strawberry Hill Farm; 52.25249°N 0.52768°W	—	1872	A group of model farm buildings of red brick and slate roofs. There are three courtyards throughout, and a two-storey grain store at the rear of the main buildings.	II
Meadowcroft; 52.24501°N 0.55788°W		17th century	The house is of a limestone rubble construction with a new tile roof. The building has three rooms over a single storey.	II
Lambs Cottage; 52.24548°N 0.55865°W		17th century	A group of three cottages in two buildings of different periods. The south is two storeys of 17th century origin, limestone construction, with an attached former timber framed barn with brick infill. To the north east is a 17th or 18th century single storey cottage, with a large recent dormer projecting from the rear. This is of timber frame with brick infill and some limestone walling.	II
Village Hall and The Old School House; 52.24426°N 0.55677°W		1868	Village hall and former school block and attached school house. Constructed from gault brick and a tile roof, with some reconstituted stone dressings. Arranged in a T-plan, with a projecting entranceway on the right hand side.	II
Orchard Cottage; 52.24348°N 0.55756°W	—	Late 18th century	Late 18th century cottage of limestone rubble with a slate roof, and brick end stacks.	II
Manor Farmhouse; 52.25937°N 0.53231°W	—	c1774	A two-storey L-shaped farmhouse, with the main element dating from the mid-19th century, with an older part to the northeast. The newer block is rendered, with the 18th century part having a tiled roof of steeper pitch.	II
Strawberry Hill Cottages; 52.25196°N 0.52875°W	—	1868	A pair of cottages that are constructed from red brick, with a band of blue bricks at window head level, topped with an old clay tile roof. The main building is one storey tall, and there is a modern extension to the rear.	II
Church Farmhouse; 52.24380°N 0.55897°W		17th or 18th century	The two storey farmhouse was extended in the 19th century, with the earlier element consisting of limestone rubble, and the newer of chequered red brick. There is an old clay tile roof, which is hipped on the later part.	II
Cross Weir Farmhouse; 52.24645°N 0.55922°W	—	18th century	18th century farmhouse of two storeys, constructed from limestone rubble and an old clay tile roof. The house has stone end stacks with brick tops, and there is a modern extension to the south elevation.	II
5-7, High Street; 52.24506°N 0.55736°W	—	18th century	Three cottages in a terrace, all two storeys, of limestone rubble with a pantile roof. There is some modernisation and extensions to the row.	II
The Old Post Office; 52.24563°N 0.55802°W	—	Late 18th century	Late 18th century post office, now converted into a cottage. Consists of a limestone rubble construction, with a slate roof and brick gable end stacks. A modern porch projects from the front.	II
Church of All Saints; 52.24326°N 0.55845°W		Medieval	The parish church is of medieval origins, however was largely rebuilt in 1861 by Henry Clutton. It is of a limestone construction, with clay tiles on the roof. The tower dates to the 13th century, and has a broach spire with two tiers of lucarnes. The chancel contains a stone vault and paired side windows.	II*
K6 Telephone Kiosk Opposite Knotting Green Cottages; 52.25157°N 0.52845°W		c1935	Type K6 telephone box, as designed by Sir Giles Gilbert Scott. Cast iron frame with square windows and a domed roof.	II
Knotting Green Farmhouse; 52.24905°N 0.52903°W	—	Late 16th to early 17th century	The original building consists of a two-storey T-plan, with a 19th-century extension in one angle, and a porch in the other. Constructed from red brick in an early work English bond pattern, under a modern clay tile roof.	II
Strawberry Hill Farmhouse; 52.25198°N 0.52755°W	—	1868	The farmhouse is dated to 1868, and is of yellow gault brick with a hipped slate roof. Consisting of a two-storey square plan layout, there is a further gault brick and slate roofed outhouse to the east.	II
Parish Church of St Margaret; 52.26031°N 0.53244°W		12th century	A small parish church of 12th century origins, it is of limestone rubble construction with old clay tile roofs. Some renovation was undertaken by Henry Clutton in circa 1875. There is a two-stage unbutressed tower dated to 1615, and the interior puplit, benches, and chancel gates are of 17th century origin.	I
War Memorial; 52.26014°N 0.53245°W		Early 20th century	A World War One memorial of limestone with miniature shrine on a column. The shrine itself is four sided with a gable roof, and has four figures in each side. The octagonal column sits on a square base, itself on a two stepped ocatgonal plinth.	II
8-13, High Street; 52.24523°N 0.55756°W	—	1865	A row of six large houses, of red brick walls and a clay tile roof. The houses themselves are two storeys, and there is a block of outhouses at the rear.	II
The Rectory and Spinney Hill; 52.24073°N 0.55709°W	—	Late 17th century	A rectory of late 17th century origins, largely altered in the 19th century, and consisting of two storeys. Constructed of partly roughcast limestone rubble, underneath a Welsh slate roof. Spinney Hill was formerly part of The Rectory, however it is now a separate private, two storey, dwelling of limestone rubble and a Welsh slate roof.	II
Souldrop War Memorial; 52.24344°N 0.55807°W		1921	World War One memorial, with a further name added for the Second World War. It is located on the east side of the parish churchyard, and consists of a Latin cross with a carved collar upon a tapering octagonal column. The column is set upon an octagonal chamfered plinth on a single step square base.	II
