= Listed buildings in Harrold, Bedfordshire =

Harrold is a civil parish in Bedford, Bedfordshire, England. It contains 45 listed buildings that are recorded in the National Heritage List for England. Of these, one is listed at Grade I, the highest of the three grades, two are listed at Grade II*, the middle grade and, the others are at Grade II, the lowest grade.

== Key ==
| Grade | Criteria |
|---|---|
| I | Buildings of exceptional interest, sometimes considered to be internationally important |
| II* | Particularly important buildings of more than special interest |
| II | Buildings of national importance and special interest |

== Buildings ==
| Name and location | Photograph | Date | Notes | Grade |
|---|---|---|---|---|
| 31, Brook Lane; 52.20340°N 0.61265°W | — | 17th century | 17th century house, consisting of one storey of colourwashed coursed limestone rubble, under a thatched roof. | II |
| 2, Brook Lane; 52.20254°N 0.61212°W | — | Late 17th to early 18th century | The single storey house is constructed from coursed limestone rubble with a thatched roof. | II |
| The Old Vicarage; 52.20119°N 0.60682°W | — | 17th century | Former vicarage for the parish church, now in use as a private dwelling. The main block is of three storeys of coursed limestone rubble, with a Welsh slate roof. | II |
| Range of Farm Buildings 20 Metres to North East of Pointer's Lodge; 52.20040°N 0.60594°W | | 18th and 19th century | Range of farm buildings from the 18th and 19th centuries. Arranged in an L-plan, with the rear wall of the east block forming a boundary with the parish churchyard. Originally serving as a barn and stables, they are of coursed limestone rubble with pantile roofs. (Left building in image) | II |
| Pointer's Lodge; 52.20025°N 0.60628°W | | 19th century | 19th century house that abuts the tower of the parish church. Two storeys of coursed limestone rubble with an old clay tile roof. | II |
| Market House; 52.20108°N 0.61000°W | | Late 17th to early 18th century | Open octagonal shelter, formerly used as a market building. Simplified wooden doric posts, sat on bases of stone, support the conical tiled roof. On top, there is a octagonal cupola with miniature columns and a flatter pitched conical lead roof, crowned by a wrought iron weather-vane. | II |
| 5-11, The Green; 52.20092°N 0.60964°W | | 18th century | Terrace of two storey, 18th century houses, of coursed limestone rubble with a thatched roof. | II |
| Harrold Catholic Chapel; 52.20092°N 0.61048°W | | 17th century | Built as a school and adjoining schoolhouse, the building now serves as a private dwelling and Catholic chapel. It is of coursed limestone rubble construction, with a 20th century tiled roof over the one storey building. There are also two one storey extensions, projecting from the rear elevation. | II |
| 73 and 75, High Street; 52.20196°N 0.61308°W | — | Late 18th to early 19th century | Pair of two storey red brick houses, with a Welsh slate roof. | II |
| Greystones; 52.20198°N 0.60534°W | — | 1817 | The main house is of coursed stone rubble construction, with a modern concrete tile roof. There is an additional wing to the left side, which is cement rendered with a Welsh slate roof. | II |
| Maple Cottage The Maples; 52.20195°N 0.60605°W | — | Early 19th century | Coursed limestone rubble house with attached cottage, consisting of two storeys under a banded plain and fishscale tile roof. | II |
| 50, High Street; 52.20161°N 0.60748°W | — | Late 18th to early 19th century | Two storey house consisting of coursed limestone rubble that has been lime-and colourwashed, with an asbestos tile roof. | II |
| Magpie Public House; 52.20166°N 0.60775°W | — | 18th century | Former public house, now in use as a restaurant. Two storeys of coursed limestone rubble construction, and a clay tile roof with stone gable coping. | II |
| Barham House; 52.20145°N 0.60882°W | — | Late 18th century | Late 18th century house consisting of two storeys of coursed limestone rubble, and a Welsh slate roof with stone gable coping. | II |
| Quintin House; 52.20155°N 0.61087°W | — | 17th century | The house is laid out in a two storey, T-plan arrangement. It is constructed from coursed limestone rubble, and an old clay tile roof with stone gable coping. There is a shallow porch over the front door supported on doric columns. | II |
| 102-106, High Street; 52.20211°N 0.61228°W | | 18th century | Originally a terrace of 18th century houses, they are now in use as an extension of The Oakley Arms Public House. Single storey, of a coursed limestone rubble and thatched roof construction. | II |
| Gates and Gate Piers to the Mansion; 52.20177°N 0.61463°W | | 19th century | A pair of 19th century wrought iron gates with spearhead tops, flanked by a pair of stone piers surmounted by urn shaped finials. | II |
| Manor Farmhouse; 52.20282°N 0.63600°W | — | 19th century | A coursed limestone rubble farmhouse, consisting of two storeys under a Welsh slate roof and moulded stone eves. | II |
| 21-27, Brook Lane; 52.20330°N 0.61280°W | — | 18th century | A terrace of two storey, 18th century houses of coursed limestone rubble, with a Welsh slate roof. | II |
| 4, Dove Lane; 52.20206°N 0.60737°W | — | Early 19th century | Three storey coursed limestone rubble house, with a concrete tile roof. There are additional two storey extensions to the west and east elevations. | II |
| The Lock Up; 52.20073°N 0.60987°W | | Early 19th century | Formerly in use as a village lockup, it consists of a small circular building of coursed limestone rubble, and a steep conical stone roof topped with a moulded ball finial. | II |
| The Old Manor; 52.20138°N 0.60667°W | — | Late 16th to early 17th century | An L-plan manor house, with a red tile roof. The south wing consists of two storeys, with a later north wing of one storey. The interior retains an original overmantel of oak carved with arcaded panels and strapwork, along with a 17th century panelled partition. | II* |
| 119 and 121, High Street; 52.20046°N 0.61548°W | — | 18th century | A pair of 18th century houses, with two storeys of coursed limestone rubble walls, and a concrete tile roof with stone gable coping. | II |
| 48, High Street; 52.20162°N 0.60741°W | — | 18th century | Coursed limestone rubble walls that have been lime and colour washed. The main house is of two storeys with a thatched roof, whilst an extension on the right side has a pantiled roof. | II |
| 52, High Street; 52.20161°N 0.60757°W | — | Mid-19th century | Two storey house, with a ground floor of colourwashed coursed limestone rubble, and a first floor of colourwashed brick. All topped with a concrete tile roof. | II |
| Barn 40 Metres to North East of Number 76; 52.20172°N 0.61003°W | — | 18th century | 18th century stone barn, under a pantile roof with stone gable coping. The south elevation has double doors covered with a 20th century canopy. | II |
| Oakley Arms Public House; 52.20211°N 0.61228°W | — | 19th century | Two storey, coursed limestone rubble public house with a Welsh slate roof. On the right hand side is an additional brick wing set back slightly from the main block, with a hipped Welsh slate roof. | II |
| Harrold Lodge Farmhouse; 52.18761°N 0.63882°W | — | 1799 | Coursed limestone rubble farmhouse of two storeys, with a hipped tile roof on the right hand side, and stone gable coping to the left. | II |
| The Mansion; 52.20310°N 0.61522°W | — | 1619 | Mansion house of coursed limestone rubble, dated 1619 but restored and refaced in the 19th century. An old clay tile roof with stone gable coping covers the two storey building. | II |
| Dicken House; 52.20237°N 0.61309°W | — | Early 16th century | The house is of a U-shape plan, consisting of a central hall flanked by 18th-century north and south wings. The two-storey house has a steeply pitched clay tile gable roof, over a timber frame with wattle and daub and plaster infilling. The north gable end is of colour-washed brick, and the rear wings of rendered stone. Much of the ground floor interior framing has been lost to alterations, potentially stemming from when the building served as offices in the 20th century. | II |
| Mulberry Lodge; 52.20163°N 0.60833°W | — | Late 17th or early 18th century | It was originally a three-bay house, with two further bays later added to the left side. Construction is of coursed limestone rubble, with a thatched roof over the single store building. On the rear elevation, there is a slightly projecting gabled wing to the right side. | II |
| 118, High Street; 52.20209°N 0.61350°W | | 1721 | Two storeys of coursed limestone rubble, with a steeply pitched Welsh slate roof with tile gable coping. (First house on left in image). | II |
| Honeysuckle Cottage; 52.20067°N 0.60958°W | — | Late 17th to early 18th century | L-plan cottage of coursed limestone rubble now plastered over, with a thatched roof. The projecting gable wing is on the right hand side, and the building has two storeys throughout. | II |
| 67, High Street; 52.20166°N 0.61154°W | — | 1725 | Coursed limestone rubble house of three storeys, with a concrete tile roof. | II |
| 77 and 79, High Street; 52.20188°N 0.61346°W | — | Late 18th to early 19th century | Pair of houses of coursed limestone rubble. Two storeys tall, with Welsh slate roof with stone gable coping. There is a slightly recessed section in-between the two houses. | II |
| Harrold Bridge; 52.19738°N 0.60346°W | | Medieval | The date of construction for the bridge is unknown. The bridge is aligned north-south and spans over the River Great Ouse. Six arches span the river itself, followed by a further nine over the flood plain. | II* |
| North West Barn to Pointer's Lodge; 52.20043°N 0.60642°W | — | 17th century | 17th century barn of coursed limestone rubble and an old clay tile roof with stone gable coping. The entrance is under a timber lintel in the centre of the north elevation. There is a pantiled lean-to on the south elevation. | II |
| Parish Church of St Peter; 52.20001°N 0.60575°W | | 13th century | The earliest part of the parish church dates to the 13th century. Constructed of coursed limestone rubble, the tower dates from the 14th century, with an octagonal spire atop. | I |
| 1 and 3, The Green; 52.20106°N 0.60962°W | — | Early 19th century | Pair of two storey, early 19th century houses, of coursed limestone rubble and a Welsh slate roof. | II |
| 1, Church Walk; 52.20158°N 0.60700°W | — | 17th century | Colourwashed coursed limestone rubble house of one storey, with a thatched roof. | II |
| Nunswood; 52.20177°N 0.61406°W | — | 1726 | 18th century house constructed from coursed limestone rubble, with a Welsh slate roof. Laid out in an L-plan, with two storeys. | II |
| The Vine and Chepstow House; 52.20218°N 0.61300°W | — | Late 18th to early 19th century | Two storey house of two wings, set at right angles to each other. The road-facing wing is constructed from coursed limestone rubble, and a Welsh slate roof with stone gable coping. To the right is the recessed brick wing, also with a Welsh slate roof. | II |
| Priory Farmhouse; 52.19898°N 0.61873°W | — | Late 16th to early 17th century | Complex house of two storeys, laid out in a T-plan. The rear block is of coursed limestone rubble, with a heavy central brick chimney stack. The front projecting block is of 19th century origin and is pebbledash rendered. The first floor oversails the ground floor and is clad in mock timber framing. | II |
| 29, Brook Lane; 52.20341°N 0.61283°W | — | 17th century | Coursed limestone rubble house that has been partly rendered and colourwashed. One storey tall, it has a thatched roof with the gable end facing the road. | II |
| Harrold War Memorial; 52.20123°N 0.61029°W | | 1919 | The memorial was unveiled in 1919 by Lieutenant-Colonel Rouse Orlebar, to recognise those who died from the village during World War One; following the Second World War further names were added. It is constructed from Aberdeen granite and consists of a tapering square obelisk on top of a pedestal with a moulded collar and foot on a two-stepped base.It is enclosed by stone obelisk bollards linked with iron rails. | II |
