= Listed buildings in Cople =

Cople is a civil parish in Bedford, Bedfordshire, England. It contains 15 listed buildings that are recorded in the National Heritage List for England. Of these, one is listed at Grade I, the highest of the three grades and the others are at Grade II, the lowest grade.

== Key ==
| Grade | Criteria |
|---|---|
| I | Buildings of exceptional interest, sometimes considered to be internationally important |
| II* | Particularly important buildings of more than special interest |
| II | Buildings of national importance and special interest |

== Buildings ==
| Name and location | Photograph | Date | Notes | Grade |
|---|---|---|---|---|
| Parish Church of All Saints; 52.12353°N 0.38994°W | | 11th century | Parish church constructed mainly of course limstone rubble, with an ironstone tower. In the interior, the pews are from the late 16th century. | I |
| 5, Northill Road; 52.12315°N 0.38901°W | — | 17th century | Timber framed, single storey cottage with a pebbledashed exterior and a clay tile roof. | II |
| The Croft; 52.12294°N 0.38945°W | — | 17th century | One storey house constructed of colour washed rough cast over a timber frame. Additional lean-to to the rear of the property. | II |
| 47, Northill Road; 52.11980°N 0.38518°W | | 18th century | Single storey, thatched roof cottage of colour washed rough cast over timber-frame construction. There are 20th century additions at the rear. | II |
| 19, Water End; 52.11646°N 0.38754°W | — | 18th century | Formerly a pair of cottages, this is now a single dwelling. Consisting of one storey, the property has a thatched roof, and is formed from a timer frame with colour washed brick infill. | II |
| Bier House at No 1; 52.12400°N 0.38952°W | — | 19th century | Former 19th century bier house, of timber frame with red brick infill, under a clay tile roof. | II |
| 6 and 8, Willington Road; 52.12406°N 0.38922°W | — | c1600 | The house is constructed from colour washed rough cast over a timber frame, with the timbering exposed on one gable. An old clay tile roof tops the two storeys, and there is an additional two-storey wing projecting from the rear. | II |
| Dog House; 52.13056°N 0.39320°W | — | Early 19th century | Yellow brick two storey house, with two single storey projections at the rear. A hipped slate roof tops the main structure. | II |
| 10, Willington Road; 52.12427°N 0.38922°W | — | 18th century | 18th century time framed cottage, with a colour washed brick infill. The structure consists of a single storey topped with a clay tile roof. | II |
| Octagon Farmhouse; 52.13342°N 0.40155°W | — | Early 19th century | The house was constructed in the early 19th century for John Russell, 6th Duke of Bedford. The main block is in an octagonal formation, and is of a red brick construction, with a slate roof that is hipped to the main block. The octagonal block is two storeys, with a single storey wing projecting from the north elevation. | II |
| The Five Bells Public House; 52.12327°N 0.38906°W | | 17th century | 17th century public house, consisting of colour washed rough cast over a timber frame. A clay tile roof tops the two storeys, and there is multiple 19th and 20th century additions at the rear of the property. | II |
| 34a, Northill Road; 52.12140°N 0.38828°W | — | 17th century | The house was formerly known as Cople Cottage, and served as the gardener's cottage for Cople House. The cottage is timber framed, with a colour washed rough cast exterior and an old clay tile roof. A large extension was added in the mid-20th century, however this subsequently became a separate dwelling. | II |
| Mingalay; 52.11774°N 0.38840°W | — | 18th century | Single storey 18th century cottage, constructed from colour washed rough cast over a timber frame under a thatched roof. One red brick ridge stack, and a further on the north gable end. | II |
| 20 and 21, Water End; 52.11607°N 0.38745°W | — | 17th century | Number 20 consists of one storey and is formed from colour washed rough cast over a timber frame, less the east gable end which had brick facing. Whilst number 21, is a single storey 19th century brick extension at the rear. | II |
| Kennel's Cottage; 52.12488°N 0.38911°W | — | 17th century | Timber-framed house, with the exterior consisting of part colour washed rough cast and part pebbledash. The property consists of two separate dwellings, with number 16 forming a T-plan layout, and number 14 projecting from the south elevation. | II |
