= Listed buildings in Kempston Rural =

Kempston Rural is a civil parish in Bedford, Bedfordshire, England. It contains 27 listed buildings that are recorded in the National Heritage List for England. Of these, one is listed at Grade I, the highest of the three grades and the others are at Grade II, the lowest grade.

== Key ==
Grade	Criteria
I	Buildings of exceptional interest, sometimes considered to be internationally important
II*	Particularly important buildings of more than special interest
II	Buildings of national importance and special interest

== Buildings ==
Name and location	Photograph	Date	Notes	Grade
The Owl's Nest; 52.13100°N 0.52838°W		Late 18th to early 19th century	Timber-framed cottage, with a whitewashed brick facade. The southwest gable end is weatherboarded, and the rear is of colourwashed roughcast. Of one storey, it has a steeply pitched thatched roof.	II
Church of All Saints; 52.12094°N 0.51846°W		15th century	Much of the parish church is 15th century in origin, although there are remains of Norman work in the west tower and chancel. The nave wall has two painted panels depicting the Creation of Eve, the Temptation, Discovery and Expulsion.	I
1-4, Church End; 52.12047°N 0.51852°W		c1485	The row of houses are situated at the end of the parish churchyard, and have a red brick ground floor, with a timber-framed first floor now mainly rendered in colour-washed roughcast. A clay tile roof tops the two-storey properties.	II
42, Green End Road; 52.11733°N 0.52520°W	—	17th century	This one-storey house has been much altered externally, however still retains its basic original structure. It is of a timber frame construction, with colourwashed roughcast and a half-hipped old clay tile roof.	II
The Old Grooms Cottage; 52.11498°N 0.52806°W	—	18th century	Although the house is 18th century in origin, there is evidence of some earlier timber framework. The property is of two storeys of a red brick construction with a thatched roof. On the left-hand side there is a thatched roof lean-to, and on the right there is a red brick one-storey extension.	II
Kempston House; 52.11532°N 0.52896°W		Late 16th to early 17th century	The original wing of the house is two storeys in height, and is constructed of a close-studded timber frame with red brick nogging and a hipped old clay tile roof. To the rear of the house, there is an 18th-century additional wing of colourwashed brick, and a double-pitched roof. There is a further extension on the northeast elevation added in the 19th century, also made of brick with a hipped slate roof.	II
Tithe Farmhouse; 52.11261°N 0.53917°W	—	Late 17th to early 18th century	Brick house that is rendered with colour-washed roughcast. It is laid out in a H-plan with two storeys, and has a hipped old clay tile roof. There is a one-storey extension added onto the right-hand side.	II
Barn at the Clock House; 52.13063°N 0.53133°W	—	Late 17th to early 18th century	Red brick barn with some grey headers, and an old clay tile roof with tile gable coping. In the east elevation, there is a sunken clockface with an eaves band below, and there are three modern doorways within the north elevation.	II
Barn at Rushey Ford House; 52.12530°N 0.54027°W	—	18th century	The 18th-century barn is timber framed and weatherboarded, atop a coursed limestone rubble plinth. It has a corrugated iron roof.	II
Old Farmhouse; 52.11417°N 0.55645°W	—	17th century	Single-storey timber-framed house, with colour-washed plaster render and an old clay tile roof. There is a 19th-century rear wing of colourwashed brick and a tiled roof, and a further extension on the northeast elevation of rendered colour-washed brick and an old clay tile roof.	II
Wood End Farmhouse; 52.10914°N 0.53602°W	—	Late 17th to early 18th century	The farmhouse is arranged in a one-storey T-plan, with the rear wing being of a later period. The house is constructed from a timber frame with a colourwashed roughcast exterior, and an old clay tile roof. There is a brick built bread oven on the interior ground floor.	II
Box End House; 52.12608°N 0.52508°W	—	Late 16th century	Late 16th-century timber-framed house, which was originally laid out in a H-plan, before having the right-hand cross wing removed, to form a T-plan layout. The original main wing is of two storeys, and has an old clay tile roof. The surviving cross wing has an 18th-century addition to the left side, alongside an external stone chimney stack. There is a gabled tiled roof with addlestones and kneelers, topped with chimneys with pairs of octagonal shafts. Inside, there is an early 17th-century wall painting representing a bull-baiting scene, in one of the first floor rooms.	II
Orchardside; 52.13082°N 0.52855°W		17th century	Original house is of timber framing, with a 20th-century gabled wing added onto the right-hand side. The original block is one storey tall, with the exterior of colour-washed roughcast, and a thatched roof. The additional wing consists of two storeys of colour-washed brick, also with a thatched roof.	II
Groom's Cottage, Stables, Fodderstore and Carriage Shed at the Clock House; 52.13091°N 0.53145°W	—	Late 19th century	A range of farm outbuildings arranged around three sides of a square, abutting the northwest corner of Clock House. All constructed of local mottled red brick, with either slate or pantiled roofs. All of the buildings are one storey in height.	II
West End Farmhouse; 52.12382°N 0.54315°W		16th century	Timber-framed house that is rendered in colour-washed roughcast, with an old clay tile roof. The farmhouse is arranged in a T-plan with two storeys, the cross wing being on the left-hand side of the main block.	II
Meadow Farmhouse; 52.10359°N 0.57719°W	—	17th century	The exterior of the house consists of colour-washed roughcast, with a hipped old clay tile roof over the two storeys. The house was remodelled and extended in the late 18th to early 19th centuries.	II
Three Ways Cottage; 52.12483°N 0.54137°W		Late 18th century	Late 18th-century cottage of plastered timber frame on top of a stone rubble plinth, with the south gable end being of stone rubble also. Corrugated iron sheet roof covers the single-storey building. Inside, there is a main through passage, with a single room off either side.	II
Rushey Ford House; 52.12552°N 0.54042°W	—	Late 16 to early 17th century	Only a single bay and jettied crosswing remains of the original building, with later additions to the southeast and northwest elevations. Whilst the northwest wing is of red brick, the earlier portions are of timber fram construction. In the 19th century, the whole building was pebbledashed and colour-washed. An old clay tile roof tops the two-storey building.	II
Crossland Fosse; 52.13326°N 0.52645°W	—	1889	The two-storey house is constructed from red brick with a clay tile roof. There are projecting wings to either side of the main block with brick quoins. The east elevation, facing the garden, has an original conservatory with dentil eaves.	II
Lodge to Crossland Fosse; 52.13250°N 0.52892°W		1889	The lodge is laid out in a two-storey T-plan arrangement of red brick, with an old clay tile roof. There are two red brick ridge stacks with paired rectangular flues set at right angles.	II
The Old Vicarage; 52.12130°N 0.51925°W	—	Mid-19th century	The building was formerly the vicarage for the parish church, however is now in use as a private dwelling. The exterior is of stucco, with the rear wing being of whitewashed brick. A hipped Welsh slate roof tops the two storeys. There is a covered way, consisting of a leaded roof on slender wooden columns that leads towards the front door.	II
32, Green End Road; 52.11710°N 0.52421°W	—	Late 17th to early 18th century	One-storey timber-framed house, with a rendered and colour-washed roughcast exterior, and thatched roof.	II
56, Green End Road; 52.11707°N 0.52684°W	—	17th century	The original portion of the house is of a timber frame, and rendered with colour-washed cement. It is two storeys tall, with a half--hipped clay tile roof. There is a one-storey, flat-roofed extension to the right-hand side, of 20th-century origin.	II
Ramsay Cottage; 52.11453°N 0.53237°W	—	Late 17th to early 18th century	Timber-framed, single-storey cottage with colour-washed brick nogging. Each end of the building has been extended in colour-washed brick, and the ends of the thatched roof hipped. There is a further addition of a 20th-century thatched porch.	II
The Clock House; 52.13080°N 0.53074°W	—	1723	Red brick house with a double-pitched old clay tile roof over the two storeys. The ground floor was built out, and a heavy porch added in 1884. There is a single-storey, 19th-century extension to the east gable end.	II
Top Farmhouse; 52.12758°N 0.54063°W		18th century	18th-century farmhouse of two storeys, with a hipped old clay tile roof, and an exterior of colour-washed roughcast. There are two projecting rear wings with a double-pitched hipped roof.	II
Justin's Farmhouse; 52.11483°N 0.55493°W		17th century	Timber-framed farmhouse with red brick nogging, which has now been rendered over with pebbledash. Two'storey T-plan in layout, with an old clay tile roof. There is a 19th-century red brick and pantiled roof outbuilding on the right-hand side, and a single-storey lean-to on the left-hand side.	II
