= Listed buildings in Bromham, Bedfordshire =

Bromham is a civil parish in Bedford, Bedfordshire, England. It contains 27 listed buildings that are recorded in the National Heritage List for England. Of these, one is listed at Grade I, the highest of the three grades, one is listed at Grade II*, the middle grade and, the others are at Grade II, the lowest grade.

== Key ==
Grade	Criteria
I	Buildings of exceptional interest, sometimes considered to be internationally important
II*	Particularly important buildings of more than special interest
II	Buildings of national importance and special interest

== Buildings ==
Name and location	Photograph	Date	Notes	Grade
Parish Church of St Owen; 52.15033°N 0.52015°W		13th to 15th century	Church constructed between 13th and 15th centuries, with 19th and 20th century renovations. Coursed limestone rubble walls, with a tiled roof.	I
Coach House, Bromham Hall; 52.15023°N 0.51678°W	—	17th century	17th century coach house, now converted for residential use. Constructed from coursed limestone rubble. Old red clay tile roof over a two-storey L-plan.	II
Icehouse Bromham Hall; 52.14969°N 0.51741°W	—	18th century	18th century icehouse, of red brick and a thatched roof. The building is attached to the north-west corner of Heron Cottage. South-west end is partially buried.	II
Kerry House; 52.15165°N 0.52603°W	—	Mid-19th century	Mid 19th century estate-style house, of coursed limestone rubble. Old clay tile roof over two storey L-plan. Two yellow brick ridge chimney stacks.	II
Little Park House; 52.15366°N 0.50975°W	—	17th century	17th century farmhouse with modern extensions, constructed of coursed limestone rubble, with a thatched roof and stone stacks.	II
Molliver House; 52.15469°N 0.52204°W	—	17th and 18th centuries	17th and 18th century farmhouse with a later addition in the form of a 19th-century wing. Earlier section is constructed from coursed limestone rubble and an old clay tile roof; new wing constructed from part render, and part yellow brick, with a Welsh slate roof. Old part is two storey and attics, new wing is one storey and attics.	II
Bromham Mill; 52.14526°N 0.52450°W		18th to early 19th century	18th to early 19th century mill, that had been rebuilt on the site of an earlier mill. Largely constructed from red brick, however part of the base of both the north and south elevations has coursed limestone rubble; north and south elevations also has an amount of light timber-framing with brick infill exposed. Welsh slate roof over three storeys. Two storey extension, dated 1859, at the west gable end; consists of coursed limestone rubble with a slate roof.	II
The Old Smithy; 52.14503°N 0.52531°W		17th to early 18th century	17th to early 18th century cottage, converted from a former smithy. Consists of colour-washed plaster over a stone front wall, and a timber-framed rear wall. Thatched roof over one storey and attics. One storey extension at the east elevation, converted from a former forge.	II
45–49, Village Road; 52.14889°N 0.52770°W	—	16th to 17th century	16th or 17th century cottages with attached barn. Nos. 45–47 consists of a two-room cottage with a 19th-century one storey extension attached to the west elevation; constructed from coursed limestone rubble, and colourwashed plaster over timber frame; thatched roof over one storey and attics. No. 49 has similar material construction as Nos 45–47, less the east gable end is half-hipped with panelled pargetting.	II
38–40, Village Road; 52.14844°N 0.52767°W		17th to 18th century	17th or 18th century house, of colour-washed coursed limestone rubble, and part roughcast over a timber frame. Thatched roof over two storeys.	II
62–66, Village Road; 52.15036°N 0.52600°W	—	17th to 18th century	17th or 18th century pair of cottages, of colour washed coursed limestone rubble. Thatched roof over one storey and attics. 19th century gabled dormer with fretted bargeboards. Modern extensions to the rear of the building.	II
Bromham Hall; 52.14997°N 0.51524°W	—	Late Medieval period	House of late medieval origins, that has been enlarged in the early 17th century. Constructed from limestone rubble. Old clay tile roof over two storeys and attics. Two storey extension with a hipped roof, to the south of the front entrance.	II*
Brewery Cottages, Bromham Hall; 52.14987°N 0.51620°W	—	17th to 18th century	17th or 18th century cottages, converted in the 19th century from the former stables of Bromhall Hall (above). Constructed from limestone rubble. Old clay tile roof over a two-storey, long rectangular plan. 19th century timber framed extension, with brick infill, on the north elevation.	II
Rose Cottage; 52.15449°N 0.52146°W	—	18th century	18th century cottage, with 19th century alterations. Constructed from colour washed roughcast over a timber frame. Thatched roof, over one storey and attics. Modern single storey extension at the west elevation.	II
Barn at Bromham Mill; 52.14548°N 0.52475°W		17th to 18th century	17th or 18th century storage barn, consisting of a timber frame with weather boarding, on a stone plinth, and a Pantiled roof. Lean-to at the rear elevation.	II
1, Thistley Lane; 52.14326°N 0.53576°W		18th to 19th century	18th or 19th century cottage, that has been modernised in more recent years. Constructed of colour-washed plaster over stone. Thatched roof that is hipped at the north end, over one storey and attics. Possibly originally two cottages, now combined into one.	II
Bromham CVP School and Schoolhouse; 52.15006°N 0.52766°W		1861	Village school, dated 1861m with a school house attached. Constructed from coursed limestone, with a clay tile roof with a large diamond pattern formed by a single line of darker tile. The building itself, is in a T-plan, with the attached house turning it into a H-plan.	II
129, Village Road; 52.15325°N 0.52140°W	—	17th to 18th century	17th or 18th century cottage, originally of two rooms, but subsequently extended. Constructed of coursed limestone rubble, with a thatched roof that is hipped at both ends. It was extended west by one room in the 19th century, and east by two rooms in the 1940s, to make a final L-plan. The original internal timber framing is still largely intact.	II
West Lodge; 52.14923°N 0.52691°W	—	Early 19th century	Early 19th century lodge to Bromham Hall, of timber-frame construction, with colour-washed plaster over it. Thatched roof, less the north wing which has old clay tiles, covers one storey in a T-plan. Extension to the north, is not of any special interest in regards to the listing.	II
88-92, Village Road; 52.15186°N 0.52372°W	—	1859	Large house, dated 1859, that has now been divided into three separate dwellings. Constructed of coursed limestone rubble, and a clay tile roof with fishscale bands. Irregular H-plan layout, with two storeys. No. 88 has a 19th-century brick extension on the front elevation.	II
Berry Farmhouse; 52.14489°N 0.52802°W		late 17th to early 18th century	Late 17th to early 18th century farmhouse, constructed from coursed limestone rubble. Old clay tile roof, over two storeys and an attic in a rectangular plan. Two storey extension to the north elevation.	II
Orangery at Bromham Hall; 52.15137°N 0.51623°W	—	18th century	18th century orangery, set into a brick garden wall, consisting of a south-facing front of brick, and a hipped end old clay tile roof.	II
14, The Green; 52.15190°N 0.52630°W	—	17th century	17th century cottage, of colourwashed plaster over a timber frame. Thatched roof over one storey and attics. Colourwashed brick extension to the west elevation.	II
Kerry Thatch; 52.15182°N 0.52527°W	—	17th to 18th century	17th or 18th century cottage, consisting of a plastered timber frame, and a thatched roof over one storey and attics. Probably originally consisted of a two or three room cottage with central back-to-back hearth, it was later extended in the 18th or 19th century with one room added to each end.	II
School House Bromham Hall; 52.14980°N 0.51606°W	—	19th century	19th century school house, of a light timber frame with a red brick nogging set in decorative designs. Consisting of one storey and attics, the taller wing is thatched, and the lower has a clay tile roof.	II
110, Stagsden Road; 52.14326°N 0.53792°W		Early 19th century	Early 19th century tollhouse, that was originally built for the Bedford-Sherington turnpike. Now converted for residential use, it consists of coursed limestone rubble, with a new clay tile roof, in a one-storey L-plan.	II
109–113, Village Road; 52.15242°N 0.52371°W	—	Late 18th century	Late 18th century range of three cottages, consisting of roughcast over a timber-frame construction. Thatched roof with hipped ends over one storey and attics. No. 109 has a two-room plan, with a one sided chimney; No. 111 has a one-room plan sharing a double-sided chimney with No.113, which has a two-room plan.	II
