= Listed buildings in Odell, Bedfordshire =

Odell is a civil parish in Bedford, Bedfordshire, England. It contains 29 listed buildings that are recorded in the National Heritage List for England. Of these, one is listed at Grade I, the highest of the three grades, one is listed at Grade II*, the middle grade, and the others are at Grade II, the lowest grade.

== Key ==
Grade	Criteria
I	Buildings of exceptional interest, sometimes considered to be internationally important
II*	Particularly important buildings of more than special interest
II	Buildings of national importance and special interest

== Buildings ==
Name and location	Photograph	Date	Notes	Grade
Outhouse; 52.21214°N 0.58341°W	—	1603	Cottage of coursed limestone rubble with a thatched roof. The building is of a basic three-room, two storey layout, with an additional limestone and slate wing of 19th century origin forming an L-plan. The west gable end has a single storey, stone and pantiled roof outhouse.	II
Garden Wall at Odell Manor; 52.21263°N 0.58477°W	—	18th to 19th century	Coursed limestone rubble walls with tile tops, surrounding a rectangular garden area situated north of Odell Manor.	II
Barn at Village Farm; 52.20907°N 0.59112°W	—	17th century	17th century threshing barn situated immediately north of Village Farmhouse, of coursed limestone rubble with a pantiled roof and stone caped gable ends.	II
Odell Lodge; 52.21223°N 0.57795°W	—	Early 19th century	An early 19th century yellow brick lodge with a hipped Welsh slate roof and a pair of large brick chimney stacks. The building is of two storeys, with a later red brick wing added to the west, and a matching modern extension to the east.	II
Odell Estate Office; 52.21129°N 0.58650°W		Late 17th to early 18th century	The building started life as a barn, before being converted into the estate office for Odell, and finally into a private dwelling. It consists of two storeys of coursed limestone rubble and an old clay tile roof with stone coped gable ends.	II
75-79, High Street; 52.20928°N 0.58861°W		Late 17th to early 18th century	Range of two storey terraced cottages of coursed limestone rubble and thatched roofs.	II
89 and 91, High Street; 52.20896°N 0.58995°W	—	18th century	Pair of 18th century cottages, now converted into a single dwelling. The two storey building is constructed from coursed limestone rubble, and has a thatched roof with a stone coped west gable. There is an extension at the rear left hand side of stone, local chequered brick, and an old clay tile roof.	II
93, High Street; 52.20884°N 0.59011°W	—	1777	A coursed limestone rubble house with a colour washed exterior, some false ashlar scribing, and a Welsh slate roof. The house is arranged as a two storey L-plan, with the rear wing being on the east side.	II
121-125, High Street; 52.20838°N 0.59242°W	—	c1850	The row of terraced houses were formerly part of the Odell estate, and consist of two storeys of colour washed coursed limestone rubble underneath an old clay tile roof. To the west gable end, there is a single storey stone and corrugated iron roofed extension.	II
215, High Street; 52.20698°N 0.60177°W	—	18th century	18th century cottage of a thatched roof over coursed limestone rubble and some red brick dressings at the rear elevation.	II
13 and 15, Horsefair Lane; 52.20828°N 0.58939°W	—	Late 17th to early 18th century	Coursed limestone rubble cottage of two storeys, with a thatched roof.	II
50-52, Church Lane; 52.21522°N 0.58627°W		1705	A terrace of two storey cottages, constructed from coursed limestone rubble and thatched roofs with a stone coped south gable. There exists a single storey pantiled outhouse to the northern gable end, alongside a modern stone and tile roof extension at the south end.	II
Odell Manor; 52.21220°N 0.58447°W	—	17th or 18th century	A large country house of coursed limestone rubble and old clay tile roofs. The house has a complex plan whereby the main block is virtually a two storey H-plan with a longer side wing facing the driveway. There is a flat-roofed modern extension on the right hand side.	II
The Mad Dog Inn; 52.20711°N 0.60150°W	—	Late 17th to early 18th century	Former public house of a coursed limestone rubble construction, now in use as a private dwelling. It has a thatched roof that is hipped as the west end covering two storey L-plan. The rear wing is on the east side, with a pantiled roof extension projecting from the rear of this.	II
Castle Farmhouse; 52.21177°N 0.58312°W	—	Late 17th century	The farmhouse is constructed from coursed limestone rubble and has a modern tile roof with coped gable ends. It is arranged in a two storey T-plan layout, and has a single storey stone wall, pantiled roof outhouse attached to the east elevation.	II
Garage, Stables and Cottage at Odell Castle; 52.21109°N 0.58708°W	—	17th century	Former 17th century stable block at the entrance to Odell Castle, now converted into a one storey residence. Consists of coursed limestone rubble with an old clay tile roof hipped at the south end.	II
K6 Telephone Kiosk Adjacent to Number 97; 52.20877°N 0.59046°W	—	c1935	Type K6 telephone box, as designed by Sir Giles Gilbert Scott. Cast iron frame with square windows and a domed roof.	II
Hobbs Green Farmhouse; 52.21993°N 0.58529°W	—	17th century	Substantial two storey, 17th century farmhouse of coursed limestone rubble under a peg tile roof. There is a single storey modern extension, and modern brick cross-wing on the north side.	II
Parish Church of All Saints; 52.21182°N 0.58647°W		15th century	15th century parish church of a coursed limestone rubble construction, sited opposite Odell Castle. The tower is of four stages with clasping buttresses, a tracery frieze and pinnacles. Inside, there is a 15th century octagonal font, rood screen, and stained glass fragments; alonsgide 17th century pews and gallery.	I
198, High Street; 52.20737°N 0.59961°W	—	Late 17th to early 18th century	The house is of coursed limestone rubble, with the front and east elevations rendered to have imitation ashlar joints. A thatched roof tops the two storeys, and there is a lean-to with a clay tile roof to the right hand side. There is also a former barn at the rear right hand side, constructed of limestone with a clay tile roof.	II
The Thatched Cottage; 52.21593°N 0.58543°W	—	Late 17th to early 18th century	The single storey cottage has a thatched roof, hence the name, and is constructed of coursed limestone rubble.	II
Village Farmhouse; 52.20892°N 0.59101°W	—	17th century	A coursed limestone rubble farmhouse of two storeys with a thatched roof. The house has three brick and chimney stacks, and the interior retains substantial timber framing.	II
208, High Street; 52.20712°N 0.60108°W	—	Late 17th to early 18th century	The gable end of the house faces the road, and it is constructed of coursed limestone rubble and a thatched roof covering the single storey. Originally the building was of a two room plan, however a narrower wing was later added to the north end, with a further modern extension to this.	II
Entrance Gates, Gate Piers, Walls and Railings, Odell Castle; 52.21097°N 0.58720°W	—	18th and 19th century	The gates and walls are at the entrance to the inner courtyard of the castle. The gate piers are of limestone with urns on the top, and the gates of wrought iron. Either side of these are railings on top of dwarf walls.	II
The Bell Inn; 52.20915°N 0.58879°W		17th century	The inn is of 17th century origin, however has been extended and modernised in the time since. Its construction is of coursed limestone rubble, with a thatched roof over the two storeys. There are a number of modern extensions to the rear.	II
113-119, High Street; 52.20829°N 0.59175°W	—	Late 17th century	A former farmhouse and adjacent outhouses that have now been converted into a number of private dwellings. The main block is two storeys of coursed limestone rubble, with an old clay tile roof. There is an attached single storey cottage at the south gable end, of stone and thatch, arranged in an L-plan. To the south gable end of this, is a waterboarded and thatched outhouse.	II
207, High Street; 52.20691°N 0.60073°W	—	1606	A one storey, early 17th century cottage of coursed limestone rubble and a thatched roof, with two gable ends stacks: one of stone, and the other brick.	II
23, Horsefair Lane; 52.20778°N 0.58971°W	—	18th century	The cottage consists of one storey of coursed limestone rubble with some brick quoins, and a thatched roof.	II
Harrold Bridge; 52.19738°N 0.60346°W		Medieval	The date of construction for the bridge is unknown. The bridge is aligned north-south and spans over the River Great Ouse. Six arches span the river itself, followed by a further nine over the flood plain.	II*
