= Listed buildings in Clapham, Bedfordshire =

Clapham is a civil parish in Bedford, Bedfordshire, England. It contains 6 listed buildings that are recorded in the National Heritage List for England. Of these, one is listed at Grade I, the highest of the three grades, and the others are at Grade II, the lowest grade.

== Key ==
Grade	Criteria
I	Buildings of exceptional interest, sometimes considered to be internationally important
II*	Particularly important buildings of more than special interest
II	Buildings of national importance and special interest

== Buildings ==
Name and location	Photograph	Date	Notes	Grade
Clapham Park Farmhouse; 52.16438°N 0.48487°W		Late 16th to early 17th century	The dwelling is of a pebbledashed timber frame, with a stone gabled wing on the left side. The south gable end and ground floor of the west elevation have since been rebuilt in red brick, and is of an exposed nature. The whole structure is of two storeys with an old clay tile roof.	II
Park House; 52.16364°N 0.47121°W	—	1872	Large house built in 1872 for James Howard. It consists of two storeys, and is constructed from dark red brick. The east side contains a number of one storey ancillary service buildings. The interior remains virtually intact, including an oak staircase, oak floors, and carved oak doors.	II
Church of St Thomas of Canterbury; 52.16093°N 0.48979°W		Medieval	Parish church of Saxon origin, with Norman and more modern elements.	I
Horse and Groom Public House; 52.15975°N 0.49099°W		17th century	Two storey public house constructed from a timber frame with pebbledash render, under an old clay tile roof. There is a 20th-century gabled porch at the front, and a stone carriage arch on the right side.	II
Woodlands Lodge; 52.15751°N 0.48621°W		Early 19th century	Thatched roof, whitewashed roughcast lodge. Laid out in a one storey T-plan.	II
Lodge to Clapham Park; 52.16313°N 0.47570°W		1872	The lodge is the best preserved of thos to Clapham Park. It is constructed from dark red brick with stone dressings, and a hipped roof of fishscale clay tiles. The house is of a one storey T-plan.	II
