= Listed buildings in Felmersham =

Felmersham is a civil parish in Bedford, Bedfordshire, England. It contains 24 listed buildings that are recorded in the National Heritage List for England. Of these, one is listed at Grade I, the highest of the three grades and the others are at Grade II, the lowest grade.

== Key ==
Grade	Criteria
I	Buildings of exceptional interest, sometimes considered to be internationally important
II*	Particularly important buildings of more than special interest
II	Buildings of national importance and special interest

== Buildings ==
Name and location	Photograph	Date	Notes	Grade
Corn Close; 52.21013°N 0.54862°W	—	Late 18th century	A late 18th century house that was later altered in the 19th century, with the addition of a rear wing. The original structure consists of coursed limestone rubble, and a new tiled mansard roof; whilst the newer wing is of painted red brick and a slate roof.	II
College Farmhouse; 52.20985°N 0.54881°W		17th century	The 17th century farmhouse is of a coursed limestone rubble construction, with an old clay tile roof over the two storeys. There is an additional early 19th century wing at the rear of local red brick, also with an old clay tile roof.	II
Hall Farmhouse; 52.20480°N 0.53161°W	—	19th century	19th century farmhouse of coursed limestone rubble and a modern tile roof. The property is laid out in a two storey L-plan.	II
Sun Inn; 52.20799°N 0.55103°W		17th century	17th century two storey inn, constructed mainly of coursed limestone rubble with a thatched roof. A single storey former barn on the left hand side of the main block is now integrated into the pub.	II
The Old Bakery; 52.20785°N 0.55039°W	—	Late 17th to early 18th century	A former bakery, now converted into a private dwelling. The two storey building is of coursed limestone rubble with a new tile roof.	II
Old Rectory Cottage and 1 and 2 The Old Rectory; 52.20911°N 0.55014°W		17th century	The former vicarage is now a private dwelling, and is of coursed limestone rubble with an old clay tiled roof. The building is split into two wings, both of two storeys, with north wing being slightly smaller, and of earlier origin.	II
East Grange; 52.20945°N 0.55389°W	—	1886	Formerly conjoined with West Grange as a large mansion house. The house consists of two storeys, built with similar materials as West Grange.	II
The Cottage; 52.20588°N 0.55071°W	—	18th century	The cottage is of two storeys, and is constructed from colourwashed coursed limestone rubble, with 19th and 20th century brick extensions, and a clay tile roof.	II
The Cottage; 52.20644°N 0.53107°W	—	18th century	18th century cottage situated on the left hand end of a terrace. One storey of coursed limestone rubble with some plaster covering, under a thatched roof.	II
Wills Farmhouse; 52.20753°N 0.55372°W	—	17th century	The two storey farmhouse is of coursed limestone rubble construction, with a thatched roof.	II
Tithe Barn; 52.20974°N 0.54996°W		15th century	Large 15th century stone barn, situated south of the parish church. Constructed of coursed limestone rubble, with some shaped in blocks, and old clay tiles on a largely renewed roof. In the late 20th century, the building was renovated into several residential units.	II
Six Ringers House; 52.20824°N 0.55358°W		17th century	Former 17th century inn, converted into residential property. Of coursed limestone rubble with thatched roof and brick chimney stacks.	II
The Old Farmhouse; 52.20856°N 0.55415°W		17th century	Two storey farmhouse of coursed limestone rubble, modern brick coping to gables, and a modern clay tile roof.	II
The Stables; 52.11993°N 0.41691°W	—	17th century	Former stables to The Old Rectory, now converted into a house. The two storey structure is built from coursed limestone rubble, and an old clay tile roof with some fish scales.	II
West Grange; 52.20937°N 0.55422°W	—	1886	Formerly conjoined with East Grange as a large mansion house. Two storeys of coursed limestone rubble, and a modern concrete tile roof.	II
Manor House; 52.20997°N 0.54760°W	—	Early to mid-19th century	The large farmhouse consists of a front, road-facing block of 19th century origins, and a rear wing of 17th century origins. The front block consists of coursed limestone rubble that is roughly finished in order to give the appearance of ashlar, and a double-hipped Welsh slate roof. Whilst the rear wing is of coursed limestone rubble with an old clay tile roof.	II
Underwood Farm; 52.20803°N 0.52947°W	—	18th century	18th century farmhouse with one storey of colourwashed coursed limestone rubble, and a modern tile roof.	II
Cygnet Thatch; 52.20656°N 0.53184°W	—	17th century	Modernised 17th century house, of coursed limestone rubble and a thatched roof. Two storeys in nature.	II
Rose Cottage; 52.20641°N 0.53096°W	—	Late 17th to early 18th century	The two storey cottage consists of coursed limestone rubble and a 19th century additional storey of brick above it, with a slate roof on top.	II
Swan Cottage; 52.20636°N 0.53201°W	—	Late 17th to early 18th century	Formerly the Swan Inn, now a private dwelling, of coursed limestone rubble with a thatched roof. There is a small extension on the west elevation built of brick and stone.	II
Parish Church of St Mary; 52.20992°N 0.55048°W		13th century	Predominantly 13th century parish church, with 15th and 19th century alterations. Constructed from limestone rubble walling and ashlar dressings. The tower is of three stages, with the upper of the three added in the 15th century, together with an embattled parapet and south east turret.	I
Harrowdene Farmhouse; 52.20814°N 0.54808°W	—	17th century	The farmhouse is a two storey L-plan, of coursed limestone rubble, with some partly rendered, and an old clay tile roof.	II
White House; 52.20647°N 0.53068°W	—	1704	Dwelling constructed of colourwashed coursed limestone rubble under a Welsh slate roof. There is a single storey outhouse extension on the north elevation.	II
Greenway Cottage; 52.20639°N 0.53087°W	—	18th century	18th century, one storey cottage in coursed limestone rubble, with a thatched roof.	II
