= Listed buildings in Bletsoe =

Bletsoe is a civil parish in Bedford, Bedfordshire, England. It contains 23 listed buildings that are recorded in the National Heritage List for England. Of these, two are listed at Grade II*, the middle of the three grades, and the others are at Grade II, the lowest grade. The parish consists of large amounts of rural land, along with the village itself. Almost all the listed buildings are houses and associated structures, farmhouses, and farm buildings. Also listed are a church and a public house.

== Key ==
| Grade | Criteria |
|---|---|
| I | Buildings of exceptional interest, sometimes considered to be internationally important |
| II* | Particularly important buildings of more than special interest |
| II | Buildings of national importance and special interest |

== Buildings ==
| Name and location | Photograph | Date | Notes | Grade |
|---|---|---|---|---|
| 36, The Avenue; 52.21317°N 0.50523°W | — | 16th to 17th century | Cottage originates from the 16th or 17th century, with a modern extension to the rear. Made of colour washed plaster over a timber frame and a thatched roof. The building has two external gable end chimneys in colour washed limestone rubble. | II |
| 46–52, The Avenue; 52.21331°N 0.50488°W | | Early 19th century | Terrace of four early 19th century cottages made from local chequered brick with light headers and a Welsh slate roof. Each house has two storeys with two rooms on each storey. | II |
| The old school and school house 52.21336°N 0.50400°W | — | 1852 | Two storey school house of coursed limestone rubble with a gable end of fish scaletiles. Single story school room as the rear ring with a similar tiled roof that has been recently modernised. | II |
| Bletsoe Castle; 52.21439°N 0.50133°W | — | Late 16th century | Late 16th century mansion, that was reduced from three to two storeys in the 18th century and the subsequently modernised. The building is constructed from coursed limestone rubble and old clay tiles on a hipped roof. | II* |
| Pixie Cottage; 52.21196°N 0.50576°W | — | 17th century | Timber frames cottage with colour washed plaster infill and a limestone rubble chimney. Thatched roof on top of one storey and an attic. | II |
| The Falcon Inn; 52.20968°N 0.51150°W | — | 16th to 17th century | 16th to 17 century inn with modern extensions, Made from a timber frame, with colour washed plaster infilling and a new clay tile roof. There is a central double sided limestone chimney with grouped stack son roof. | II |
| North End farmhouse 52.22479°N 0.50060°W | — | 16th to 17th century | Farmhouse of 16th to 17th century origins, with 19th century alterations and extensive restoration through POW labour in the 1940s. Timber frame partly replace with local brick, also used as infill material. A thatched roof with two limestone rubble stacks. The building has one storey and an attic. It also contains Late 16th century stone fireplaces reputed to have come from Bletsoe Castle. | II |
| Gilbert's Cottage; 52.22396°N 0.50025°W | — | 16th to 17th century | Colour washed roughcast over timber frame, with a limestone plinth at the west end. A thatched roof covering two storeys and an attic. | II |
| 1, Oldway; 52.21272°N 0.50444°W | — | 18th century | 18th century cottage, modernised and extended in the 20th century. Coursed limestone rubble, with a small rendered frames section in the rear wall. Two gable end chimney stacks. | II |
| Bletsoe Park Farm; 52.23287°N 0.48702°W | — | 17th century | Isolated 17th century farmhouse, with 19th century additions and renovations. Coursed limestone rubble and some local brick in a chequer pattern with light headers. An old clay tile roof, covering two storeys and an attic. | II |
| 44, The Avenue; 52.21341°N 0.50504°W | — | 17th century | 17th century cottage, made from colour washed plaster over a timber frame, partly replaced by some stone and brick. A thatched roof, over one storey and an attic. | II |
| 54–62, The Avenue; 52.21364°N 0.50446°W | — | Late 18th century | Late 18th century terrace of six estate cottages. Made from colour washed plaster over light timber frame on a brick plinth. | II |
| Old Pear Tree Cottage; 52.21249°N 0.50477°W | — | 17th to 18th century | Constructed from colour washed plaster and exposed surviving timber frame. Thatched roof with one sided central chimney. | II |
| Church of St Mary the Virgin; 52.21369°N 0.50352°W | | 13th century | Medieval parish church, that was much restored in the 19th century. | II* |
| 1–6, Top Row; 52.21225°N 0.50496°W | — | 18th century | Terrace of six estate cottages, fully rendered light timber frame on a brick plinth, with a thatched roof. Each house has two storeys with two rooms on each storey. | II |
| Bridge over Bletsoe Castle moat 52.21413°N 0.50187°W | — | Late 16th century | Late 16th century bridge, laid over a partially filled moat at the probable original entrance to the mansion. | II |
| Bletsoe Cottage; 52.21078°N 0.50902°W | — | Late 17th to early 18th century | Late 17th to early 18th century cottage, altered in the 19th century, including the addition of a porch and an extension to the right. | II |
| North End farm cottages 52.22086°N 0.49952°W | — | 17th century | 17th century house modernised and extended in the 1940s. Made from a roughcast timber frame, and a pantile roof that replace an earlier thatch. | II |
| 2 and 3, Oldway; 52.21289°N 0.50414°W | — | c1500 | House originates from the 15th century, with later building periods up to the late 17th century and a small extension in the 19th century. Coursed limestone rubble partly replacing timber framing, timber frame with colourwashed plaster infill. The main building has an old clay tile roof, whereas the small extension is thatched. | II |
| 38 and 42, The Avenue; 52.21325°N 0.50503°W | — | 17th and 18th century | Cottage constructed from colour washed plaster over a timber frame and a thatched roof. | II |
| Old Rectory; 52.21484°N 0.50321°W | — | 1833 | Renovated and extended in 1875. Main house and rear wing limestone and brick with render partly removed from front elevation. Hipped roofs with Welsh slates. | II |
| Barn at Bletsoe Castle fram, adjacent to drive 52.21373°N 0.50159°W | — | 17th to 18th century | Limestone rubble walls and old clay tile roof. | II |
| 15 and 17, Memorial Lane; 52.21195°N 0.50547°W | — | 17th to 18th century | Terrace of cottages, modernised at a later date. Constructed from colour washed plaster over a timber frame, modern tile roof, and brick chimney stacks. | II |
