= Listed buildings in Carlton with Chellington =

Carlton with Chellington is a civil parish in Bedford, Bedfordshire, England. It contains 33 listed buildings that are recorded in the National Heritage List for England. Of these, two are listed at Grade I, the highest of the three grades, one is listed at Grade II*, the middle grade and, the others are at Grade II, the lowest grade.

== Key ==
Grade	Criteria
I	Buildings of exceptional interest, sometimes considered to be internationally important
II*	Particularly important buildings of more than special interest
II	Buildings of national importance and special interest

== Buildings ==
Name and location	Photograph	Date	Notes	Grade
Laburnham House; 52.19243°N 0.60141°W	—	Late 17th century	The house is arrange in an L-plan, and built from coursed limestone rubble, with 19th-century additions of colourwashed and rendered brickwork at the rear.	II
10, Bridgend; 52.19271°N 0.60210°W	—	Late 17th to early 18 century	Two-storey construction of coursed limestone rubble, with a steeply pitched welsh slate roof. There is both a central ridge chimeny stack, and another on the south gable end.	II
Diocesan Youth Centre, St Nicholas Church; 52.19666°N 0.59564°W		13th century	The earliest elements of the church are of 13th-century origin, with later additions present. It is constructed of coursed limestone rubble, with a 20th-century roof. The tower is from the 14th century, and is of three stages with clasping buttresses on the west side, topped with a broach spire with two tiers of lucarnes.	I
21 High Street; 52.18779°N 0.60648°W		Late 17th to early 18th century	The dwelling consists of a thatched roof over a one-storey colourwashed coursed limestone rubble construction. The gable end faces the road, brick chimney stack situated at each gable end. The east side has an attached barn of coursed limestone rubble, now used as part of the house.	II
Lye Cottage; 52.18732°N 0.60616°W		17th century	Two-storey house of 17th-century origin, constructed from coursed limestone rubble and a thatched roof. There is three red brick stacks- one each on the gable ends, and an off-centre stack on the ridge.	II
Homestead; 52.18690°N 0.60588°W		17th century	Two-storey house of coursed limestone rubble that has been rendered and colourwashed, all under a thatched roof. There is a 20th-century thatched porch addition on the east bay.	II
24, High Street; 52.18789°N 0.60706°W	—	Late 17th to early 18th century	Coursed limestone rubble house, with a steeply pitched welsh slate roof. House adjoins number 26 to the rear, and forms an L-plan with this property.	II
28, High Street; 52.18784°N 0.60683°W		18th century	Two-storey dwelling of coursed limestone rubble construction, under a thatched roof.	II
Rowan Cottage; 52.18742°N 0.60682°W	—	1740	Two storeys of coursed limestone rubble walls, under a steeply pitched roof of Welsh slate. There are chimney stacks on the two gable ends, and a one-storey lean-to addition on the east gable end.	II
Stayesmore Manor; 52.18637°N 0.60588°W	—	18th century	The house is of 18th-century construction, and was remodelled in the 19th century. The walls are of coursed limestone rubble with the remodelled east elevation being stuccoed. The roof is of old clay tiles. There is a adjoining outbuilding on the north elevation, of limestone rubble also with an old clay tile roof.	II
Marsh Farmhouse; 52.18844°N 0.61250°W	—	17th century	17th-century house of coursed limestone rubble construction, with a steeply pitched roof now of 20th-century concrete tiles. The eastern bay has a large double ridge stack, serving interior back-to-back fireplaces.	II
Parish Church of Saint Mary; 52.18371°N 0.60933°W		14th century	The parish church is largely of 14th and 15th century in origin, with remains of Anglo-Saxon work in parts. It is constructed of coursed limestone rubble with clay tile roofs. The tower is of three stages, with an embattled parapet and gargoyles at each corner. In regards to the interior, the pews and pulpit are largely Jacobean.	I
8, Bridgend; 52.19305°N 0.60237°W	—	Late 17th century	The house is set out in an L-plan of two storeys, constructed from coursed limestone rubble and an old clay tile roof. There is a red brick stack on the north gable end, along with an off-centre ridge stack.	II
The Angel Public House; 52.18798°N 0.60665°W		17th century	Now a dwelling, it is 17th century in origin, with 18th- and 19th-century alterations and additions. The original two-storey portion is of colourwashed limestone rubble, and a Welsh slate roof with a central ridge chimney stack. The south elevation has a T-plan extension also of colourwashed limestone rubble and an old clay tile roof.	II
Stonehaven; 52.18879°N 0.61003°W	—	17th century	Coursed limestone rubble dwelling, under a 20th-century concrete tile roof. There is a small one-storey lean-to extension on the right side that is rendered with a Welsh slate roof.	II
7, The Moor; 52.19263°N 0.60329°W	—	17th century	One-storey house of coursed limestone rubble, with a thatched roof and a central ridge chimney stack. There are 19th-century colourwashed brick extensions added at right-angles to the northeast gable end.	II
Moorfield; 52.19107°N 0.60631°W	—	17th century	The dwelling is of colourwashed limestone rubble, under a thatched roof with tile gable coping. There is a 20th-century gabled porch at the northeast elevation.	II
Braehead; 52.18687°N 0.58148°W	—	Mid-19th century	The house consists of a hipped Welsh slate roof, over two storeys of coursed limestone rubble. There is a large 20th-century extension to the southeast side.	II
25, The Moor; 52.19200°N 0.60442°W	—	17th century	17th-century house with 18th-century alterations and extension. The original block is of one storey with a thatched roof, and has a coursed limestone rubble ground floor, and a timber framed first floor. The 18th century wing projects from the right side, and is of colourwashed coursed limestone rubble, with a thatched roof.	II
Carlton Post Office and Village Stores; 52.19255°N 0.60200°W		1624	Originally two dwellings, the buildings have been joined to create a single house and a shop. The north house dates to 1624, whilst the south building dates to 1807. Consisting of two storeys, it is built from colourwashed limestone rubble, with an old clay tile roof to the north, and concrete tile roof to the south.	II
Baptist Meeting House; 52.18726°N 0.60542°W	—	1760	Chapel consisting of coursed limestone rubble under a hipped old clay tile roof. The north elevation has a two-storey 19th century-extension of coursed limestone rubble, with a Welsh slate roof.	II
The Den; 52.19313°N 0.60172°W	—	18th century	The two-storey house adjoins number 1, Bridgend. It consists of coursed limestone rubble walls under a concrete tile roof.	II
Harrold Bridge; 52.19738°N 0.60346°W		Medieval	The date of construction for the bridge is unknown. The bridge is aligned north-south and spans over the River Great Ouse. Six arches span the river itself, followed by a further nine over the flood plain.	II*
Chellington House; 52.19328°N 0.60183°W		17th century	The 17th century-house was remodelled in the 19th century, and consists of two storeys of coursed limestone rubble under a 20th-century concrete tile roof.	II
Crossways; 52.19221°N 0.60143°W	—	18th century	The walls are of coursed limestone rubble pebbledash rendered, with a Welsh slate roof over. The main structure is two storeys, with a single-storey extension to the right side.	II
Monument to Sir Robert Darling, 1 1/2 Metres from South East Corner of Chancel, St Nicholas Church; 52.19659°N 0.59548°W	—	c1770	Chest tomb, consisting of a moulded base, with a cover that was originally surmounted with a stone urn and flame (these have since been removed).	II
25, High Street; 52.18767°N 0.60647°W	—	Late 18th to early 19th century	The dwelling consists of colourwashed coursed limestone rubble walls, under a Welsh slate roof. Two storeys tall, there is an additional lean-to at the north gable end.	II
2, High Street; 52.18923°N 0.60809°W	—	17th century	Two storeys of coursed limestone rubble, with a thatched roof. Chimney stacks on south gable end are rendered and colourwashed.	II
26, High Street; 52.18796°N 0.60693°W		Late 17th to early 18th century	Two-storey dwelling, consisting of coursed limestone rubble walls topped with an old clay tile roof.	II
Twildo; 52.18763°N 0.60679°W		17th century	The 17th-century dwelling is an L-plan of one storey, and consists of coursed limestone rubble under a thatched roof. There is a 20th-century extension on the west elevation.	II
Faulkner's Farmhouse; 52.18897°N 0.60868°W	—	Late 17th to early 18th century	The house is of an L-plan, and was altered and heightened in the 20th century. It consists of coursed limestone rubble, and was heightened in red brick. The whole building is two storeys under a Welsh slate roof.	II
21, Pavenham Road; 52.19138°N 0.59979°W		18th century	Two-storey dwelling of coursed limestone rubble with an old clay tile roof.	II
Fishers Farm Barn; 52.18322°N 0.59713°W	—	17th century	17th century barn constructed of coursed squared stone under a corrugated iron roof. There is a number of later extensions to the barn.	II
