= Listed buildings in Little Staughton =

Little Staughton is a civil parish in Bedford, Bedfordshire, England. It contains 11 listed buildings that are recorded in the National Heritage List for England. Of these, one is listed at Grade I, the highest of the three grades and the others are at Grade II, the lowest grade.

== Key ==
Grade	Criteria
I	Buildings of exceptional interest, sometimes considered to be internationally important
II*	Particularly important buildings of more than special interest
II	Buildings of national importance and special interest

== Buildings ==
Name and location	Photograph	Date	Notes	Grade
Church of All Saints; 52.25397°N 0.37919°W		15th century	15th century parish church with some 13th and 14th details extant, it is of coursed limestone rubble and brown cobbles with ashlar dressings. The west tower is of four stages, and has an embattled parapet with a 19th-century octagonal spire rising out of the top. Inside, there is a 15th-century plain octagonal font, and some 16th century pews.	I
Old White House Farmhouse; 52.24712°N 0.37947°W		c1700	Constructed from colour washed roughcast over a timber frame, and a half hipped thatch roof covers the single storey. There is a one-storey 20th century extension to the south gable end.	II
Green End Cottage; 52.25593°N 0.38678°W	—	17th century	17th century cottage of colour washed roughcast over a timber frame, and a thatched roof. The main building is one storey, with a further one storey addition to the south gable end.	II
The Cottage; 52.25037°N 0.38893°W		17th century	A single storey timber-framed cottage with a colour washed roughcast exterior, and a half-hipped thatched roof. A lean-to addition is present at the east gable end.	II
The Old Manse; 52.24151°N 0.37717°W	—	17th century	17th century house, with the two northern bays constructed from colour washed plaster over a timber frame, and a later south bay of colour washed brick. An old clay tile roof tops the single storey, with a lower single storey extension to the north gable end.	II
Hill Farmhouse; 52.25287°N 0.38437°W	—	c1600	Timber framed farmhouse with colour washed roughcast, and an old clay tile roof. The house is laid out in a two-storey T-plan arrangement, and the cross-wing has a single storey colour washed brick extension to the west elevation.	II
Corner Cottage Greenbanks; 52.25321°N 0.38326°W	—	17th century	The cottage is of colour washed roughcast over a timber frame, and a 20th-century tile roof. It consists of two storeys with a further two storey extension to the west gable end, and a single storey lean-to on the east gable end.	II
The Old Rectory; 52.24898°N 0.38144°W	—	17th century	Formerly a rectory for the parish church, the building is now a private dwelling. Of a two-storey T-plan layout, the building consists of a brick ground floor and a roughcast first floor, all colour washed. An old clay tile roof tops the building, and some of the timber framing is exposed on the west elevation.	II
Tudor Rose Cottage; 52.25650°N 0.38572°W	—	c1700	Cottage of 17th century origins with later additions. Of a timber-frame construction on the south two bays and brick on the north bay, all covered with a colour washed roughcast exterior. Laid out in a one-storey L-plan, with an old clay tile roof.	II
Manor Farmhouse; 52.25238°N 0.38270°W	—	c1600	The farmhouse is of red brick casing to a timber frame, with render over the south elevation. An old clay tile roof tops the single storey T-plan building.	II
Green End House; 52.25582°N 0.38595°W	—	17th century	The rear block is of 17th century origin and consists of two storeys of colour washed roughcast over a timber frame, with an old clay tile roof. The front, road-facing, block is from the 19th century and is constructed from colour washed brick with a hipped slate roof. There is an additional conservatory on the south gable end.	II
