= Listed buildings in Biddenham =

Biddenham is a civil parish in Bedford, Bedfordshire, England. It contains 23 listed buildings that are recorded in the National Heritage List for England. Of these, one is listed at Grade I, the highest of the three grades, and the others are at Grade II, the lowest grade. The entire parish consists of a large village, containing small, thatched cottages at the southern end, and large detached, modern houses in the northern end. Almost all the listed buildings are houses and associated structures, farmhouses, and farm buildings. Also listed are a church and a public house.

== Key ==
Grade	Criteria
I	Buildings of exceptional interest, sometimes considered to be internationally important
II*	Particularly important buildings of more than special interest
II	Buildings of national importance and special interest

== Buildings ==
Name and location	Photograph	Date	Notes	Grade
55, Church End; 52.13788°N 0.51923°W		Late 17th to early 18th century	The two-story, timber frame cottage, originates from the late 17th to early 18th century. An external, brick chimney stack was added sometime in the 18th century, and another, earlier, chimney in the left hand gable end above the one story extension. The front of the building consists of three first floor casement windows, two ground floor casements and a plain central doorway.	II
Barns at church farm, 20 metres east of church farmhouse 52.13802°N 0.50225°W		17th to 18th century	The barns originate from the 17th to 18th centuries and constructed out of coursed limestone rubble. The entrance barn, has weather boarding over the carriageway entrance and an old clay tile roof, whereas the barn to the south, has a slightly lower pantile roof. The west elevation has a set of stairs leading to the first floor entrance.	II
39 and 41, Church End; 52.13783°N 0.51799°W		Late 17th to early 18th century	The cottages originate from the late 17th to early 18th century and are constructed out of colour washed plaster over a timber frame. Number 39, consists of one, three-room, storey with an attic and fronts onto Church Lane. Number 41 consists of one two-room storey.	II
3, Gold Lane, Biddenham; 52.13877°N 0.51274°W		17th Century	The cottages originate from the 17th century and is constructed out of coursed limestone rubble, with part colour washed plaster. The building has a thatched roof, one three-room story and an attic. There is a chimney stack located in the centre of the house and one on the gable end.	II
20–28, Main Road; 52.13843°N 0.50655°W		Mid 18th Century	The row of timber framed, rough cast cottages, originate from the mid-18th century, and have thatched a roof with red brick chimney stacks at the ridge. All of the cottages consist of one story and an attic.	II
11, Main Road; 52.13717°N 0.50326°W	—	c1907	The Tudor-style house was built in c1907, from white roughcast with timber framing and a red tile roof. The building has two stories.	II
37–41, Main Road; 52.13809°N 0.50651°W		17th to 18th century	The row of cottages are built from colour washed plaster over part limestone rubble, part timber frame, and have a thatched roof.	II
The Old Vicarage; 52.13837°N 0.51150°W	—	18th century	Former vicarage, originating in the 18th century, re-fenestrated in the 19th century. The building is two storeys made of limestone rubble with a hipped slated roof. To the left is a 19th-century limestone building with slate roof also.	II
66, Bromham Road; 52.14355°N 0.51038°W	—	1869	A house in cottage orne style, with a gable end stone dated 1869. Consisting of a timber-frame construction with a patterned red brick infill, and a large, steep sloped roof with bands of fish-scale clay tiles. Rectangular plan consisting of two storeys.	II
Parish Church of St James; 52.13844°N 0.51967°W		various, 13th to 17th century	Chancel and aisleless of Norman origins, rebuilt in the 14th century, with a porch added in the 15th century. North aisle added in the 16th century and west tower from the 13th century. Built from coursed limestone rubble with ashlar dressings and clay tile roofs.	I
Manor Farmhouse; 52.13836°N 0.51400°W		19th century	Large 19th-century farmhouse incorporating parts of earlier buildings. Constructed from coursed limestone rubble and has an old clay tile roof.	II
Grove Farmhouse; 52.13838°N 0.50580°W	—	18th century	Two 18th-century houses abutting each other, with 19th-century alterations, including an extension to the rear.	II
48 and 50, Main Road; 52.13897°N 0.51071°W		17th to 18th century	Building built in the 17th or 18th century, and renovated in the 19th century. Built from Colour washed plaster over rubble, and has a thatched roof. Four room plan arranged in two cottages, with one storey and an attic.	II
49–53, Main Road; 52.13829°N 0.50792°W		17th to 18th century	Building built in the 17th or 18th century from limestone rubble. Number 49 has a thatched roof, whilst number 51 has a modern tile roof. There is a brick extension on the road end.	II
Walnut Cottage; 52.13681°N 0.51430°W	—	18th to 19th century	Two units, western building constructed from colour washed plaster over a timber frame. It has a thatched roof, one storey, modern casements and a porch. Eastern building made from colour washed brick and a clay tile roof.	II
19, Main Road; 52.13781°N 0.50472°W		17th century	17th century cottage with modern extensions. Constructed from colour washed plaster over limestone and a thatched roof. Original part of the building has one storey and an attic, and the modern portion has two storeys.	II
35, Main Road; 52.13801°N 0.50633°W	—	18th century	18th century cottage made from colour washed plaster over a timber frame, a thatched roof, and a limestone chimney on the south side.	II
Three Tuns Public House; 52.13832°N 0.50842°W		17th to 18th century	Public house of 17th to 18th century origins that has been modernised and extended. Made from coursed limestone rubble, and a thatched roof. 19th century extension to west made from brick and tile.	II
The White Cottage; 52.13728°N 0.51519°W	—	c1910	Simplified, Tudor-style house built in c1910. White rough-cast, with tile roof and brick chimneys.	II
23, Main Road; 52.13806°N 0.50549°W		18th century	18th century cottage, constructed from colour washed and scribed plaster over limestone rubble and a thatched roof. Small stone and slate roofed extension to the west.	II
55, Main Road; 52.13819°N 0.50812°W	—	18th century	18th century cottage, constructed from colour washed over limestone rubble and a thatched roof.	II
Three Gables; 52.13953°N 0.49714°W		1900	House built in 1900, made from local red brick of varying hues, under a roof of red clay plain tiles. Two storeys with steeply pitched roofs and varied elevations. The garden, roughly three-quarters of an acre, is listed at Grade II in the Register of Historic Parks and Gardens of Special Historic Interest in England.	II
White Cottage; 52.14059°N 0.50133°W		1908	House built in 1908, from bricks covered in roughcast render, a roof covering of red clay tiles, and red brick chimney stacks. The house faces north-west and has an approximately rectangular plan. A late 20th-century single-storey kitchen extension is on the north-east end.	II
