= Listed buildings in Little Barford =

Little Barford is a civil parish in Bedford, Bedfordshire, England. It contains 10 listed buildings that are recorded in the National Heritage List for England. Of these, none are listed at Grade I, the highest of the three grades, one is listed at Grade II*, the middle grade and, the others are at Grade II, the lowest grade.

== Key ==
| Grade | Criteria |
|---|---|
| I | Buildings of exceptional interest, sometimes considered to be internationally important |
| II* | Particularly important buildings of more than special interest |
| II | Buildings of national importance and special interest |

== Buildings ==
| Name and location | Photograph | Date | Notes | Grade |
|---|---|---|---|---|
| Timber-framed Barn at Lower Farm; 52.19888°N 0.27364°W | | 17th century | 17th century barn of timber framing on a brick and concrete plinth, with a weatherboarded exterior. A corrugated iron sheet roof now replaces the original thatch, and there is a mid-20th-century building adjoining the south gable end. Much of the original framing remains in the interior, with some having been replaced with 20th-century machine-sawn timber. | II |
| Lower Farmhouse; 52.19818°N 0.27382°W | — | 17th century | The farmhouse is of an irregular two storey plan, with an earlier block to the northeast and a 19th-century additional block to the southwest. It is built from red brick with an old clay tile roof, and there is a single storey outhouse projecting from the east gable end of the older block. | II |
| 1-4 The Bungalows; 52.19737°N 0.27433°W | | 18th century | A row of 18th-century cottages, consisting of roughcast over a timber frame, with brick casing to the south gable end, underneath a half hipped thatched roof. They are all one storey in nature, and number one is detached from the other three dwellings. There are various single storey 20th century additions to the rear. | II |
| Parish Church of Saint Denys; 52.19824°N 0.27856°W | | Medieval | The parish church is of Norman origin, with 14th-, 15th-, and 19th-century additions and alterations. It is constructed of brown cobbles with ashlar dressings, with a mix of 20th-century tile, and slate roofs. The tower was built in the 15th century and has three stages with an embattled parapet. Inside, there is a 13th-century octagonal font and 19th-century roofs and pews. | II* |
| Little Barford School; 52.19872°N 0.27268°W | — | 1872 | Formerly a school, the building now lays vacant; it is constructed from gault brick with red sandstone dressings and a clay tile roof. The building consists of a one storey L-plan layout, of a rectangular plan schoolroom with an additional porch to the north elevation. | II |
| The Manor House and Outbuildings, Game Larder and Ha-Ha, Little Barford; 52.19706°N 0.27601°W | | Early 19th century | The manor is probably of late 18th century in origin, however it was extensively remodelled in circa 1870, and served as a rectory until just before this time. The main house consists of two storeys of mainly gault brick with stone dressings, and a roof of plain tiles covering; there is some red brick, and some Welsh slate present however. The game larder is situated a few metres east of the kitchen and pantry, it is a small single storey rectangular structure of ventilated timber walls, gault brick laid in Flemish bond. and a hipped Welsh slate roof. The ha-ha is of part uncoursed rubble sandstone and ironstone, part gault brick laid in monk bond construction and runs from the church path at the northwest of the house, arcing around to the former carriage drive in the southeast | II |
| The Coach House and Stables at Little Barford; 52.19754°N 0.27532°W | — | c1870 | A combined coach house and stables, with groom's accommodation situated above, laid out in a two storey U-plan around a central yard.. They are of gault brick with red brick details, and a pitched roof of plain tiles. Inside, the four original horse stalls and doors are retained. | II |
| The Motor House at Little Barford; 52.19783°N 0.27494°W | — | 1910–1924 | The building served at a motor house for the manor, with space intended for washing, inspecting, and maintaining cars. It is of gault brick laid in monk bond, with an oak forecourt and roof covered in corrugated metal sheets. | II |
| Little Barford War Memorial; 52.19821°N 0.27818°W | — | 1920s | The memorial was constructed to commemorate the seven men from the village who died in World War One, and is sited in the northeast corner of the parish churchyard. It consists of cross fleury with a central roundel and raised decorative bands on both faces. This is mounted on top of a short tapering shaft rising from a two-tier square plinth. | II |
| Cross Socket Base in the Churchyard of St Denys, Little Barford; 52.19826°N 0.27810°W | — | Medieval | An octagonal, roughly dressed limestone base of a former medieval standing cross that is found in the northeast corner of the parish churchyard. | II |
