= Listed buildings in Great Barford =

Great Barford is a civil parish in Bedford, Bedfordshire, England. It contains 37 listed buildings that are recorded in the National Heritage List for England. Of these, one is listed at Grade I, the highest of the three grades, one is listed at Grade II*, the middle grade and, the others are at Grade II, the lowest grade.

== Key ==
Grade	Criteria
I	Buildings of exceptional interest, sometimes considered to be internationally important
II*	Particularly important buildings of more than special interest
II	Buildings of national importance and special interest

== Buildings ==
Name and location	Photograph	Date	Notes	Grade
Birchfield Farmhouse; 52.17223°N 0.36047°W		17th century	Farmhouse laid out in a two-storey L-plan, consisting of colour washed rough cast over a timber frame, and an old clay tile roof. There are additional single storey lean-tos on the west and rear elevations.	II
29, Green End Road; 52.15909°N 0.35568°W		c1700	The cottage is of a timber-frame construction, with colour washed rough cast over. A thatched roof tops the one storey building, and a 20th-century, single storey, flat-roofed extension projects from the west elevation.	II
27, High Street; 52.15696°N 0.34916°W	—	Early 17th century	Early 17th century house of colour washed rough cast over a timber frame, and an old clay tile roof. The main structure is two storeys, and there is a lean-to addition on the northwest elevation.	II
Rose Cottage; 52.15567°N 0.34734°W	—	17th century	The single storey, thatched roof cottage, is of colour washed rough cast over a timber frame. There is a lean-to addition to the rear of the building.	II
61, High Street; 52.15384°N 0.34675°W	—	17th century	The house is laid out in a two-storey L-plan, and is constructed of colour washed rough cast over a timber frame, which was part refaced or rebuilt in chequered brick in the 19th century, and an old clay tile roof.	II
The Anchor Public House; 52.15164°N 0.34378°W		c1700	Public house consisting of two blocks, with the earlier originating circa 1700, and the later in the 19th century. The original block is two storeys, colour washed rough cast over a timber frame with a clay tile roof; whilst the newer wing is also two storeys of colour washed brick with a hipped slate roof.	II
8, New Road; 52.15202°N 0.34283°W	—	18th century	18th century, timber-framed cottage of part colour washed brick infill, part colour washed plaster infill, and part colour washed roughcast. The cottage consists of a thatched roof over one storey. There is a single storey red brick and thatched roof addition at the rear.	II
8 and 10, Roxton Road; 52.15909°N 0.35125°W	—	17th century	17th century pair of cottages, with 18th and 19th century alterations. Consists of brick and colour washed rough cast over a timber frame, with a thatched roof. There are multiple one storey additions to the rear of the properties.	II
Game Larder at Barford House; 52.16657°N 0.33812°W	—	Mid to late 19th century	One storey, octagonal game larder constructed from wood cladding, with a thatched roof.	II
The Gardens; 52.15516°N 0.34977°W	—	17th century	2 storey cottage, of colour washed rough cast over timber frame, with a thatched roof.	II
Barford Bridge and Causeway; 52.15101°N 0.34322°W		15th century	The bridge crosses the River Great Ouse, and is constructed from coursed rubble, some dark sandstone, and some limestone. It consists of 17 arches, and spans approximately 140 metres. The upper part of the bridge was widened and rebuilt in brick in 1874.	I
Old Mills Cottage; 52.14565°N 0.35204°W	—	1845	The former lock keeper's cottage, now a private dwelling, is constructed from mottled yellow brick with red brick quoins and opening surrounds, with some ashlar dressings, and a clay tile roof. The building is laid out in a two-storey T-plan, with a single storey lean-to addition.	II
Brook House; 52.15762°N 0.34671°W	—	Mid-19th century	19th century house of yellow gault brick with colour washed stuccoed front, and a slate roof. Laid out in a two-storey L-plan, with the single storeyed flat roofed block to the south.	II
Greenlands; 52.16100°N 0.35912°W	—	18th century	2 storey, L-plan house, of colour washed rough cast with an old clay tile roof.	II
65, Green End Road; 52.15964°N 0.36111°W	—	17th century	17th century farmhouse of colour washed rough cast over a timber frame, and an old clay tile roof. One storey construction, with further 20th century blocks projecting from the rear.	II
Green End Farmhouse; 52.16021°N 0.36299°W		17th century	The farmhouse is of colour washed brick and some rough cast over a timber frame, with a clay tile roof, laid out in a two-storey T-plan. There are various one storey additions to the side and rear elevations.	II
Saville Cottage; 52.15595°N 0.34759°W	—	17th century	Timber-framed cottage, with some rough cast, some incised plaster, all colour washed. An old clay tile roof over the T-plan layout, with the road-facing block two storeys, and the rear wing one storey. There is a 20th-century single storey extension to the rear wing.	II
Pound Farmhouse; 52.15496°N 0.34672°W	—	17th century	17th century farmhouse, of colour washed rough cast over a timber frame. Thatched roof over the two storey structure, with the left hand side of the roof hipped.	II
College Farmhouse; 52.15427°N 0.34685°W	—	17th century	Farmhouse consisting of two wings from the 17th and 18th centuries. The earlier wing is of colour washed rough cast over a timber frame, with an old clay tile roof; whilst the newer, road-facing wing is red brick, also with an old clay tile roof. The front block is three storeys, and the rear two.	II
Parish Church of All Saints; 52.15200°N 0.34397°W		19th century	The parish church is mainly of 19th-century origin; however, it retains some 15th-century elements, including the tower. Constructed of coursed limestone rubble with ashlar dressings. The tower is of five stages, topped with an embattled parapet, with a small lead covered octagonal spire.	II*
Bridge House; 52.15116°N 0.34482°W	—	c1600	Farmhouse of colour washed rough cast over a timber frame, with an old clay tile roof. Two storey L-plan in layout, with a later one storey, colour washed brick addition to the north elevation.	II
Bridge Cottage; 52.15158°N 0.34331°W		18th century	18th century cottage, constructed of colour washed rough cast over a timber frame, topped with an old clay tile roof. Single storey main structure, with a further single-storey, 20th-century addition to the northwest elevation.	II
Lowlands; 52.16462°N 0.33739°W		Early 19th century	Early 19th century yellow brick house, with the front elevation colour washed, and a slate roof. There is a decorative dummy archway to the rear elevation, alongside two round-headed rusticated red and yellow brick archways, at the rear and front.	II
Barford House; 52.16640°N 0.33835°W	—	1843	Yellow brick small country house, with stone dressings, and a hipped slate roof. The house is two storeys and dominated by a four-storey square tower.	II
Barn North of Barford House; 52.16673°N 0.33823°W	—	Mid to late 19th century	The barn is constructed of wood cladding, and has a thatched roof.	II
52 and 54, Silver Street; 52.15674°N 0.35286°W	—	18th century	Pair of 18th-century cottages, of colour washed brick and rough cast, with a thatched roof. Each cottage is of a one-room, one storey layout. There are two-storeyed, 20th-century extensions on both gable ends, alongside number 54 having a further extension projecting forward.	II
The Creakers Farmhouse; 52.16474°N 0.38474°W	—	17th century	17th century farmhouse of colour washed rough cast over a timber frame, with some colour washed brick casing, and a clay tile roof over. The property is laid out with two storeys in an L-plan, and has various red brick chimney stacks.	II
20, High Street; 52.15747°N 0.35121°W	—	17th century	Although the original part of the property is 17th century in origin, the front, road-facing block is a 19th-century addition. The original structure is constructed of colour washed rough cast over a timber frame, whilst the newer is of colour washed brick, all under an old clay tile roof. The building is arranged in an L-plan, with the front block of a single storey, and the rear wing of two storeys.	II
Dorchester; 52.15805°N 0.35363°W	—	17th century	The thatched roof cottage mostly consists of colour washed rough cast over a timber frame, however the south gable end is of colour washed brick. The main structure is one storey, with a single storey lean-to, and flat roofed extensions to the rear.	II
106, Green End Road; 52.16027°N 0.36170°W	—	18th century	The house is of colour washed rough cast, apparently over brick, and has an old clay tile roof. Two storeys in nature, there is a further 19th century two storeyed block to the rear, and various other single storey, red brick additions.	II
The Old Crown; 52.15787°N 0.35233°W		17th century	Former public house, now a private dwelling. A one-storey T-plan, it is of colour washed rough cast over a timber frame, with an old clay tile roof. There are multiple later additions to the rear and east gable end.	II
The Old Vicarage; 52.15455°N 0.34662°W	—	Early 18th century	Now a private dwelling, the building previously served as the vicarage for the parish church. Of colour washed render over brick, there are fragments of a substantial timber frame visible at the rear. The building is two storeys, and the interior retains the painted wood panelling to the hallway and fielded panel shutters to the windows. There are two 19th-century single-storey additions at the rear.	II
The White Hart Public House; 52.15237°N 0.34454441°W	—	16th century	Once a public house, the building is now a private dwelling. The two-storey building is of 16th-century origin, and is constructed of colour washed rough cast over a timber frame, underneath an old clay tile roof. Laid out in a T-plan, there are numerous 20th century, one storey additions on the north and east elevations.	II
Granary at Bridge House; 52.15130°N 0.34464°W	—	18th century	Small, rectangular, timber framed granary, with colour washed brick infill, and an old clay tile hipped roof.	II
Gate Piers and Gate to Barford House; 52.16441°N 0.33820°W	—	Mid to late 19th century	A pair of square, ashalr piers, approximately 6 feet tall. These flank a wood and wrought iron gate, of a pierced arcading design with wrought ironwork. These mark the entry to Barford House.	II
Screen Wall Adjoining Barford House to North; 52.16648°N 0.33825°W	—	Unknown	The screen wall links Barford House to associated outbuildings to the north. It is of a yellow brick construction, with five projecting brick piers topped with a variety of stone urns. There is a cambered arched gateway with a vermiculated stone keystone.	II
Lantern Cottage; 52.15649°N 0.35308°W	—	17th century	17th century cottage of colour washed rough cast over a timber frame, with a thatched roof. One storey, with a further single storey extension to the east gable end.	II
