= Oscar =

Oscar, OSCAR, or The Oscar may refer to:

== People and fictional and mythical characters ==
- Oscar (given name), including lists of people and fictional characters named Oscar, Óscar or Oskar
- Oscar (footballer, born 1954), Brazilian footballer José Oscar Bernardi
- Oscar (footballer, born 1991), Brazilian footballer Oscar dos Santos Emboaba Júnior
- Oscar (Irish mythology), son of Oisín and grandson of Finn mac Cumhall
- Oscar (wrestling), manager of Men on a Mission

== Places in the United States ==
- Oscar, Kentucky, an unincorporated community
- Oscar, Louisiana, an unincorporated community
- Oscar, Missouri, an unincorporated community
- Oscar, Oklahoma, an unincorporated community
- Oscar, Pennsylvania, an unincorporated community
- Oscar, Texas, an unincorporated community
- Oscar Township, Otter Tail County, Minnesota, a civil township
- Lake Oscar (disambiguation)

== Animals ==
- Oscar (bull) (died 1983) a ProRodeo Hall of Fame bucking bull
- Oscar (bionic cat), a cat that had implants after losing both hind paws
- Oscar (therapy cat), a cat purported to predict the deaths of hospice patients
- Oscar (fish), Astronotus ocellatus
- Beast of Busco, a North American cryptid turtle, nicknamed "Oscar"
- Unsinkable Sam, a World War II ship's cat that survived three ships sinking, nicknamed "Oscar"

== Arts and entertainment ==
=== Film ===
- Oscar, another name for an Academy Award
- The Oscar (film), starring Stephen Boyd
- Oscar (1967 film), starring Louis de Funès
- Oscar (1991 film), starring Sylvester Stallone

=== Other uses in arts and entertainment ===
- Oscar (opera), 2013, about Oscar Wilde, by Theodore Morrison
- Oscar (video game), a 1993 platform game
- Oscar (TV serial), a 1985 British TV serial
- "Oscar" (Juliet Bravo), a 1980 television episode
- OSC OSCar, a music synthesizer manufactured by the Oxford Synthesizer Company
- Oscar (ballet), choreographed by Christopher Wheeldon

== Military ==
- Oscar, the letter O in the ICAO spelling alphabet (NATO phonetic alphabet)
- Nakajima Ki-43 Hayabusa, a World War II Japanese fighter aircraft (Allied codename "Oscar")
- Oscar-class submarine, a Soviet/Russian Navy submarine class
- Oscar (paradummy), American nickname for decoys dropped during the 1944 invasion of Normandy
- OSCAR (Optimum Survival Containment and Recovery), an escape pod project for the Vought F-8 Crusader fighter aircraft

== Science and technology ==
- OSCAR McMaster, an electronic medical record system
- OSCAR protocol, a protocol used by AOL Instant Messenger
- Open Source Cluster Application Resources, a Linux-based software installation
- OSCAR (gene), short for Osteoclast-associated immunoglobulin-like receptor
- Ocean Surface Current Analysis – Real time, a website that provides data on ocean currents
- OSCAR (Orbital Satellite Carrying Amateur Radio), a designation for amateur radio satellites

== Transport ==
- OScar, a project aiming to design an open source vehicle
- OScar (Danish automobile), a Danish sports car
- MSC Oscar, container ship
- Oscar, a a whaling ship sunk off Aberdeen in 1813
- Outer Suburban CAR, a name for the NSW TrainLink H set, a type of electric train in Australia

== Other uses ==
- List of storms named Oscar, storms bearing this name
- Oscar Health, a U.S. health insurance company
- Out of School Care and Recreation
- OSCAR Radio, a school FM radio station in Northamptonshire, England

== See also ==
- Student Oscars (Student Academy Awards), the Student Film Awards
- King Oscar (disambiguation)
- Veal Oscar, a culinary creation
- Oskar (disambiguation)
- Office of the Scottish Charity Regulator (OSCR)
