= Oscar (given name) =

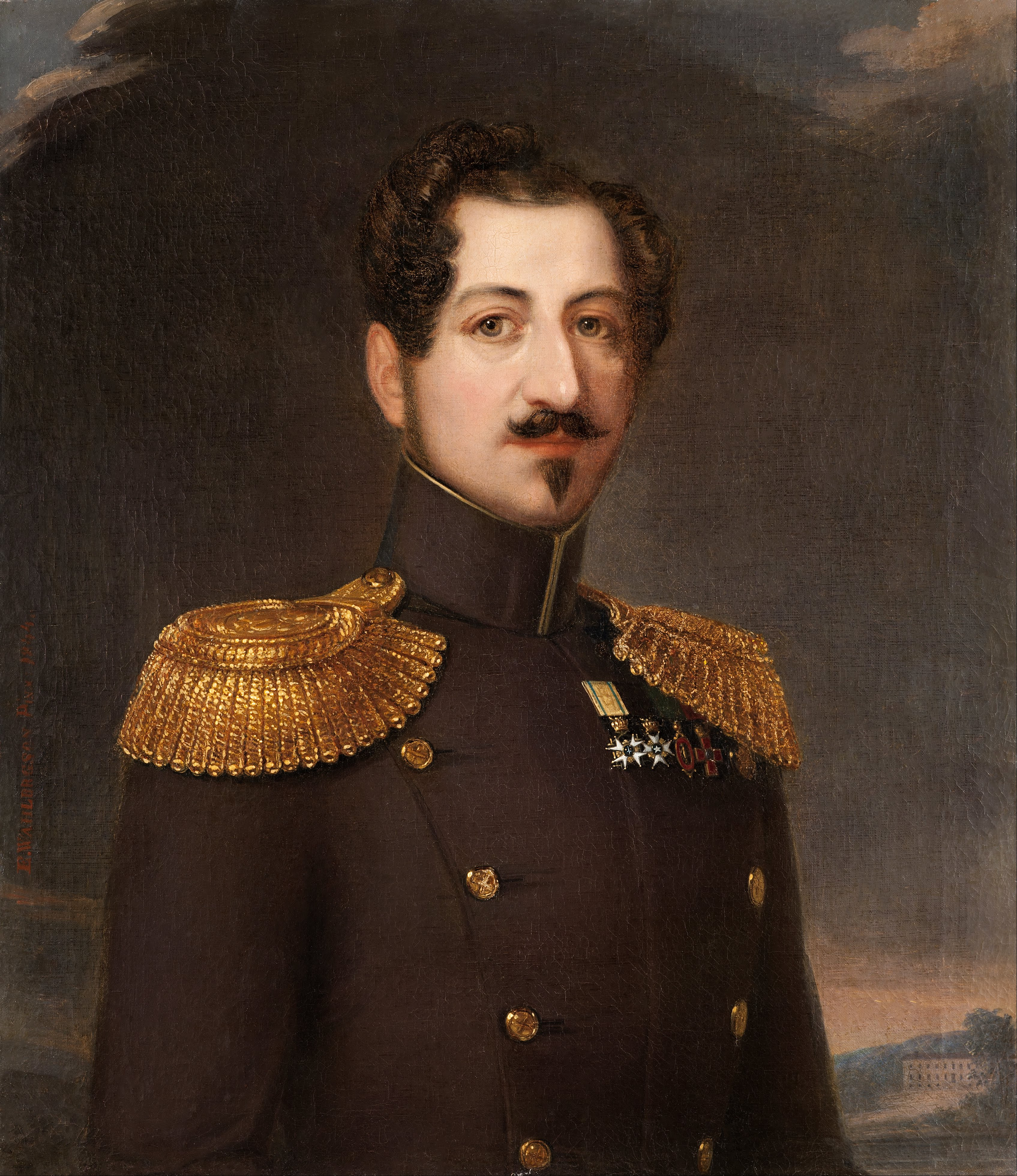
- Oscar I of Sweden
- Pronunciation: English: /ˈɒskər/; Spanish: [ˈoskaɾ]; Portuguese: [ˈɔʃkɐɾ]; Italian: [ˈɔskar]; German: [ˈɔskaʁ]; Swedish: [ˈɔ̂sːkar]
- Gender: Masculine
- Language: Old English, Irish

Origin
- Language: Old English Old Norse
- Derivation: os + thiri or os + gar
- Meaning: "god's spear" / “Spear of the gods” or “Friend of Deer”

Other names
- Alternative spelling: Oskar

Oscar or Oskar is a masculine given name of English, Old Norse and Irish origin.

== Etymology ==
The name Oscar has some roots in Old English and Old Norse cultures which may be linked to the Norse Viking settlement of England. The Old English variation is derived from the elements "os" meaning "god" and "gar" meaning "spear," meaning “Gods Spear” thus combining into a powerful image of divine strength. Similarly, in Old Norse, which was a mutually intelligible language to Old English, Oscar is believed to translate to "spear of the gods," again reiterating a sense of noble valor. Oscar was a popular name in England until the 1066 Norman Conquest following which some Norse and Germanic names began to become less common and gradually replaced by names such as William or Henry which were more popular among the Normans.

The earlier Irish equivalent has an all-together different meaning to its Anglo-Norse counterparts. In Irish, the first, element os, means "deer"; the second element, car, means "loving" or "friend", thus "deer-loving one" or "friend of deer". The name is borne by a character in Irish mythology—Oscar, grandson of Fionn Mac Cumhaill, and refers to his descent from his grandmother, Sadhbh, who was enchanted into the form of a deer.

The name was popularised in the 18th century by Scottish poet James Macpherson, creator of 'Ossianic poetry'. Today the name is associated with Scandinavia because Napoleon was an admirer of Macpherson's work and gave the name to his godson, Joseph Bernadotte, who later became Oscar I, King of Sweden. Consequently, at the time many Swedes were named Oscar. The name was given to more than a half-dozen members of Scandinavian royal houses. Oscar was the third most popular name for males born in Sweden in 2013 and is ranked 51 in terms of the most popular male names in Sweden.

There is alternative speculation that it may be derived from the Old Norse cognate Ásgeirr (a personal name itself composed of the elements meaning "god" and "spear").

== Cognates ==
- Austrian German, Croatian, Czech, Estonian, Finnish, German, Norwegian, Polish, Scandinavian, Slovenian, Swedish, Swiss German: Oskar
- Icelandic: Óskar
- Catalan: Òscar.
- Danish, Dutch, English, French, Irish, Italian, Norwegian, Portuguese, Romanian, Swedish: Oscar
  - Spanish, Portuguese (mostly European): Óscar
- Finnish: Oskari, Okko, Osku (a pet form of Oskari)
- Hungarian: Oszkár
- Kazakh: Askar, Asqar, Oskar
- Latin: Anscharius
- Latvian: Oskars
- Lithuanian: Oskaras
- Scottish Gaelic: Osgar
- Gaeilge: Osgar/Osgur

== People with the given name Oscar ==
- Oscar I of Sweden (1799–1859), King of Sweden and Norway
- Oscar II of Sweden (1829–1907), King of Sweden and Norway
- Óscar Acevedo (born 1997), Nicaraguan footballer
- Oscar Acosta (disambiguation), several people
- Oscar Aguad (born 1950), Argentine politician
- Oscar Ahumada (born 1982), Argentine footballer
- Oscar Ahnfelt (1813–1882), Swedish singer, composer and music publisher
- Oscar Albayalde (born 1963), Filipino police officer
- Oscar Allen (footballer) (born 1999), Australian rules footballer
- Oscar Dana Allen (1836–1913), American professor of chemistry
- Oscar K. Allen (1882–1936), American politician, 42nd governor of Louisiana
- Oscar Almgren (1869–1945), Swedish archaeologist
- Oscar Ameringer (1870–1943), German-American editor, author, and organizer
- Oscar Andriani (1905–1987), Italian actor and playwright
- Oscar Asche (1871–1936), Australian actor, director, and writer
- Oscar Aubuchon (1917–1970), Canadian ice hockey player
- Oscar Anthony Barbarin, American clinical psychologist and academic
- Oscar Baumann (1864–1899), Austrian explorer, cartographer and ethnographer
- Oscar Beregi (actor, born 1876) (1876–1965), Hungarian-American actor, father of the actor below
- Oscar Beregi (actor, born 1918) (1918–1976), Hungarian-American actor
- Prince Oscar Bernadotte (1859–1953), Swedish prince and admiral
- Oscar Bettison (born 1975), British/American composer
- Oscar Bianchi (born 1975), Italian-Swiss composer
- Oscar Bobb (born 2003), Norwegian professional footballer
- Oscar Bonavena (1942–1976), Argentine boxer
- Oscar Brand (1920–2016), Canadian-born folk singer-songwriter, radio and TV host
- Oscar Brodney (1907–2008), American lawyer and screenwriter
- Oscar Bronner (born 1943), Austrian journalist and painter
- Oscar Brown (disambiguation), several people
- Oscar Burnham (born 1999), French para-alpine skier
- Oscar Camenzind (born 1971), professional road racing cyclist from Switzerland
- Oscar Cantú (born 1966), Mexican-American Catholic prelate
- Oscar Cesare (1883–1948), Swedish-American caricaturist, painter, and cartoonist
- Oscar Charleston (1896–1954), American baseball player
- Oscar Chapman (American football) (born 1999), Australian American football player
- Oscar Cluff (born 2001), Australian basketball player
- Oscar Coggins (born 1999), Hong Kong triathlon athlete
- Oscar Colás (born 1998), Cuban baseball player
- Oscar Collazo (1914–1994), Puerto Rican militant
- Oscar Cortínez (born 1973), Argentine marathon runner
- Oscar Dansk (born 1994), Swedish ice hockey player
- Oscar Danielson (disambiguation), multiple people
- Oscar dos Santos Emboaba Júnior, aka Oscar (footballer, born 1991), Brazilian footballer
- Oscar Delp (born 2003), American football player
- Oscar Drouin (1890–1953), Canadian politician
- Oscar Dunn (1822–1871), American politician
- Oskar Ewerlöf (1876–1934), Swedish diplomat
- Oscar Fantenberg (born 1991), Swedish professional ice hockey player
- Oscar Feltsman (1921–2013), Soviet-Ukrainian composer
- Oscar Fernandes (1941–2021), Indian politician
- Oscar Lorenzo Fernández (1897–1948), Brazilian composer
- Oscar Filho (born 1978), Brazilian TV presenter, reporter, actor, comedian, writer and businessperson
- Oscar Foronda (born 1970), Spanish actor
- Oscar Bardi de Fourtou (1836–1897), French politician
- Oscar Fristrom (1856–1918), Australian portrait painter and art teacher
- Oscar Gamble (1949–2018), American baseball player
- Oscar Gardner (1872–1928), American bantamweight and featherweight boxer
- Oscar González (baseball) (born 1998), Dominican baseball player
- Oscar Grant (1986–2009), African American fatally shot by police
- Oscar Gugen (1910–1992), co-founded the British Sub-Aqua Club, and the partnership E. T. Skinner & Co. Ltd., which became Typhoon International
- Oscar Hammerstein I (1846–1919), German-American businessman and theatre impresario
- Oscar Hammerstein II (1895–1960), American songwriter and musical director
- Oscar Hedvall (born 1998), Danish footballer
- Oscar Han (1891–1976), Romanian sculptor and writer
- Oscar Hijuelos (1951–2013), Cuban-American novelist
- Oscar Højlund (born 2005), Danish footballer
- Oscar Holmes (1916–2001), first African-American Naval Aviator and air traffic controller
- Oscar Horta (born 1974), Spanish animal activist, moral philosopher, and professor
- Oscar De La Hoya (born 1973), American boxer and boxing promoter
- Oskar Hultman (1862–1929), Finnish linguist
- Oscar Isaac (born 1979), American actor
- Oscar Jacobson (1882–1966), Swedish-born American painter and museum curator
- Oscar James (born 1942), Trinidadian actor
- Oscar Kahl (born 1997), Thai football player
- Oscar Krokstedt (1908–1985), Swedish Navy vice admiral
- Oscar Krusnell (born 1999), Swedish footballer
- Oscar Levant (1906–1972), American pianist, composer, author, comedian, and actor
- Oscar Lloyd (born 1997), British actor
- Oscar Raymond Luhring (1879–1944), American lawyer, jurist, politician, and justice
- Oscar Machapa (born 1987), Zimbabwean professional association footballer
- Oscar Malapitan (born 1955), Filipino politician
- Oscar Malbernat (1944–2019), Argentine footballer, and captain of Estudiantes de La Plata
- Oscar Massin (1829–1913), Belgian-born French jeweler known as "the Diamond Reformer"
- Oscar Mathafa, South African politician
- Oscar F. Mayer (1859–1955), American processed-meat magnate
- Oscar Micheaux (1884–1951), American author, film director and independent producer
- Oscar McDonald (born 1996), Australian rules footballer for Fremantle, Melbourne, and Carlton
- Oscar McInerney (born 1994), Australian rules footballer for Brisbane
- Oscar Niemeyer (1907–2012), Brazilian architect
- Oscar Nilsson (equestrian) (1896–1974), Swedish vaulter who competed in the 1920 Summer Olympics
- Oscar Nissen (1843–1911), Norwegian physician, newspaper editor and politician
- Oscar Osterman (1894–1956), Swedish Army officer
- Oscar Otte (born 1993), German professional tennis player
- Oscar Peterson (1925–2007), Canadian jazz pianist and composer
- Oscar Pettiford (1922–1960), American jazz double bassist and composer
- Oscar Piastri (born 2001), Australian racing driver
- Oscar Pistorius (born 1986), South African sprinter and convicted murderer
- Oscar Raise (born 1952), Italian high jumper
- Oscar Randal-Williams (born 1984), British mathematician
- Oscar van Rappard (1896–1962), Dutch footballer and hurdler
- Oscar de la Renta (1932–2014), Dominican-American fashion designer
- Oscar Robertson (born 1938), American basketball player
- Oscar Ruggeri (born 1962), Argentine professional footballer
- Oscar Luigi Scalfaro (1918–2012), Italian politician
- Ossie Schectman (1919–2013), American basketball player who scored the first basket in National Basketball Association history
- Oscar Schmidt (1958–2026), Brazilian basketball player
- Oscar Schmidt Jr. (1896–1973), United States Navy sailor and Medal of Honor recipient
- Oscar J. Smith (1859–1937), American lawyer and politician
- Oscar Steene (born 2003), Australian rules footballer for Collingwood
- Oscar Strasnoy (born 1970), French-Argentine composer
- Oscar Strático (born 1956), Argentine judoka and wrestler
- Oscar Traynor (1886–1963), Irish politician
- Oscar Tshiebwe (born 1999), Congolese basketball player
- Oscar Tuero (1898–1960), Cuban baseball player
- Oscar Underwood (1862–1929), American lawyer and politician
- Oscar Wendt (born 1985), Swedish football player
- Oscar Wilde (1854–1900), Irish writer and poet
- Oscar Lawton Wilkerson (1926–2023), American pilot
- Oscar Wisting (1871–1936), Norwegian Naval officer and polar explorer
- Oscar Zariski (1899–1986), Russian-born American mathematician

== People with the given name Óscar ==
- Óscar Marcelino Álvarez (1948–2016), Argentine football player
- Óscar Álvarez (cyclist) (born 1977), Colombian cyclist
- Óscar Álvarez (footballer) (born 1977), Spanish football player
- Óscar Alzaga (born 1942), Spanish jurist, academic and politician
- Óscar Elías Biscet (born 1961), Cuban physician and activist
- Óscar Chinchilla (born 1969), Guatemalan politician
- Óscar David Álvarez (born 1983), Colombian golfer
- Óscar de Marcos (born 1989), Spanish footballer
- Óscar Fernández (fencer) (born 1962), Spanish fencer
- Óscar Fernández (athlete) (born 1974), Spanish runner
- Óscar Fernández (football manager) (born 1974), Spanish football coach
- Óscar Fernández (judoka) (born 1978), Spanish judoka
- Óscar Freire (born 1976), Spanish cyclist
- Óscar Gutiérrez (born 1974), American professional wrestler better known as Rey Mysterio
- Óscar Núñez (born 1958), American actor and comedian
- Óscar Pereiro (born 1977), Spanish cyclist
- Óscar Romero (1917–1980), saint and Salvadoran Archbishop
- Óscar Sevilla (born 1976), Spanish cyclist
- Óscar Téllez (born 1975), Spanish football player
- Óscar Valdez (born 1990), Mexican professional boxer
- Óscar Vargas (cyclist) (born 1964), Colombian cyclist
- Óscar Vargas (footballer) (born 1980), Honduran footballer
- Óscar Vega (boxer) (born 1965), Spanish boxer
- Óscar Vega (footballer) (born 1987), Spanish footballer
- Óscar Villarreal (baseball) (born 1981), Mexican baseball player
- Óscar Villarreal (baseball) (born 1981), Mexican pitcher in Major League Baseball
- Óscar Villarreal (footballer) (born 1981), Colombian footballer
- Óscar Espinosa Villarreal, Mayor of Mexico City from 1994 to 1997

== People with the given name Oskar ==
- Prince Oskar of Prussia (1888–1958), German Prince (Prince of Prussia)
- Oskar Alexander (1876–1953), Croatian painter
- Oskar Anderson (1887–1960), German-Russian mathematician
- Oskar Andersson (1877–1906), Swedish cartoonist
- Oskar Angelus (1892–1979), Estonian politician
- Oskar Backlund (1846–1916), Swedish-Russian astronomer
- Oskar Baum (1883–1941), Czech music educator and writer
- Oskar Deutsch (born 1963), Austrian entrepreneur and President of the Jewish Community of Vienna
- Oskar Dirlewanger (1895–1945), German military officer and war criminal of Nazi Germany
- Oskar Dvořák (born 1991), Slovak politician
- Oskar Edlund (born 2002), Swedish hurdler
- Oskar Enkvist (1849–1912), Russian admiral
- Oskar Fischer (disambiguation), multiple people
- Oskar Freysinger (born 1960), Swiss politician
- Oskar Gröning (1921–2018), German SS Unterscharführer at the Auschwitz concentration camp
- Oskar Heil (1908–1994), German electrical engineer and inventor
- Oskar Hoffmann (author) (1866–1928), German science-fiction writer
- Oskar Hoffmann (painter) (1851–1912), Baltic-German painter from Estonia
- Oskar Hoffmann (politician) (1877–1953), German editor and politician
- Oskar Homolka (1898–1978), Austrian film and theatre actor
- Oskar von Hutier (1857–1934), German military commander
- Óskar Jónasson, Icelandic film director and screenwriter
- Oskar Kallas (1868–1946), Estonian diplomat, linguist and folklorist
- Oskar Kallis (1892–1918), Estonian painter
- Oskar Kaplur (1889–1962), Estonian wrestler
- Oskar Kirmes (born 1995), Finnish artistic gymnast
- Oskar Klein (1894–1977), Swedish physicist
- Oskar Kokoschka (1886–1980), Austrian-British-Swiss artist, poet and playwright
- Oskar Kolberg (1814–1890), Polish ethnographer, folklorist and composer
- Oskar Lafontaine (born 1943), German politician
- Oskar Löfkvist (born 1980), Swedish actor
- Oskar Loorits (1900–1961), Estonian folklorist
- Oskar Luts (1887–1953), Estonian writer
- Oskar Matute (born 1972), Basque politician
- Oskar Merikanto (1868–1924), Finnish musician and composer
- Oskar Morgenstern (1902–1977), Austrian-American economist
- Oskar Nedbal (1874–1930), Czech violist, composer and conductor
- Oskar Nilsson (disambiguation), several people
- Oskar Osala (born 1987), Finnish ice hockey player
- Oskar Painter, Canadian physicist
- Oskar Pfungst (1874–1932), German biologist and psychologist
- Oskar Potiorek (1853–1933), Austro-Hungarian general and Governor of Bosnia and Herzegovina
- Oskar Roehler (born 1959), German film director
- Oskar Schindler (1908–1974), German industrialist, spy and humanitarian
- Oskar Schlemmer (1888–1943), German painter, sculptor, designer and choreographer
- Oskar Schmidt (ice hockey) (1908–1974), Swiss ice hockey player
- Oskar Seuntjens (born 1998), Belgian politician
- Panda Eyes (born 1996), Oskar Steinbeck, Swiss DJ and music producer
- Oskar Vogt (1870–1959), German physician and neurologist

== Fictional characters ==
- Oscar the Grouch, a Muppet on Sesame Street
- Oscar Bluth, on the television series Arrested Development
- Oscar Branning, on the soap opera EastEnders
- Oscar François de Jarjayes, a female protagonist on the anime series The Rose of Versailles
- Oskar Greason, a character from the animated series Star vs. the Forces of Evil
- Oscar Madison, the sloppy roommate in The Odd Couple media franchise
- Oscar Martinez (The Office), in the American television series The Office
- Oscar Osborne, on the soap opera Hollyoaks
- Oscar Shales, a character on the television series Prison Break

== See also ==
- List of Irish-language given names
- Oskarsson, which also includes Oscarsson and Óskarsson
