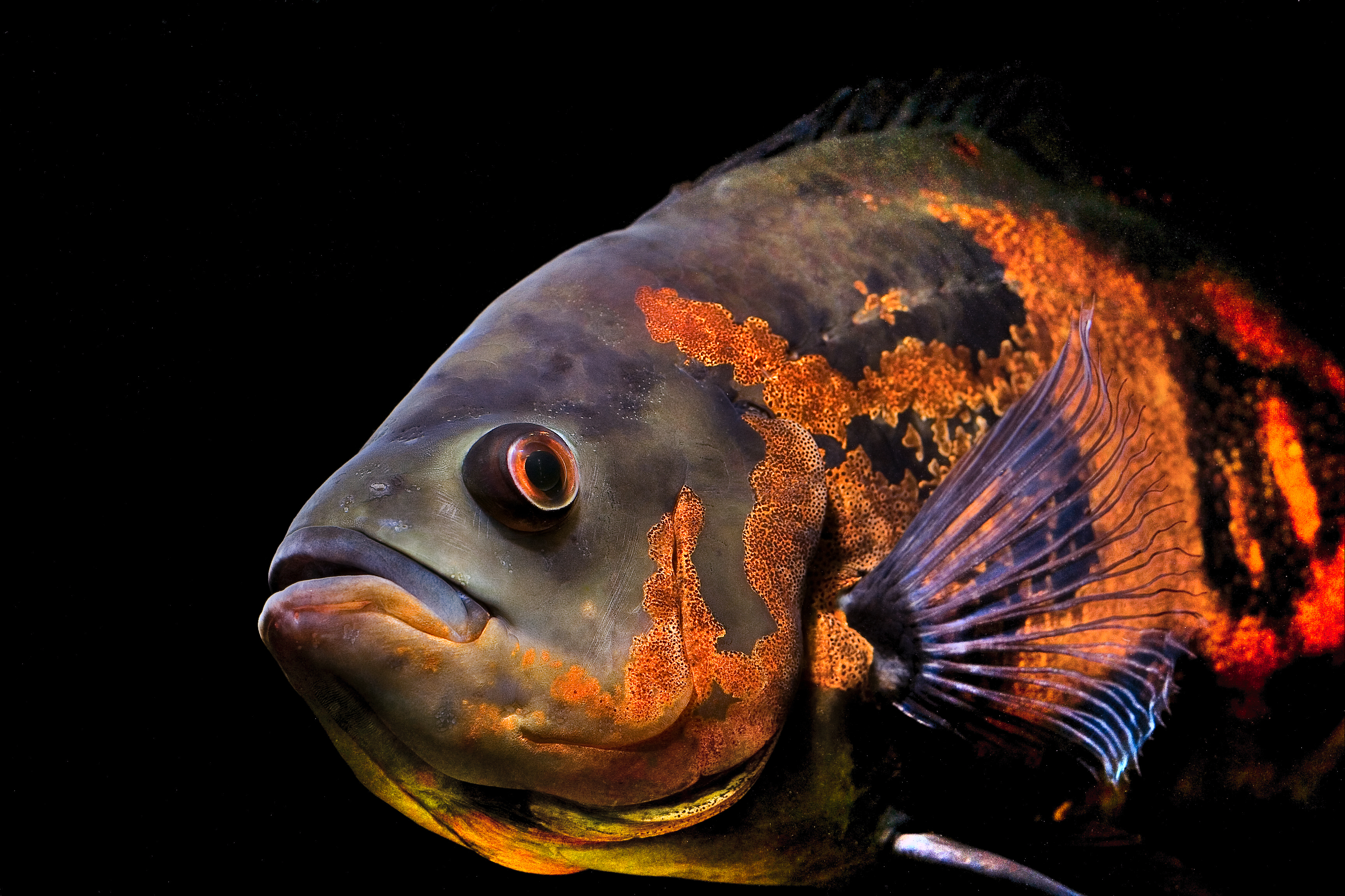
- The oscar is certainly the best-known member in the subfamily

Scientific classification
- Kingdom: Animalia
- Phylum: Chordata
- Class: Actinopterygii
- Order: Cichliformes
- Family: Cichlidae
- Subfamily: Astronotinae; Kullander, 1998

Genera
- 3 genera, 6 species

= Astronotinae =

Subfamily of fishes

The Astronotinae are a subfamily of cichlids from South America, where they are found in the Amazon, Orinoco, Paraná, and Paraguay River basins, and various rivers in the Guianas. The subfamily includes three genera, each with two species. Although in other classifications all three genera are placed in the subfamily Cichlinae with Astronotus being the only genus in the monogeneric tribe Astronotini of the subfamily Cichlinae and the other two genera being placed in the tribe Cichlini.

== Genera ==
The following three genera are classified in this subfamily by FishBase:

- Astronotus
- Chaetobranchopsis
- Chaetobranchus
