= Oskar =

Oskar may refer to:

== People ==
- Oskar (given name), a masculine given name, including a list of people and fictional characters with the name
- Jón Óskar (1921–1998), Icelandic poet
- Lee Oskar (born 1948), Danish harmonica player, a founding member of the rock-funk fusion group War
- Ludvig Oskar (1874–1951), Estonian painter

== Other uses ==
- Oskar (gene), the Drosophila gene
- Oskar (film), a 1962 Danish comedy
- Oskar (2018 film), 2018 Indian Bengali language comedy film
- 750 Oskar, an asteroid

== See also ==
- SS Prinz Oskar, a German cargo liner launched in 1902
- Oscar (disambiguation)
- Oskars, a list of people with the Latvian masculine given name
