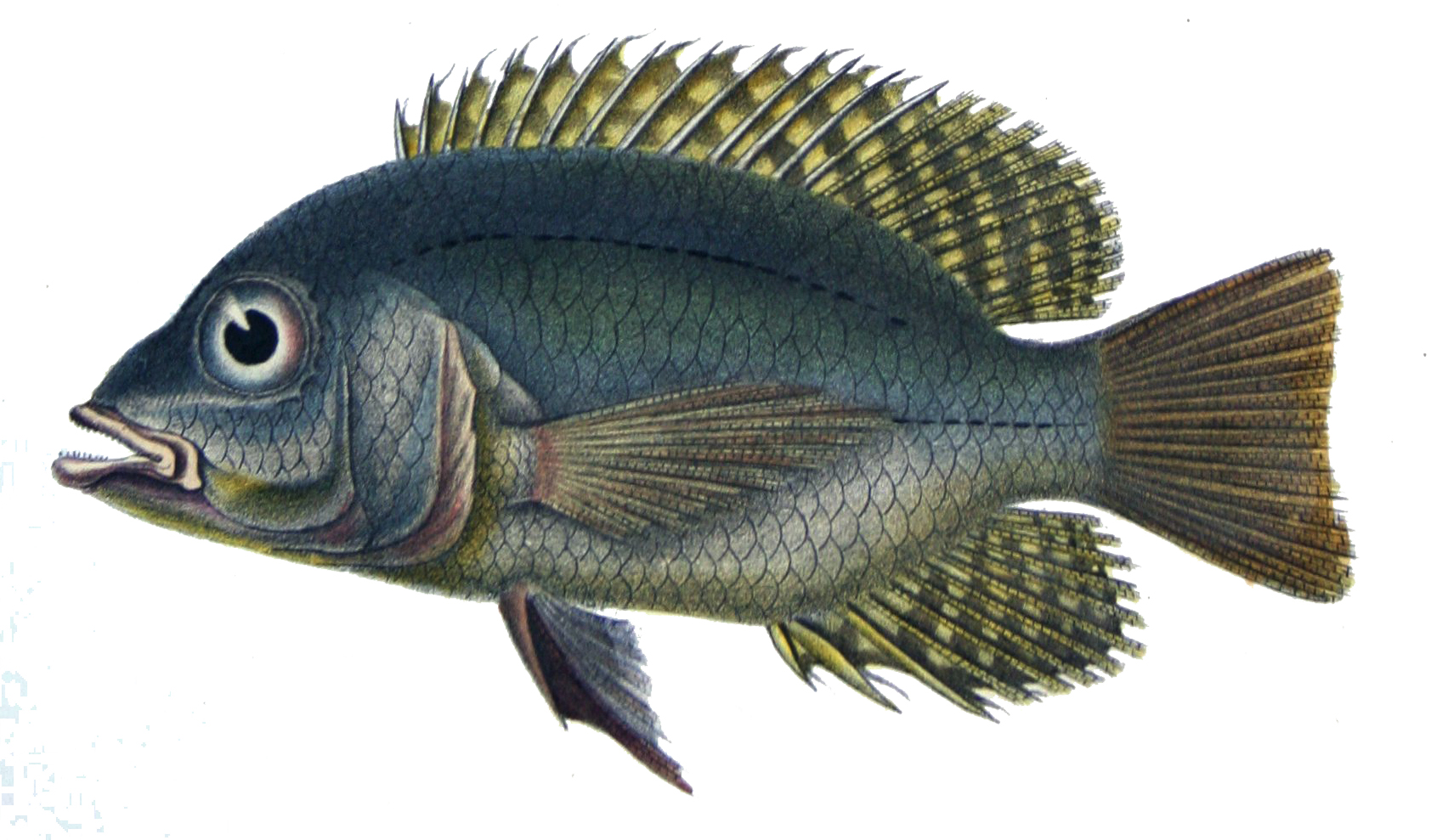
- Chaetobranchus flavescens

Scientific classification
- Kingdom: Animalia
- Phylum: Chordata
- Class: Actinopterygii
- Division: Teleostei
- Order: Cichliformes
- Family: Cichlidae
- Subfamily: Cichlinae
- Tribe: Chaetobranchini; Fernández Yépez, 1951

Type genus
- Chaetobranchus Heckel, 1840

= Chaetobranchini =

Tribe of fishes

Chaetobranchini is a tribe of the subfamily Cichlinae, the American cichlids. They are distributed from the river basin of the Orinoco and the Guianas south to the basins of the Río Paraná and Río Paraguay . The two recognised genera of the Chaetobranchini have been classified together with Astronotus in the subfamily Astronotinae but the consensus is that this genus forms the monogeneric tribe, the Astronotini, these two each being one of the seven tribes in Cichlinae.

== Characteristics ==
The species in Chaetobranchini grow to lengths of 12–24 centimetres (4.7–9.4 in) in length and have an oval, laterally compressed body with a pointed head. They have small mouths and teeth, feed on plankton using filaments on their gill arches as a filter. The chaetobranchins possess a very reduced lower pharyngeal jaw which has elongated lateral processes, a keel and conical teeth. Chaetobranchines are also characterised by their long pointed pectoral fins, which extend almost to the end of the base of the anal fin and the three or four long posterior lateral lines which reach to the caudal fin.

== Genera ==
The two genera included in the Chaetobranchini are:

- Chaetobranchopsis Steindachner, 1875
- Chaetobranchus Heckel, 1840
