= Lake Oscar =

Lake Oscar may refer to the following bodies of water:

- Lake Oscar (Douglas County, Minnesota)
- Lake Oscar (Otter Tail County, Minnesota)

== See also ==
- Lac-Oscar, Quebec, an unorganized territory
