= Oskars =

Male given name

- Gender: Male
- Name day: 14 July

Origin
- Region of origin: Latvia

Other names
- Related names: Oscar, Oszkár, Oskari, Osku

Oskars is a Latvian masculine given name; a variant of the name Oscar. Notable people with the name include:

- Oskars Bārs (1848-1914), Latvian architect
- Oskars Bārtulis (born 1987), Latvian professional ice hockey defenceman
- Oskars Cibuļskis (born 1988), Latvian professional ice hockey defenceman
- Oskars Dankers (1883–1965), Latvian general
- Oskars Gudramovičs (born 1988), Latvian luger and Olympic competitor
- Oskars Kalpaks (1882–1919), Latvian military commander
- Oskars Kastēns (born 1971), Latvian journalist and a politician
- Oskars Ķibermanis (born 1993), Latvian bobsledder and Olympic competitor
- Oskars Kļava (born 1983), Latvian football defender
- Oskars Melbārdis (born 1988), Latvian bobsledder
- Oskars Perro (1918–2003), Latvian soldier and writer
