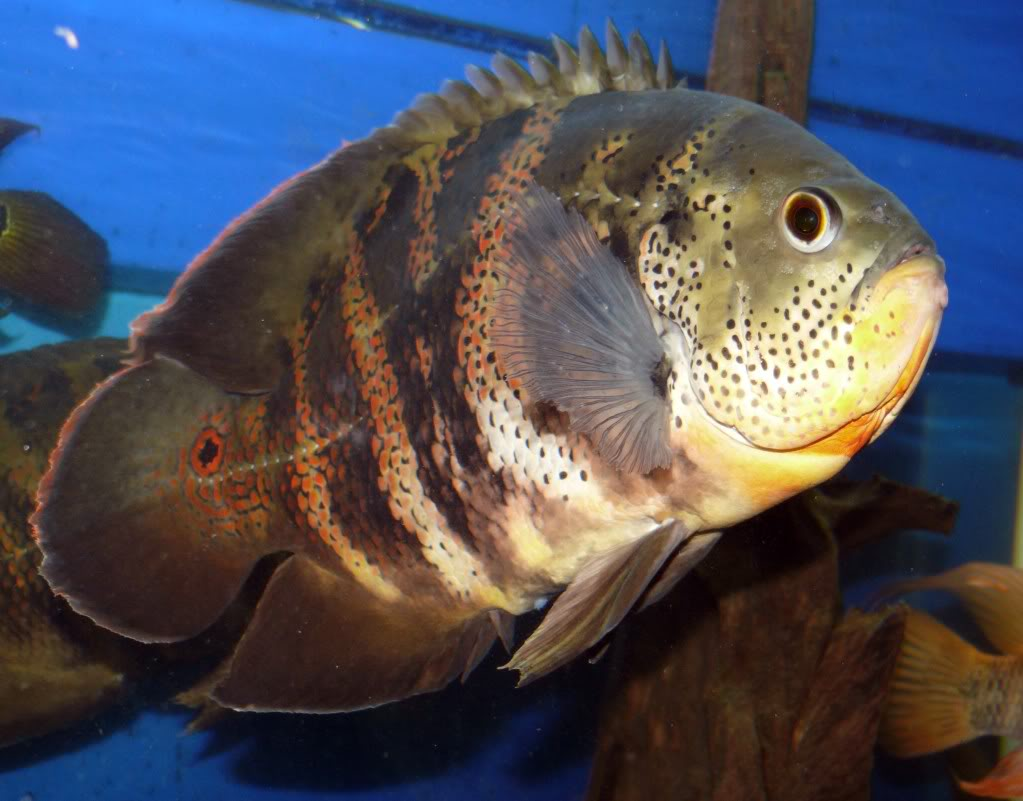

Scientific classification
- Kingdom: Animalia
- Phylum: Chordata
- Class: Actinopterygii
- Order: Cichliformes
- Family: Cichlidae
- Genus: Astronotus
- Species: A. crassipinnis

Binomial name
- Astronotus crassipinnis (Heckel, 1840)

= Astronotus crassipinnis =

Species of fish

Astronotus crassipinnis is a South American fish in the cichlid family from the southern Amazon basin and the Paraná–Paraguay basins. It is not as well-known or common in the aquarium trade as its relative, the more northernly distributed oscar (A. ocellatus). A. crassipinnis reaches up to 25 cm (10 in) in length.

== Etymology ==
The genus name Astronotus comes from the Greek words astra ("ray") and noton ("back"). The species name crassipinnis comes from the Latin words crassus ("fat") and pinna ("fish").

== In the aquarium ==
The species is very rare in the aquarium hobby, where they are sometimes known as "fat oscars". When they appear, they are often mistaken for the common oscar (A. ocellatus).
