= Osku (given name) =

Osku is a Finnish masculine given name. It is a pet form of Oskari and thus a variant of the name Oscar. It may refer to:

- Osku Heinonen (born 1992), Finnish basketball player
- Osku Kuutamo, Finnish 21st century male wheelchair curler and curling coach
- Osku Maukonen (born 2007), Finnish football goalkeeper
- Osku Nurmi, Finnish radio personality
- Osku Palermaa (born 1983), Finnish ten-pin bowler
- Osku Torro (born 1979), Finnish high jumper
