= The Talbot Hotel (Northamptonshire) =

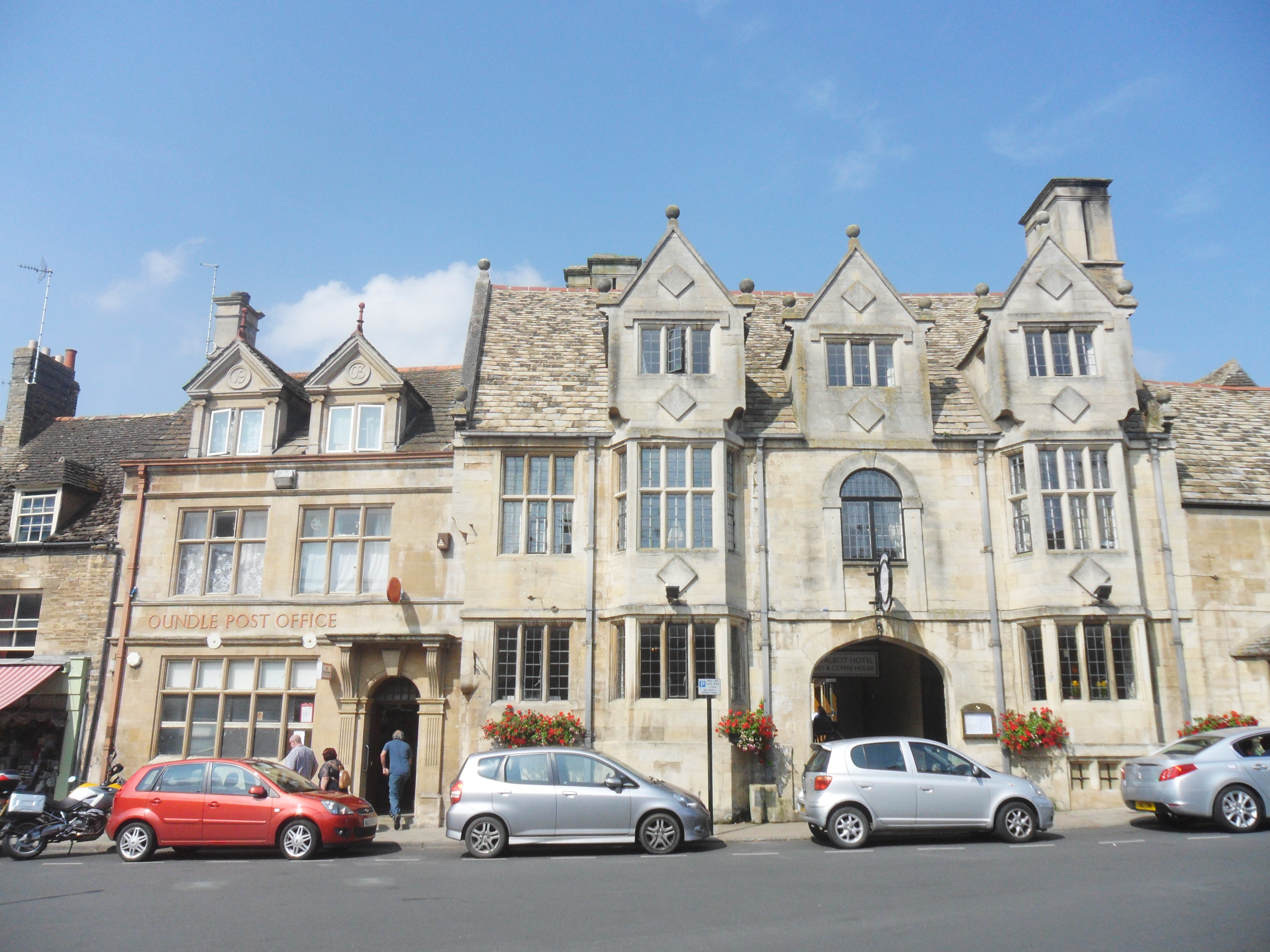

- Location in Northamptonshire

General information
- Location: New Street, Oundle, Northamptonshire, England, New Street; Oundle; Peterborough; PE8 4EA
- Coordinates: 52°28′52″N 0°28′9″W

Other information
- Number of rooms: 34
- Number of restaurants: 1 The Eatery at the Talbot
- Parking: yes

The Talbot Hotel or Talbot Inn is an Elizabethan hotel in Oundle, Northamptonshire, England. It is a Grade I listed building.

== History ==
The site, which included a hotel, about which little is known, was owned by the "Guild of Our Lady of Oundle" which was an association of merchants and traders in the town. When this ceased to function in 1551 it was sold to Thomas Power, who established an inn in 1552. It was rebuilt in 1626, by William Whitwell, when its name was changed from The Tabret or Tabard to The Talbot. The oak staircase, and other parts of the building once belonged to Fotheringhay Castle. The galleried walkway linking the southern wing with the frontage was glazed in the 16th century.

The hotel is reported to be haunted by Mary Queen of Scots who was executed at Fotheringhay in 1587. There are several paintings and mural relating to Queen Mary within the hotel.

In the 18th century The Talbot was owned by John Smith, a brewer. It became a coaching inn, and was the base of a service to London run by George Smith. Another stagecoach operator, Stephen Hodges became the innkeeper. The Smith family regained control and remained the owners until 1922.

== Architecture ==
The limestone building is a "L" shape and has a Collyweston stone slate roof. There are more modern stables and barns to the rear. The timber framed range on the southern wing may have existed before the construction work of 1624. The archway was used as an entrance for the stagecoaches and horses to enter the courtyard and stables.

The interior includes panelling and fireplaces from the 17th century.
