= Prince William School =

Secondary school in Northamptonshire, England (UK)

Location
- Herne Road; Oundle, Northamptonshire, PE8 4BS; England; 52.47705°N 0.46189°W

Information
- Type: Academy
- Established: Opened 1971, Academy 2015
- Local authority: North Northamptonshire
- Department for Education URN: 142063 Tables
- Ofsted: Reports
- Headteacher: Anna Hewes
- Gender: Coeducational
- Age: 11 to 18
- Enrolment: 1170
- Houses: Burley, Talbot, Rockingham, Lyveden
- Website: http://www.princewilliamschool.co.uk/

Map of the school with labels

Prince William School is a secondary school and sixth form located in Oundle, Northamptonshire. The school was built in 1971 and opened by Prince William of Gloucester whose family home, Barnwell Manor, is a few miles away. Prince William was killed in an air crash soon after the school opened. Having opened as Oundle Upper School, it was decided to rename in honour of the Prince who had opened the school just months earlier.

In 2012, the current Duke of Gloucester, Prince Richard, (Prince William's younger brother), commemorated the 40th anniversary of the school when he revealed a plaque and toured the school with students and staff.

In 2015, the school reopened as an academy. It is now part of the East Midlands Academy Trust. Following local transition to a two-tier school system in 2015 the school provides education from year 7 all the way through to sixth form. The school serves as the main secondary school for much of East Northamptonshire with children coming from various villages and schools, the biggest feeder schools being Thrapston Primary School and Oundle CofE Primary School.

A 2017 Ofsted report rated the school as 'Requires Improvement'. In January 2020, Ofsted's report upgraded the school to a 'Good' rating.

== Departments ==
Prince William School itself is broken into different specialized blocks:

The Sutton Maths Department.

The Science Department

The Drama Studio

The Humanities Department

The Design Department

There is an Applied Learning Centre built on the former tennis courts, which from 2017, became the new Sixth Form main working centre.

The English Department

The Languages Department

The Music Department

The Computer Science Department

From September 2015, the school provided updated modular blocks, teaching a variety of subjects including Maths, English, Business Studies and Religious Studies.

== Notable former pupils ==
- Himesh Patel, actor who appeared in the British soap opera EastEnders from 2007 to 2016 and the lead in the 2019 film Yesterday, directed by Danny Boyle, attended Prince William School.
