= Oundle International Festival =

Coordinates: 52.4821°N 0.4691°W

Oundle International Festival (OIF) is an annual community arts festival and organ school (ages 14 to 24) held in Oundle, England.

The festival was founded in 1985 with the training of young organists as its core component and has a festival programme for the general public.

The summer schools are centred around an organ, built by Frobenius and installed in Oundle School Chapel.

Every July OIF runs workshops from an international team of organists, for up to 60 young organists.

== History ==
The Festival and Summer School at inception were part of, and supported by, Oundle School, but since 1995 OIF has been an independent company limited by guarantee and a registered charity operating under the name Oundle Music Trust. It has a Management Committee of eight, which meets three times a year.

== Festival ==
The festival committee promotes three activities:

- Oundle for Organists – a year-round training movement, promoting access to the organ, and supporting young organists (beginner to university level) in their musical development.
- Oundle International Festival – a professional music festival held each July in Oundle and the surrounding area, attracting a growing audience from the local community, and further afield. The programme includes jazz, folk and world music alongside classical repertoire, and related programming in other art forms.
- Oundle Music Trust Community & Education Programme – programme of concerts (including Music in Quiet Places), workshops and projects in the Oundle area, which aims to extend access to, and enjoyment of, music through participation.

Since 1994, a fundraising jazz & firework concert has been held on Oundle School playing fields, which has become the highlight of the year in the small market town of Oundle, attracting an audience of up to 5,000 from across the Midlands.

In 2007, the Festival undertook a community opera for the first time, with three performances of Tobias and the Angel by Jonathan Dove. It was very successful, with three choruses of local people (one comprising around 40 local primary schoolchildren), celebrated professional opera singers and a small orchestra of professional musicians. The performances took place in St Peter's parish church.

== Education for young organists ==
Since July 2002, the Prospective Organ Scholars course has been separated from the main summer school in Oundle and now takes place in Cambridge and Oxford in alternate years. The students are accommodated in an Oxbridge College, and thus are given a real boost prior to their all-important organ scholarship examinations in September. They are required to direct, sing, and accompany three Evensongs in different college chapels, with Compline on two evenings. Mornings and late evening are taken up with organ tuition and practice, with full access being given to college organs in Cambridge and Oxford
