= Oundle =

Market town in Northamptonshire, England

Coordinates: 52.480°N 0.472°W

- Town and Civil Parish
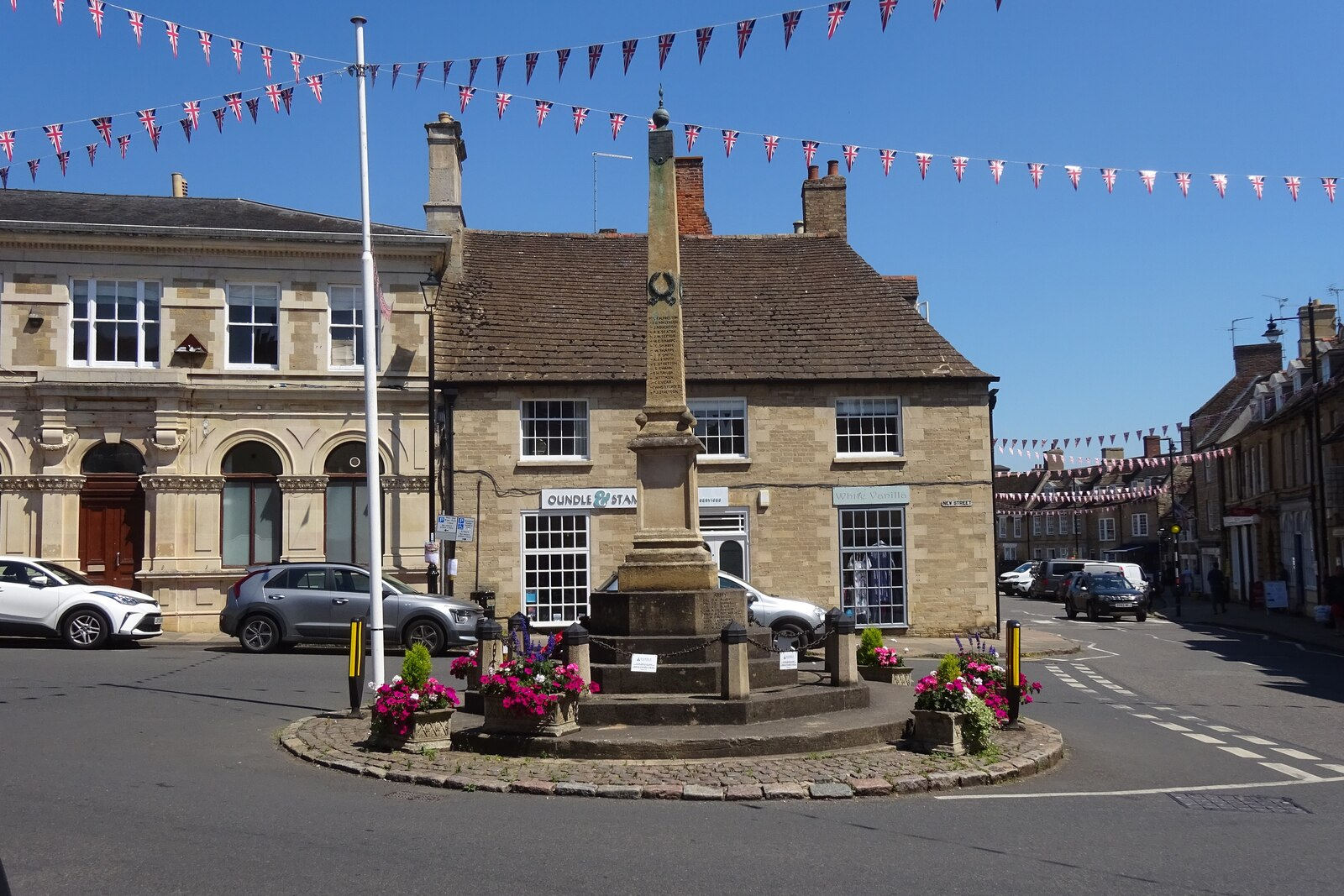
- War Memorial

- Location within Northamptonshire
- Population: 6,254 (2021 census)
- OS grid reference: TL038880
  - London: 69 miles (111 km)
- Civil parish: Oundle
- Unitary authority: North Northamptonshire
- Ceremonial county: Northamptonshire
- Region: East Midlands
- Country: England
- Sovereign state: United Kingdom
- Post town: PETERBOROUGH
- Postcode district: PE8
- Dialling code: 01832
- Police: Northamptonshire
- Fire: Northamptonshire
- Ambulance: East Midlands
- UK Parliament: Corby and East Northamptonshire

Oundle (/ˈaʊndəl/) is a market town and civil parish on the left bank of the River Nene in North Northamptonshire, England, which had a population of 6,254 at the time of the 2021 census. It is 69 miles (111 kilometres) north of London and 12 mi (19 km) south-west of Peterborough. The town is home to Oundle School.

== History ==
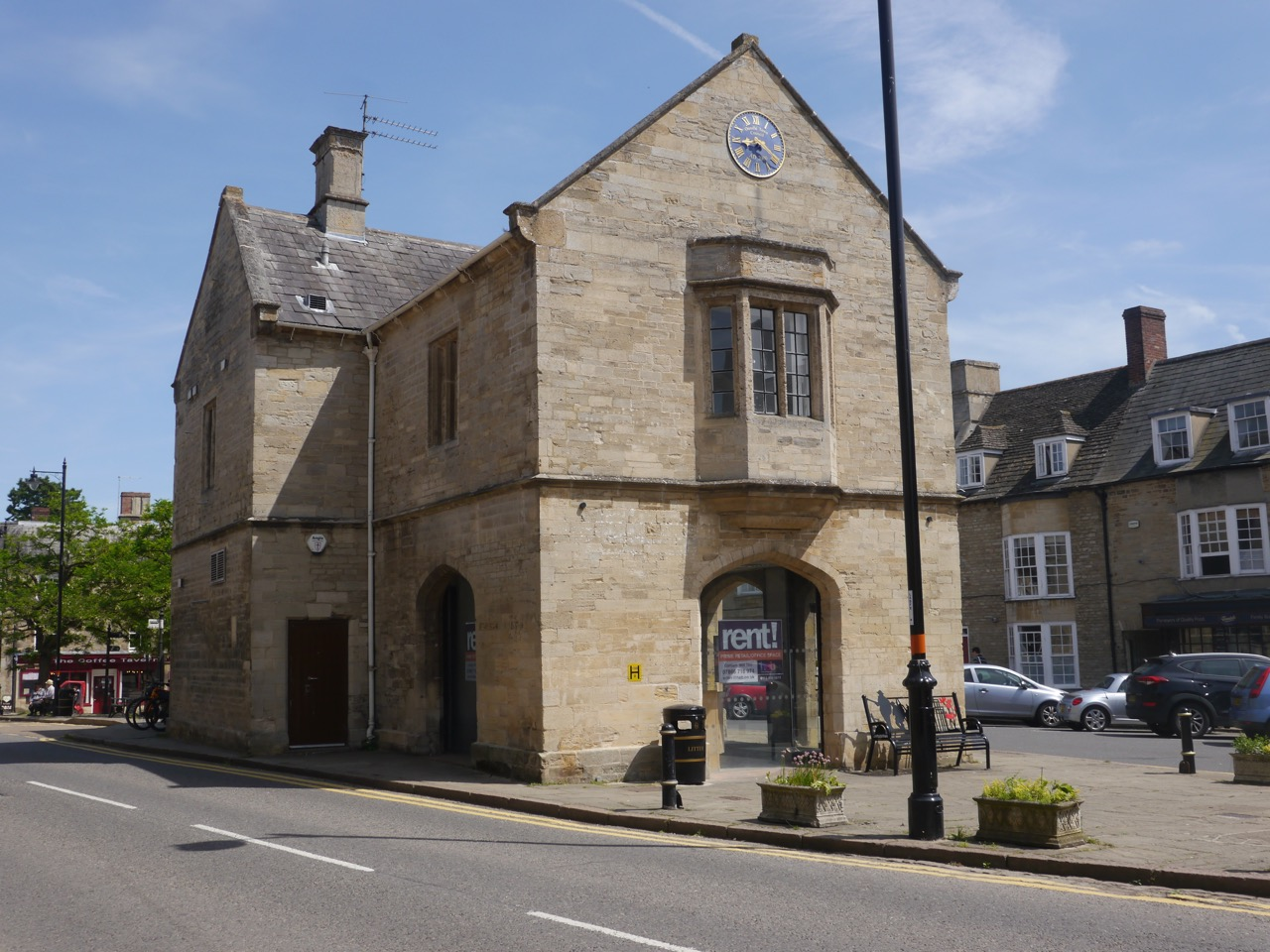
The Old Town Hall

The town's name origin is uncertain. It is probably an old district name, in a grammatical form suggesting a tribal name, 'the Undalas'.

Discoveries of prehistoric and Bronze Age, Iron Age and Roman materials suggest that Oundle has been a settlement location for several thousand years. Findings have included a number of Iron Age coins, and Roman bronze pins, coins and skeletons. A significant Roman find was part of a Roman cup discovered in the church yard of St Peter's Church in the early 19th century. Further excavation on the site led to the findings of many Roman coins, some from the time of the reign of Emperor Claudius. The finding of red tile and building stone at a site near Ashton Road, Oundle is seen as suggestive that there may have been a Roman villa there; a nearby archaeological evaluation found a ditch containing fragments of Romano-British pottery.

The Anglo-Saxon invasion saw the arrival of a tribe called Undalas which possibly meant undivided. Oundle was the site of a hospitium, a building used by monks to give shelter and assistance to travellers, which dates back to 638 AD. It is the death place of St Wilfrid in 709 AD where he had consecrated a church as well as being the location of one of his monasteries. The current St Peter's Church occupies the same site as St Wilfrid's original church.

The first clear reference to Oundle is to be found in a 715 account by Eddi, who was the chantor to St Wilfrid, who referred to it as Undolum. Bede variously refers to it as Inundalum and Undulana mœgð.

Saint Cetta or Cett, is the patron saint of Oundle. Very little is known of him but according to the Anglo-Saxon Secgan manuscript he was buried in the monastery at Oundle, near the River Nene. A chapel to him was built in the 11th century, on the small knoll beyond the end of St Osyths Lane. This and the market charter granted in 972 explain the growth of Oundle in the 12th century.

The Domesday Book of 1086 records Oundle in Polebrook hundred with a population of 36 households, a mill and a value in 1066 of £0.3, which had risen to £11 by 1086.

There has been a grammar school in Oundle since at least 1465, at which Sir William Laxton (Lord Mayor of London) was educated. In his will he left a legacy to found Laxton Grammar School in 1556, now known as Oundle School, administered by the Worshipful Company of Grocers.

In 1743 a group of mutineers from the Black Watch were captured at Ladywood, near Oundle. They had deserted in protest at being sent abroad, instead of patrolling the Highlands, for which the regiment had been raised. The Old Town Hall, which replaced an earlier building on the same site dating back to the 16th century, was completed in 1830.

== Governance ==
Oundle is part of the parliamentary constituency of Corby and East Northamptonshire. The current Member of Parliament (MP) for Corby is Lee Barron of the Labour Party, who was elected in July 2024.

At a local level, the town elects 12 people every four years to the Oundle Town Council. The council is a non-politically affiliated group that works to further the social and economic interests of Oundle. A Mayor and Deputy Mayor are elected by the council every May.

== Geography ==
Oundle is a town located in the North Northamptonshire district of Northamptonshire county, on the River Nene, with Corby 9 miles to the west, and Peterborough 12 miles to the north-east. Oundle falls into the 'PE8' post-code district for Peterborough.

The Oundle Parish consists of approximately 900 hectares and covers the entire urban build, as well as open countryside. The boundary follows the River Nene to the East and South of the town, and extends west to Oundle Wood and north to Park Wood. This boundary was established during an extensive East Northants Boundary review in 2013.

=== Geology ===
The region itself is located on solid formations from the Jurassic age, with Oundle being built on the sedimentary rock oolite.

== Economy ==
Oundle is home to one of two factories producing luxury motor yachts for Fairline Yachts Ltd. The original company, Fairline Boats, which was also located in Oundle entered administration in 2015 before being acquired by Russian investors in January 2016.

== Landmarks ==
=== Public houses ===
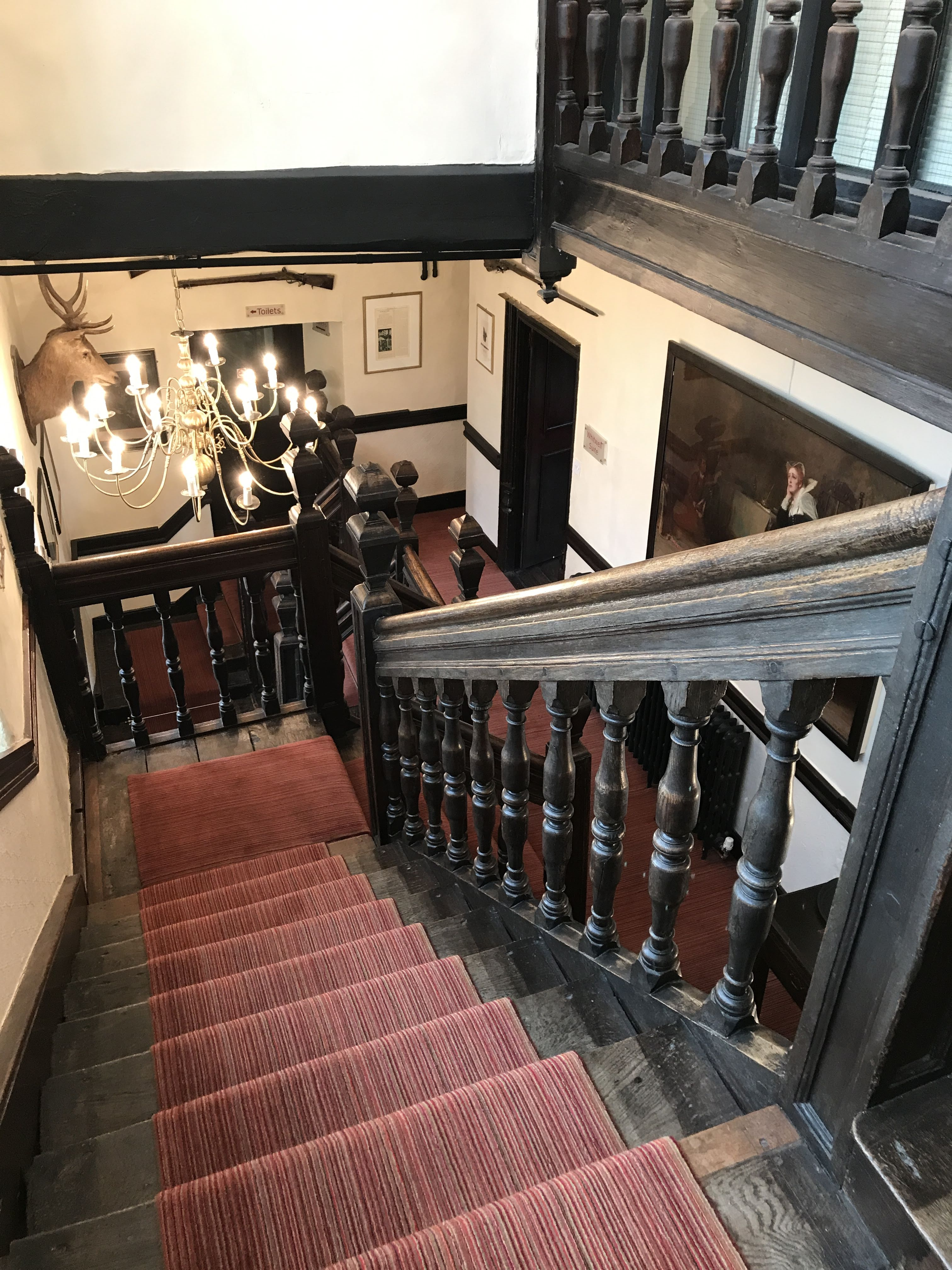
Internal View of Oak Staircase within The Talbot Hotel

Among the oldest buildings is the Talbot Hotel. This was constructed of timber; it was rebuilt with stone in 1626 from the ruins of nearby Fotheringhay Castle. The hotel is notable for the claim of being haunted by the ghost of Mary, Queen of Scots, who was executed in Fotheringhay in 1587. The hotel is said to contain the oak staircase taken from the ruins of Fotheringhay Castle that Mary walked down while being escorted to her execution. The hotel has a room named the Drumming Well Room, named after a well in a yard that was reputed to produce a drumming noise warning of events of ill-omen or of imminent death.

Other public houses include The Rose & Crown, a 17th-century inn, The Ship Inn, a 14th-century coaching inn, The George, and The Riverside, which has become derelict.

=== Churches ===
There are a number of churches. By far the most prominent, its 210-foot spire being the tallest in Northamptonshire, is St Peter's Church which has the main churchyard. There are also Methodist, Baptist and Roman Catholic churches. The Baptist church has a premises on St Osyth's Lane but holds services on Sunday mornings at Oundle Church of England Primary School.

=== The Stahl Theatre ===
The Stahl Theatre is a 264-seat theatre venue owned by Oundle School that was previously a disused Congregational Church chapel on West Street. Oundle School, under the instruction of then housemaster John Harrison, bought the building in the late 1970s and converted the chapel into the theatre which opened for performances in 1980. Harrison became the building's director and produced many performances before his retirement in 1993. In 2012 he returned to produce Love's Labour's Lost, his 100th Stahl Theatre production before his death in 2018. The building is named after Ronald Stahl, a US citizen who lived in Oundle in 1900. Today, the theatre is used by a variety of local groups, including Oundle School, Oundle Church of England Primary school and the local Oundle Gilbert & Sullivan Players.

=== War memorial ===
The war memorial, known officially as the Oundle and Ashton War Memorial, is located at the junction of New Street and West Street. Constructed in 1920 at a cost of £600, it was unveiled on 14 November 1920 by Frederick William Sanderson and dedicated at the same ceremony by Canon Smalley Law, the Vicar of Oundle. Originally commemorating the local lives lost during the First World War, it also includes dedications to those killed in the Second World War. The memorial takes the form of a five-stepped octagonal base surmounted by two square plinths and a slightly tapering rectangular pillar. In turn, this is further surmounted by a small cross. The memorial was classed as a Grade II listed building by Historic England on 7 June 1974, which classes it as a 'particularly important building of more than special interest.'

The memorial has inscriptions to 95 people killed in the two wars. 68 for the First World War and 27 for the Second World War. The now closed Oundle Middle School took the names of four of those inscribed on the memorial as names of its school houses, those were D.F. Barber, J.L. Marlow, J.H. Mason and P. Richardson. All four served in the Royal Air Force during the Second World War.

== Transport ==
=== Road ===
Oundle is located off the A605 that links the A14 at Thrapston to the A1 at Peterborough. The road at Oundle underwent major improvements in 1985 resulting in the Oundle bypass being opened on 12 December 1985 by Princess Alice, Duchess of Gloucester and is commemorated by a plinth and brass plaque at the roundabout.

=== Rail ===
With the definitive closure of Oundle railway station in late 1972, there are currently no rail links operating in Oundle. The station originally opened in June 1845 and was designed by John Livock, a prominent architect at the time who was best known for his railway station construction. The original station building is still in use today as private residential property.

=== Bus ===
There is no main bus station in Oundle, however, there are regular services stopping in the market place with several other stops located throughout the town. The primary bus route servicing Oundle daily is the Stagecoach Midlands operated X4 that links Northampton and Peterborough.

== Education ==
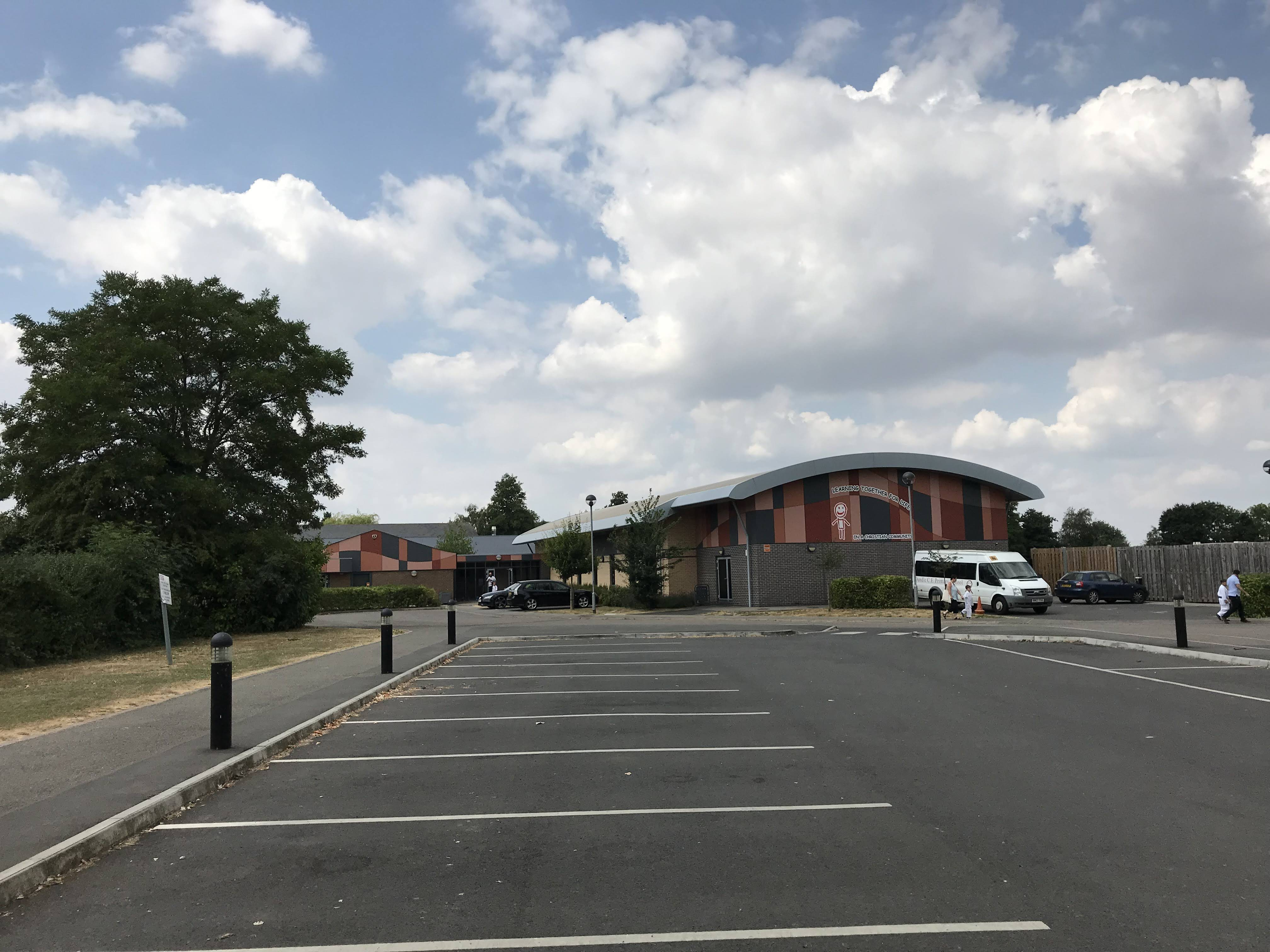
View of the entry to Oundle Church of England Primary School.

The town's most notable school is Oundle School, a public school with around a thousand pupils, most of whom are boarders. The two other schools in the town are Prince William School, a comprehensive school named after the late Prince William of Gloucester, and Oundle Church of England Primary School, which rated as "Outstanding" in its 2011 Ofsted inspection.

== Media ==
Local news and television programmes are provided by BBC East and ITV Anglia. Television signals are received from the Sandy Heath TV transmitter, BBC East Midlands and ITV Central can also be received from the Waltham TV transmitter.

The town is covered by both BBC Radio Northampton and BBC Radio Cambridgeshire. Other radio stations including Heart East, Smooth East Midlands (formerly Connect FM) and OSCAR Radio, a school-based radio station which broadcast from Oundle School.

Local newspapers are the Peterborough Telegraph and Nene Valley News, an independent community newspaper.

== Culture and community ==
Oundle hosts a number of annual events, notably:

- The Oundle International Festival (OIF) is an annual music festival and pipe organ school, founded in 1985, with the training of young organists as its core. These summer schools are centred on a Frobenius organ in the Oundle School chapel. A concurrent festival programme for the public was also planned as a recurrent feature.
- The Oundle Festival of Literature has regular events throughout the year featuring established, local and new authors.
- The Oundle Fringe Festival is an annual arts and entertainment festival that began in 2011 to help showcase local musical and literary performers. It has grown rapidly since its inception and takes place over a 10-day period every July, with performances of genres of music such as rock and jazz, and also literary readings and theatrical performances.
- The Oundle carnival has taken place since 2009.

A farmers' market is held in the Market Place on the second Saturday of every month as well as a local market every Thursday. There is a park with swings and climbing frames, as well as a skatepark built in 2005 and regenerated in 2012. An annual fair and circus is held in the park.

Oundle has shops, pubs, cafés and restaurants in the town centre. It also has three supermarkets: a Co-op, a Waitrose and a Tesco.

== Filming locations ==
External shots for the 2012 Daniel Radcliffe film The Woman in Black were filmed at Cotterstock Hall just north of Oundle.

In September 2022 filming occurred in Oundle for the fifth season of the Netflix series The Crown. Filming took place at the corner of the Market Place and North Street.

== Town partnerships ==
Oundle maintains partnerships with the following places:

- Andrésy, France
- Nauort, Germany

== Notable people ==
- William Abell – a vintner (wine merchant) born in Oundle
- George Blagden – actor who was accepted into Oundle School on a drama scholarship and performed various roles at the town's Stahl Theatre. He has since appeared in television shows such as Vikings and Versailles, and also the 2012 movie Les Misérables.
- Richard Dawkins (born 1941) – a scientist educated in Oundle
- Bruce Dickinson – frontman of Iron Maiden; attended Oundle School.
- Marian Hobbs – former politician (formerly on the staff of Prince William School)
- John Knight – cricketer
- Louise Mensch – briefly the local Member of Parliament (MP), lived in Oundle
- Himesh Patel – actor who appeared in the British soap opera EastEnders from 2007 to 2016 and stars in the 2019 film Yesterday directed by Danny Boyle attended Prince William School.
- Ebenezer Prout – a musical theorist and composer born in Oundle.
- Miriam Louisa Rothschild DBE FRS (1908–2005), zoologist, entomologist and botanist, died in Oundle
- Ivo Watts-Russell – founder of independent record label 4AD was born nearby and went to school in Oundle

== Sport ==
=== Football ===
- Oundle Town Football Club – founded in 1883 and currently playing in the Peterborough and District Football League Division 1. As well as the senior teams, Oundle Town FC also have minis, youth and junior teams, as well as walking, vets, ladies and girls teams.

=== Rugby ===
- Oundle Rugby Club – founded in 1976, has a senior team playing in the Regional 1 South East division, as well as junior and mini teams.

=== Cricket ===
- Oundle Town Cricket Club – founded in 1826 the 1st XI senior team currently play in the Northamptonshire Cricket League Premier division. They also have a ladies and girls teams as well as operating 6 junior teams.

=== Hockey ===
- Oundle Hockey Club – founded in 2012, the club has 1 Men's Team and 2 Ladies' Teams, along with a juniors section. The club currently plays in the Midlands Hockey League. They currently play their matches at Oundle School.
