= John Knight (cricketer) =

English cricketer (born 1958)

Personal information
- Full name: John Mark Knight
- Born: 16 March 1958 (age 68); Oundle, Northamptonshire, England
- Batting: Right-handed
- Bowling: Right-arm fast-medium

Domestic team information
- Years: Team
- 1977–1982: Wiltshire
- 1978–1981: Oxford University

Career statistics
Competition	First-class	List A
Matches	23	6
Runs scored	318	77
Batting average	9.93	19.25
100s/50s	–/–	–/1
Top score	41*	54*
Balls bowled	2,824	231
Wickets	32	3
Bowling average	44.50	77.50
5 wickets in innings	–	–
10 wickets in match	–	–
Best bowling	4/69	1/13
Catches/stumpings	3/–	1/–
- Source: Cricinfo, 26 June 2019

John Mark Knight (born 16 March 1958) is an English former cricketer.

Knight was born at Oundle in March 1958 and educated at Oundle School. He studied at Worcester College, Oxford. While studying at the University of Oxford, he made his debut in first-class cricket for Oxford University against Somerset at Oxford in 1978. He played first-class cricket for Oxford until 1981, making a total of 23 appearances. He scored a total of 318 runs in these matches, at an average of 9.93 and a high score of 41 not out. With his right-arm fast-medium bowling, he took 32 wickets at a bowling average of 44.50, with best figures of 4 for 69.

In addition to playing first-class cricket, Knight also played List A one-day for the Combined Universities cricket team, making six appearances in the Benson & Hedges Cup between 1978–81. He scored 77 runs in his six matches, with a high score of 54 not out against Northamptonshire in the 1979 Benson & Hedges Cup. He also 2 wickets, though coming at an expensive average of 77.50. He also played minor counties cricket for Wiltshire between 1977–82, making eighteen appearances in the Minor Counties Championship.
