= Old Town Hall, Oundle =

Former municipal building in Oundle, Northamptonshire, England

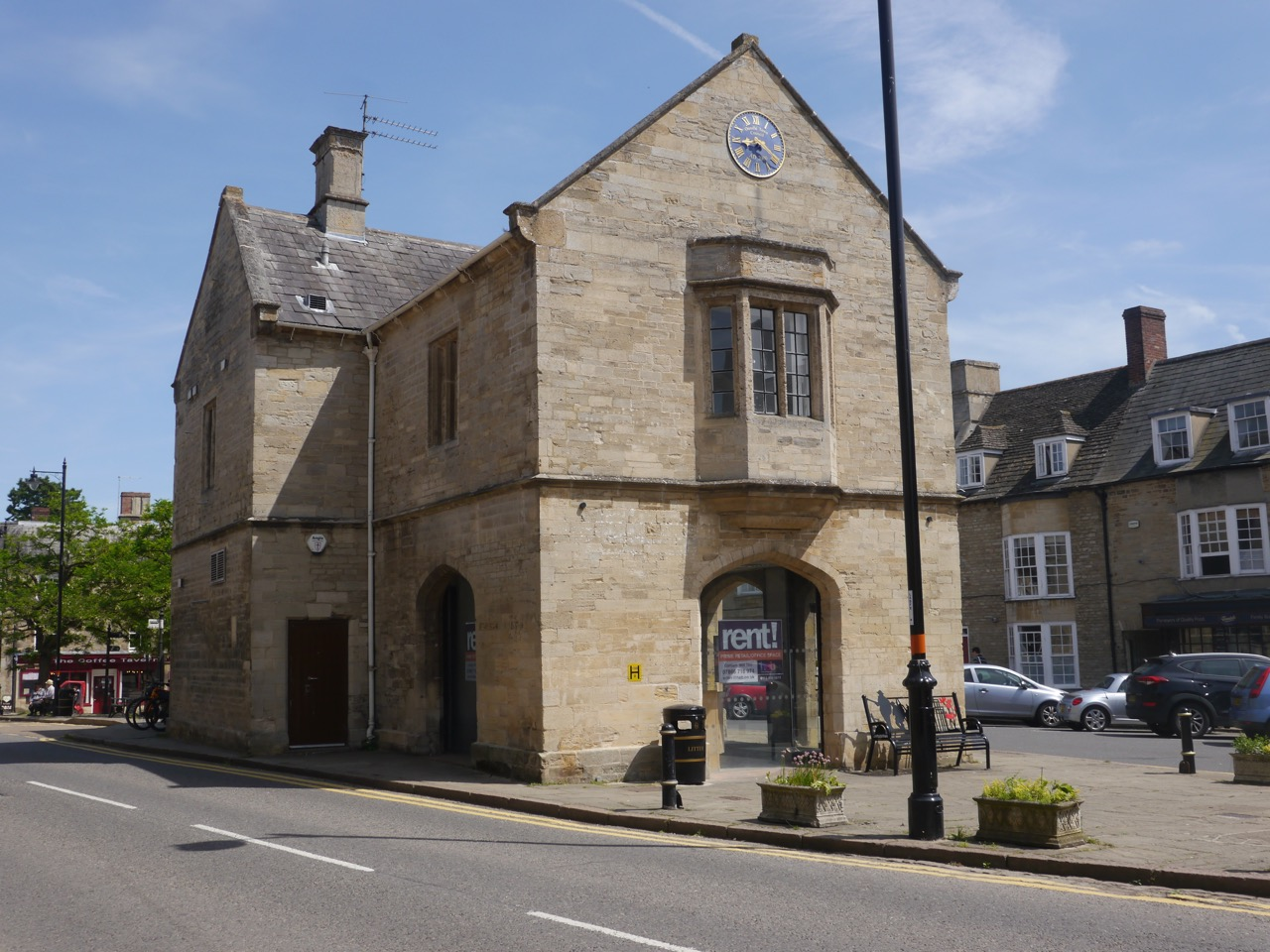
- Old Town Hall

- Shown in Northamptonshire
- 52.4809°N 0.4674°W
- Location: Market Place, Oundle

History
- Built: 1830

Site notes
- Architectural style: Neoclassical style

Listed Building – Grade II
- Official name: The Town Hall
- Designated: 18 June 1955
- Reference no.: 1372119

The Old Town Hall is a former municipal building in the Market Place in Oundle, Northamptonshire, England. The building, which is now let to commercial tenants, is a Grade II listed building.

== History ==
The first municipal building in the town was a market hall which dated back at least to the 16th century: it was adjacent to the market cross, which was stood at the east end of the Market Place, and was flanked by two rows of stalls known as the Butchers' Row. In the early 19th century, the market hall was considered to be "disfiguring the Market Place" and, following implantation of the Oundle Improvement Act 1825, the new improvement commissioners decided to demolish the market hall, the market cross and the Butchers' Row. The lord of the manor and member of parliament, Jesse Watts-Russell of Ilam Hall, agreed to pay for a new town hall.

Construction work on the new building started in 1826. It was designed in the neoclassical style, built in ashlar stone and was completed in 1830. The building was laid out to a cruciform plan and was arcaded on the ground floor so that markets could be held, with an assembly hall on the first floor: it was described in the National Gazetteer as being "commodious".

The design involved a symmetrical main frontage with five bays facing the south side of the Market Place; the central bay, which projected forward and was gabled, featured an oriel window on the first floor and a coat of arms in the gable. The flanking bays and the outer bays were fenestrated by two-light and three-light mullioned windows respectively. The west elevation also featured an oriel window while the east elevation featured a three-light mullioned window. In the 19th century, the assembly room on the first floor was used as the meeting place of the improvement commissioners.

After completion of the Oundle Courthouse in Mill Road 1877 and the Queen Victoria Hall in West Street in 1904, activity in the town hall reduced significantly and it fell into a state of disrepair. Oundle Urban District Council, which had been established in 1894 and was based at council offices in North Street, commissioned a complete "reconstruction and reconditioning" of the building in 1937. Following local government reorganisation in 1974, the successor local authority, East Northamptonshire District Council sought commercial uses for the building and Norwich and Peterborough Building Society became the main occupant in December 1981. Following rationalisation by Yorkshire Building Society, which acquired Norwich and Peterborough Building Society in 2011, the branch closed in 2017. The building was subsequently occupied by a variety of local businesses including a firm of estate agents.
