= Lake Oscar (Otter Tail County, Minnesota) =

Lake in the state of Minnesota, United States

- Location within Minnesota
- Location: Otter Tail County, Minnesota
- Coordinates: 46°22′18″N 96°13′39″W
- Type: lake

Lake Oscar is a lake in Otter Tail County, in the U.S. state of Minnesota.

Lake Oscar was named for Oscar II of Sweden.

== See also ==
- List of lakes in Minnesota
