= Oscar Danielson =

Oscar Danielson may refer to:

- Oscar Danielson (rugby league)
- Oscar Danielson (singer)
