= Oscar Brown (disambiguation) =

Oscar Brown (1926–2005) is an American singer, songwriter, playwright and poet.

Oscar Brown may also refer to:

- Oscar Brown Sr. (1895–1990), American lawyer, businessman and community activist
- Oscar Brown (baseball) (1946–2020), American baseball outfielder
