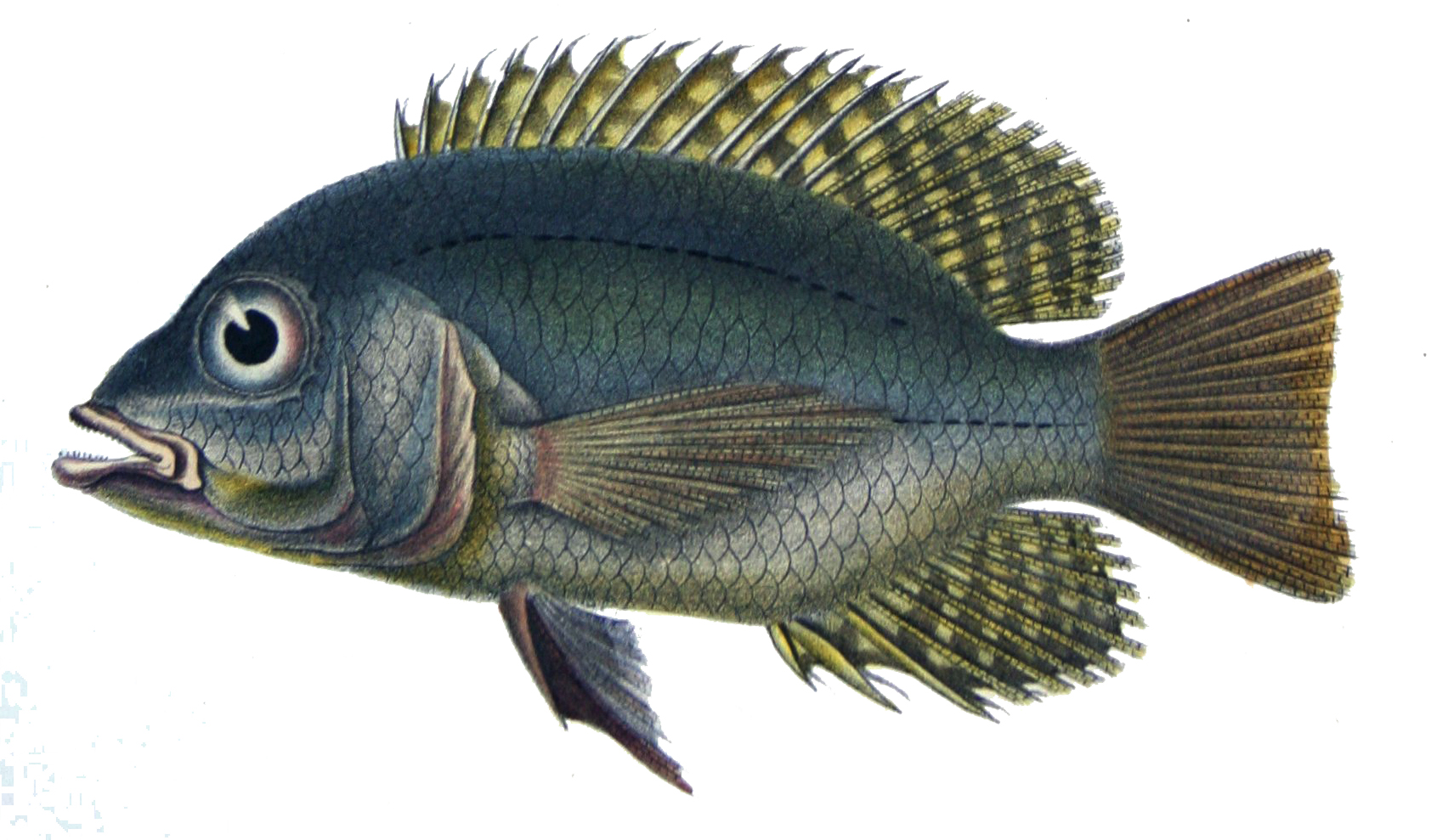
- C. flavescens

Scientific classification
- Domain: Eukaryota
- Kingdom: Animalia
- Phylum: Chordata
- Class: Actinopterygii
- Order: Cichliformes
- Family: Cichlidae
- Tribe: Chaetobranchini
- Genus: Chaetobranchus; Heckel, 1840

Type species
- Chaetobranchus flavescens Heckel, 1840

= Chaetobranchus =

Genus of fishes

Chaetobranchus is a small genus of cichlid fishes from South America where they are native to the Amazon Basin, Orinoco Basin and rivers in the Guianas.

== Species ==
There are currently two recognized species in this genus:

- Chaetobranchus flavescens Heckel, 1840
- Chaetobranchus semifasciatus Steindachner, 1875
