= Oscar Acosta =

Oscar Acosta may refer to:

- Oscar Zeta Acosta (1935–1974), American attorney, politician, novelist and activist
- Oscar Acosta (baseball) (1957–2006), American baseball player and pitching coach
- Oscar Acosta (footballer) (born 1964), Argentine football midfielder
- Oscar Acosta (Honduran writer) (1933–2014), Honduran poet and diplomat
