= Oszkár =

Oszkár is a Hungarian masculine given name, a variant of the name Oscar. Notable people with the name include:

- Oszkár Asboth (1891–1960), Austro-Hungarian aviation engineer sometimes credited with the invention of the helicopter
- Oszkár Beregi, also known as Oscar Beregi (actor, born 1876) (1876–1965), Hungarian-Jewish actor
- Oszkár Frey (born 1953), Hungarian sprint canoer
- Oszkár Gerde (1883–1944), Hungarian double Olympic team champion sabre fencer
- Oszkár Jászi (1875–1957), Hungarian social scientist, historian and politician
- Oszkár Kálmán (1887–1971), Hungarian operatic bass
- Oszkár Maleczky (1894–1972), Hungarian operatic baritone
- Oszkár Molnár (born 1956), Hungarian politician
- Oszkár Nagy (1893–1965), Hungarian painter
- Oszkár Seszták (born 1965), Hungarian politician
- Oszkar Tordai Schilling (1880–?), Hungarian artist
- Oszkár Szendrő (1889–1947), Hungarian international footballer
- Oszkár Szigeti (1933–1983), Hungarian footballer
