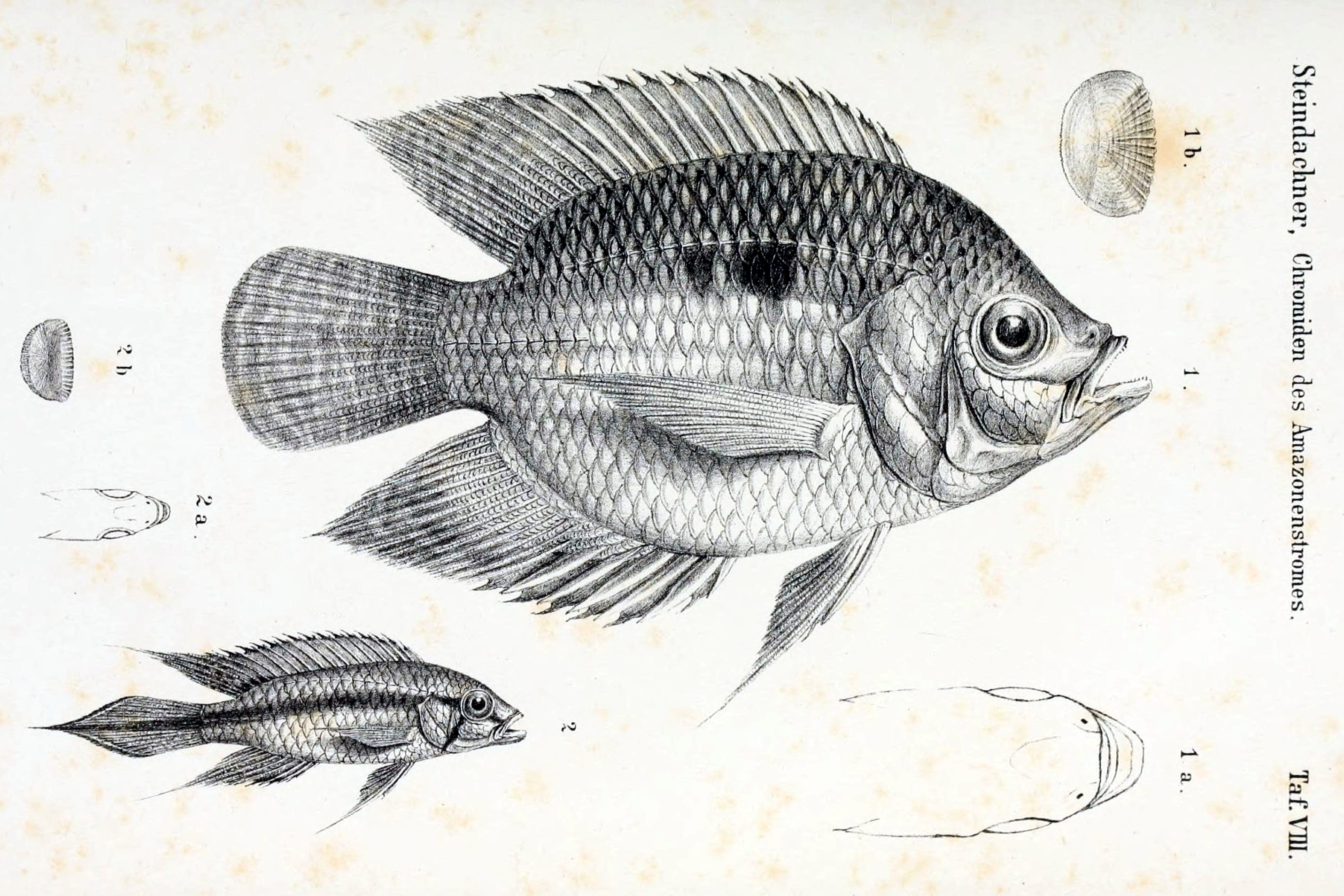
- Chaetobranchopsis orbicularis

Scientific classification
- Domain: Eukaryota
- Kingdom: Animalia
- Phylum: Chordata
- Class: Actinopterygii
- Order: Cichliformes
- Family: Cichlidae
- Tribe: Chaetobranchini
- Genus: Chaetobranchopsis; Steindachner, 1875

Type species
- Chaetobranchus orbicularis Steindachner, 1875

= Chaetobranchopsis =

Genus of fishes

Chaetobranchopsis is a small genus of cichlid fishes from South America, where they are found in the Amazon, Paraná and Paraguay river basins.

== Species ==
There are currently two recognized species in this genus:

- Chaetobranchopsis australis C. H. Eigenmann & Ward, 1907
- Chaetobranchopsis orbicularis (Steindachner, 1875)
