= OSCAR Radio =

- Northamptonshire; England
- Broadcast area: Oundle School

History
- First air date: 1997

Links
- Website: oscar-radio.org

OSCAR Radio is a school radio station established in Oundle School in Northamptonshire, England. It is one of the longest running school FM radio stations in the UK, and used to broadcast on 87.7 MHz, 87.9 MHz & 96.3 MHz FM and now does so via the Internet during its term-time active periods. It makes use of a UK restricted service licence to broadcast worldwide via its website for up to eight weeks a year. It is notable as being the only station that is run entirely by the students who are 18 and under. The current managing director is Oliver Morrow.

OSCAR Radio had 39 short-term FM licences to broadcast (two every year) and the material broadcast is original with all the shows being generated from within Oundle School and supporters. The transmitter power, and hence the transmission area, was at the maximum allowed by Ofcom for the licence and covers around 30 square miles (78 km^{2}) from the centre of Oundle. Since it started broadcasting in 1998, over 2500 young people from within the school and surrounding area have been involved.

== History ==
OSCAR was founded in September 1997, when a group of teachers and pupils presented the case for a school radio station to senior management, following a consultant assessment of the school's suitability for hosting such an ambitious project. After the presentation it was agreed that money raised by the Oundle School Foundation could be used to set up the project. In January 1998, £70,000 was transferred to the school and a contract with a radio installation company was arranged to provide a radio control room, a newsroom, and a recording studio ready for a launch in November 1998.

The name OSCAR Radio was chosen by Fleur Swaney, the first female Head of School. The name was originally an acronym for "Oundle School Community and Action Radio", although today OSCAR is accepted as a stand-alone identity.

OSCAR Radio was granted its first restricted service licence (RSL) to broadcast for 28 days on 14 November 1998. Samantha Griffiths was its first managing director and Lucy Newman was the first station controller. Since then the station has broadcast for a total of over 30 RSLs with the latest one in 2014.

In 2003, OSCAR Radio moved to its own purpose-built studios, designed by the then managing director, 18-year-old Sandy Rowell. Located on North Street in Oundle, the 18th Century "Old Dryden" building hosts a fully equipped broadcast studio featuring a computer playout system, a separate newsroom, DJ booth, an archive area and 8 production workstations, capable of functioning as a copy of a current small-scale UK radio station. Sir Howard Stringer, an old boy of the school and chairman of the board of Sony Corporation, opened the newly built studio complex on 14 November, that year.

During the Summer of 2014, OSCAR Radio moved again to the newly renovated 2nd floor of the Gascoigne Building, a site it now shares with Oundle School's Music Technology and Recording facilities.

OSCAR recently retired their FM radio transmitter and now stream exclusively on their recently redesigned website

== Today ==
About 250 students take part in OSCAR Radio in various roles during any single broadcast period: technician, host, newsreader, manager, director, sales and marketing, and other contributory roles.

During OSCAR's broadcast period, the station transmits live between 5pm and 10:15pm every day apart from Sunday. At other times, it broadcasts music and repeats of shows. Students are responsible for both the day-to-day running of the station and the quality of the broadcasts. This gives them the opportunity to take part in a 'real world' project while at school, under the overall supervision of one specially appointed staff member.

OSCAR runs a total of two broadcasts a year, one in November and December and another in February and March.
