= Lake Oscar (Douglas County, Minnesota) =

Lake in the state of Minnesota, United States

- Location within Minnesota
- Location: Douglas County, Minnesota
- Coordinates: 45°49′46″N 95°36′15″W
- Type: lake

Lake Oscar is a lake in Douglas County, in the U.S. state of Minnesota.

According to Warren Upham, Lake Oscar was probably named after Oscar I of Sweden.

== See also ==
- List of lakes in Minnesota
