= Oskar Hultman =

Finnish linguist (1862–1929)

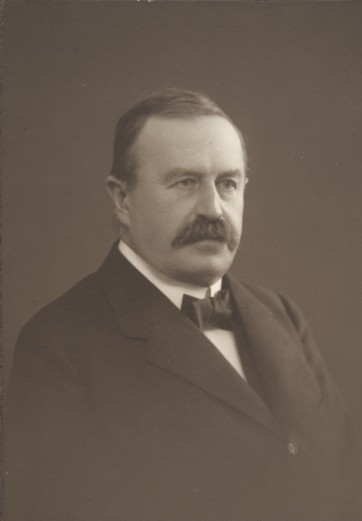
Oskar Hultman. 1916

Oskar Fredrik Hultman (21 December 1862 in Ekenäs, Finland – 31 May 1929, Ekenäs) was a Finland-Swedish linguist. Hultman was a professor of Swedish language and literature at the University of Helsinki, known for his research on the origins of the Swedish-speaking population of Finland.

Hultman was the son of Frithiof Hultman and Amalie Morawitz, the daughter of a German merchant from St. Petersburg. In 1881, Hultman began his studies in Nordic languages, aesthetics, Sanskrit and Indo-European languages at University of Helsinki. He received his master's degree in 1887, after which he studied Nordic languages at Uppsala University for four years. He was a student of Adolf Noreen and during this time began his doctoral dissertation. He was appointed docent of Nordic languages in 1907 and became a professor of Swedish language and literature at the University of Helsinki in 1909. During this time, he also joined the Society of Swedish Literature in Finland.

Hultman married Emilia (Mili) Strömberg in 1890, who had been his fiancée since 1886. Both wife and child died in 1894 after childbirth. In 1910, he married Emmy Stenbäck and they moved to Ekenäs. The pair was interested in the history of the Ekenäs region and wrote several articles on the subject. The articles were often published in the local newspaper Västra Nyland.

== Bibliography ==
- De östsvenska dialekterna (1894, in "Finländska bidrag", published by Svenska landsmålsföreningen i Helsingfors)
- Jöns Buddes bok (1895)
- Förteckning öfver svenska ortnamn i Finland (1897, with Georg Schauman)
- När dog Sigfrid Aronus Forsius? (1898)
- Hälsingelagen och Upplandslagens ärfdabalk i Cod. Ups. B. 49 (1905)
- Det nordiska a-omljudet af kort u, (1908, in the Finnish Society of Sciences and Letters, "Acta", 33)
- Den s.k. u-brytningen (1908, in the Finnish Society of Sciences and Letters, "Acta", 33)
- Axel Olof Freudenthal. Levnadsteckning (1912)
- Upplandslagen (1916, in the Society of Swedish Literature in Finland's "Skrifter", 127)
- Härstamma Finlands svenskar från Sverige? Finsk Tidskrift (1920)
- Finlandssvenskarnas härkomst. Finsk Tidskrift (1921)
- Våra svenska bygdemål, Det svenska Finland II (1922, published by Gabriel Nikander)
- I det gamla Ekenäs (1929, with Ernst Häyrén & Emmy Hultman)
- Efterlämnade skrifter I–II (1931, 1939; by the Society of Swedish Literature in Finland)
