= OScar (Danish automobile) =

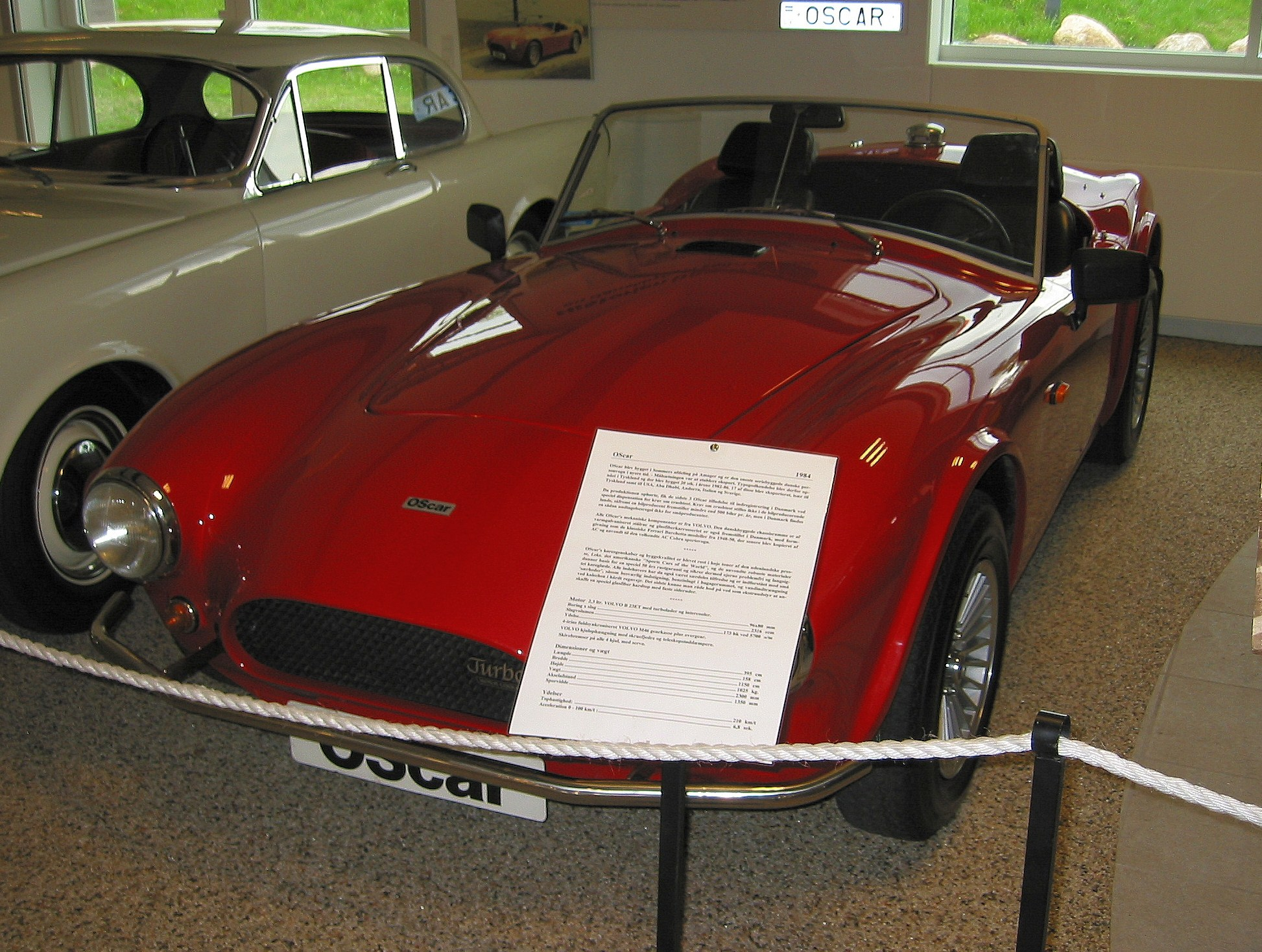
- 1984 OScar at Sommer's Automobile Museum

Overview
- Manufacturer: Ole Sommer
- Production: 20 units
- Model years: 1983-1986
- Assembly: Copenhagen, Denmark
- Designer: Ole Sommer; AC Cars (body)

Body and chassis
- Class: Sports car (S)
- Body style: 2-door roadster
- Layout: Front-engine, rear-wheel-drive

Powertrain
- Engine: Volvo Redblock in-line four cylinder; B19 1,986 cc turbo; B23 2,316 cc turbo
- Transmission: Manual Volvo M46 four-speed

OScar is a limited production sports car produced in Denmark from 1983 to 1986. The car was built by Ole Sommer, a prominent automobile importer and dealer.

== Ole Sommer ==
Ole Sommer was a Danish importer of automobiles and car enthusiast. He found business success importing Volvo, Renault and Jaguar cars into Denmark. Sommer had an interest in producing a car in Denmark and in the 1970s built a few cars called Joker which were a type of beach buggy based on a Volvo 140. In the 1980s, Sommer set his sights on building a sports car. Sommer later established an automotive museum. He died in 2018.

== OScar ==
The car was named OScar for "Ole Sommer car". Sommer imported fiberglass body shells based on the AC Cobra from BRA in the United Kingdom. Unlike the multitude of other manufactures who created AC Cobra replicas or imitations, Sommer wanted to use Volvo underpinnings.

The car was built on a custom frame. The engines available were from Volvo: they were straight-four turbocharged Redblocks of the B19 and B23 variety. Customers were offered the option of up-tuning the engine for more than the standard horsepower from the Volvo engine.

OScar featured a Volvo front axle and steering assembly from a 140 and a rear axle from a 240. Electronic components were lifted from a 340. The transmission was a Volvo M46 four-speed. Remaining components were hand-made at Sommer's facility including the exceptionally large 70 liter fuel tank. Instrumentation was custom produced by VDO in Germany.

Sommer had envisaged a larger scale production than the 20 units that were produced. Automotive regulations, including crash testing, made it difficult to sell the car. Volvo also refused to let Sommer use his Volvo dealer network to sell the car.
