= Oskar Nilsson =

Oscar or Oskar Nilsson may refer to:

- Oscar Nilsson (equestrian) (1896–1974), Swedish vaulter who competed in the 1920 Summer Olympics
- Oskar Nilsson (equestrian) (1897–1958), Swedish vaulter who competed in the 1920 Summer Olympics
- Oskar Nilsson (drummer) (born 1988), Swedish drummer
- Oskar Nilsson (ice hockey) (born 1991), Swedish ice hockey defenceman
- Nils Oskar Nilsson (1935–2018), Swedish politician
