= Oskarsson =

Oskarsson, Oskarson, Oscarsson, Oscarson or Óskarsson is a common surname in Sweden and Iceland respectively, and may refer to:

- Albert Óskarsson (born 1968), Icelandic basketball player
- Anna Oskarsson (born 1996), Swedish footballer
- Anne Oskarsson (born 1946), Swedish politician
- Bonnie L. Oscarson (born 1950), Fourteenth president of the Young Women organization of the Church of Jesus Christ of Latter-day Saints
- Christina Oskarsson (born 1951), Swedish social democratic politician
- David Oscarson (born 1966), Swedish American pen designer
- James Oscarson (born 1957), Swedish American politician
- Magnus Oscarsson (born 1970), Swedish politician
- Markus Oscarsson (born 1977), Swedish sprint canoeist
- Mattias Oscarsson (born 1975), Swedish sprint canoeist
- Mikael Oscarsson (born 1967), Swedish Christian Democrat politician
- Mikael Oskarsson, Swedish comic creator, worked in various genres in both fanzine and professional contexts
- Per Oscarsson (1927–2010), Swedish film actor
- Peter Oskarson (born 1951), Swedish theatre director
- Staffan Oscarsson (born 1951), Swedish sports shooter
- Stina Oscarson (1975–2025), Swedish theater director and author
