= King Oscar =

King Oscar may refer to:

== People ==
- Oscar I of Sweden, King of Sweden and Norway
- Oscar II, King of Sweden and Norway

== Others ==
- King Oscar (company), canned seafood brand
