= Oskari =

Oskari is a Finnish masculine given name, a variant of the name Oscar. It may refer to:

- Oskari Friman (1893–1933), Finnish wrestler
- Oskari Frösén (born 1976), Finnish high jumper
- Oskari Mantere (1874–1942), Finnish politician
- Oskari Mörö (born 1993), Finnish hurdler
- Oskari Rissanen (1893–1957), Finnish runner
- Oskari Tokoi (1873-1963), Finnish politician
- Oskari Vilamo (1880-1952), Finnish executive
