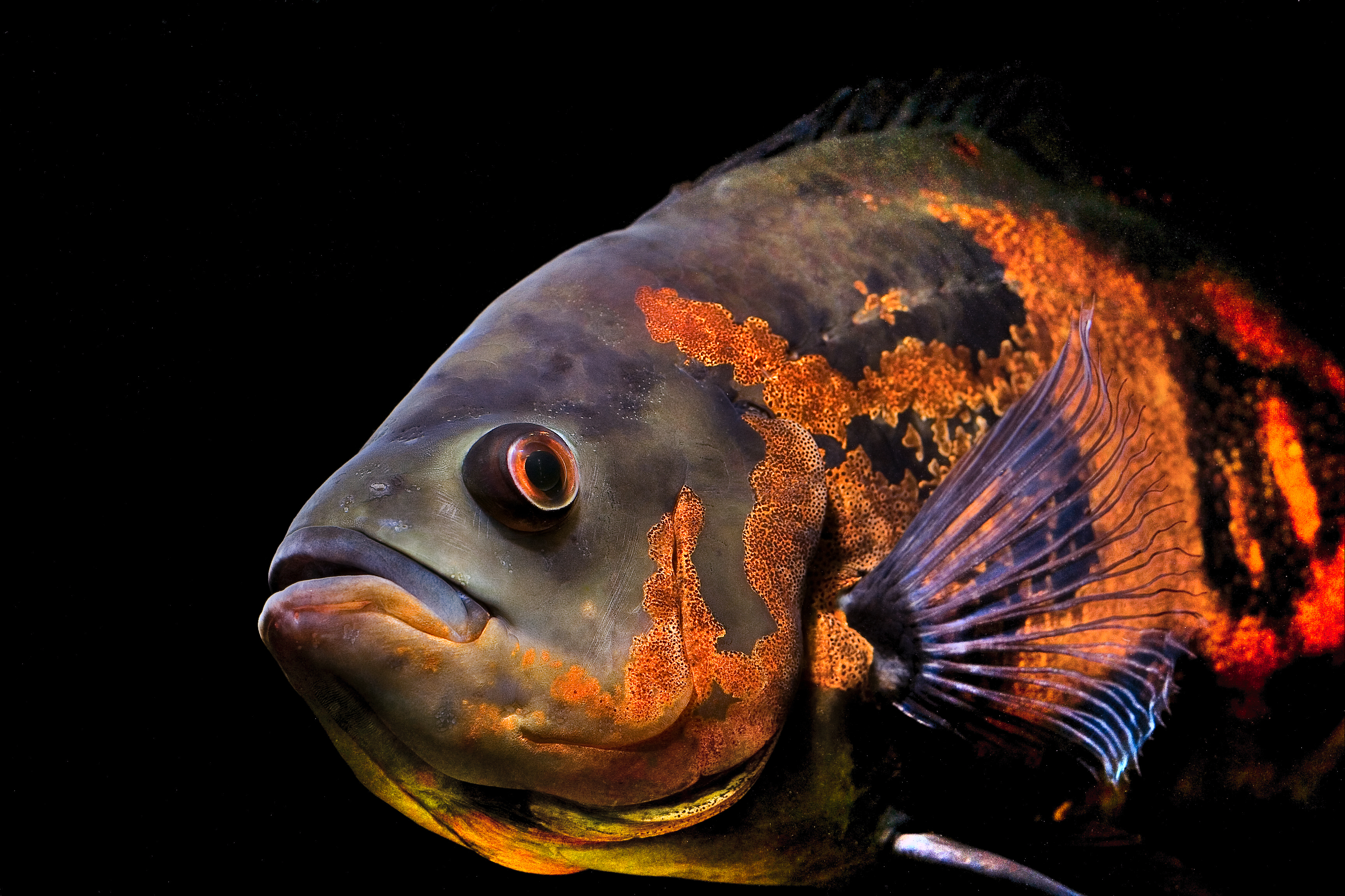
- Oscar (A. ocellatus)

Scientific classification
- Kingdom: Animalia
- Phylum: Chordata
- Class: Actinopterygii
- Order: Cichliformes
- Family: Cichlidae
- Subfamily: Cichlinae
- Tribe: Astronotini; Hoedeman, 1947
- Genus: Astronotus; Swainson, 1839

Type species
- Lobotes ocellatus Agassiz, 1831

= Astronotus =

Genus of fishes

Astronotus is a genus of South American fish from the family Cichlidae. There are three commonly recognized species in the genus (listed below), though genetic evidence suggests that additional species exist; several of these possibly distinct populations also have very different juvenile coloration from the three recognized species. Astronotus ocellatus and Astronotus crassipinnis are found in the Amazon Basin, while Astronotus crassipinnis is also found in the Paraná and Paraguay rivers. The third species (Astronotus mikoljii) is only found in the Orinoco River and Gulf of Paria basins in Venezuela and Colombia. Astronotus species grow to 35 cm in size, and are monomorphic. They are opportunistic omnivores and consume a range of smaller fish, fruits, nuts, crustaceans, mollusks and other invertebrates in the wild.

One species, the oscar (Astronotus ocellatus), is popular in the aquarium trade. A. ocellatus forms monogamous pairs which spawn in the open, typically on a flattened stone or in a shallow depression. The juvenile colouration is different from that of the adult and may aid in camouflage of the fry.

In contrast, Astronotus crassipinnis is seldom exported for the aquarium trade.

Astronotus mikoljii, differs from Astronotus crassipinnis and Astronotus ocellatus in pre-orbital depth, caudal peduncle depth, head width, and caudal peduncle length, with significant differences in average percentage values. Osteologically, it differs from the two described species by lacking a hypurapophysis on the parahypural bone (hypural complex) and having two or three supraneural bones.

In some classifications the Astronotus is the sole genus in the monogeneric tribe Astronotini of the subfamily Cichlinae.

== Species ==
There are currently three recognized species in this genus:

Image	Scientific name	Common name	Distribution
	Astronotus crassipinnis (Heckel, 1840)		southern Amazon basin and the Paraná–Paraguay basins.
	Astronotus ocellatus (Agassiz, 1831)	Oscar, velvet cichlid, and marble cichlid	Peru, Ecuador, Colombia, Brazil, and French Guiana, and occurs in the Amazon River basin, along the Amazon, Içá, Negro, Solimões, and Ucayali River systems
	Astronotus mikoljii Alfredo Perez Lozano, Oscar M. Lasso-Alcalá, Pedro S. Bittencourt, Taphorn, Nayibe Perez and Izeni Pires Farias. 2022	Mikolji’s Oscar	From the Orinoco River and Gulf of Paria Basins, northern South America
