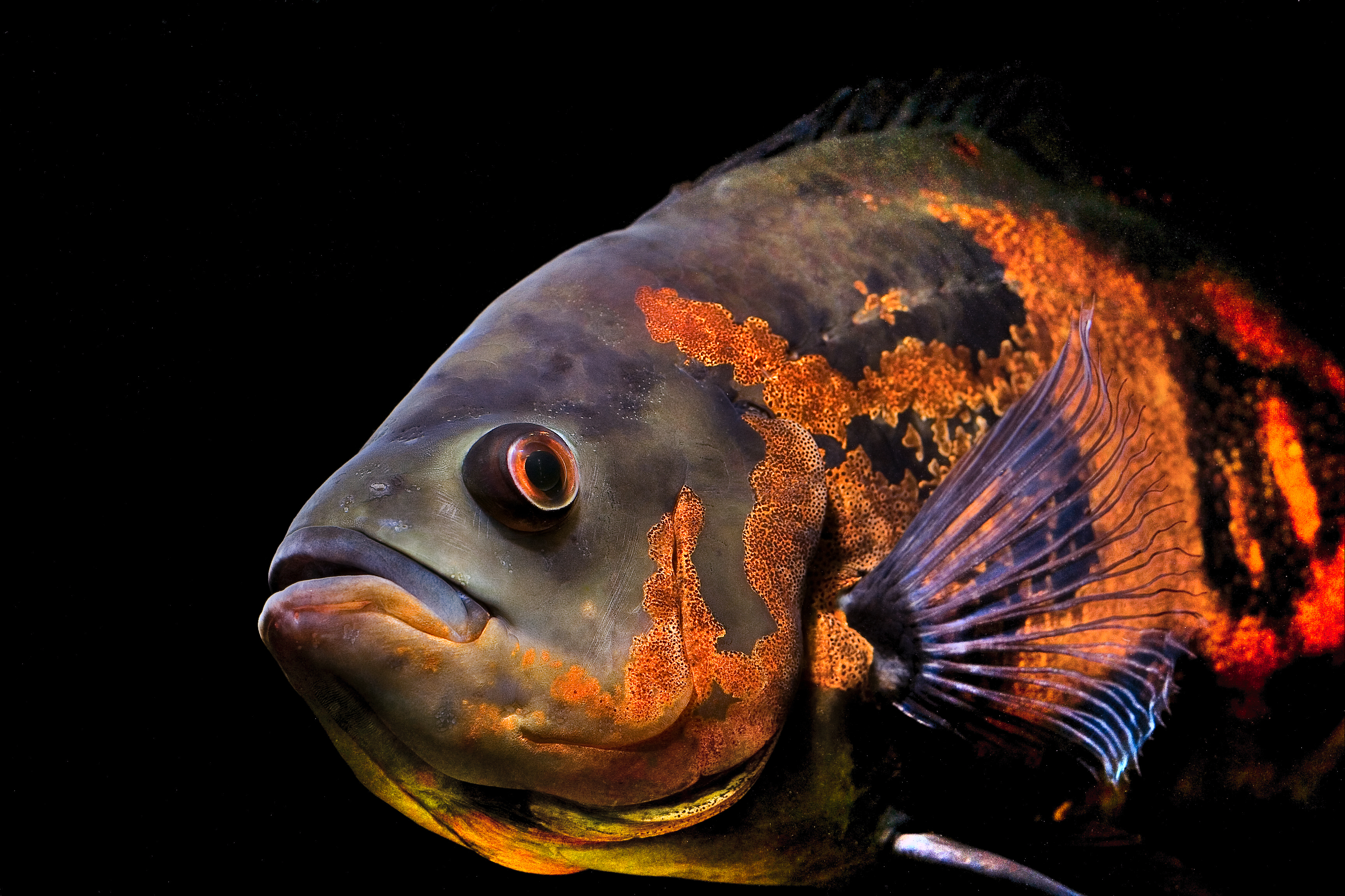

Conservation status
- Least Concern (IUCN 3.1)

Scientific classification
- Kingdom: Animalia
- Phylum: Chordata
- Class: Actinopterygii
- Division: Teleostei
- Order: Cichliformes
- Family: Cichlidae
- Genus: Astronotus
- Species: A. ocellatus

Binomial name
- Astronotus ocellatus (Agassiz, 1831)

= Oscar (fish) =

Oscar fish

Species of fish

The oscar (Astronotus ocellatus) is a species of fish from the cichlid family known under a variety of common names, including Tiger Oscar, Velvet Cichlid, and Marble Cichlid. In tropical South America, where the species naturally resides, A. ocellatus specimens are often found for sale as a food fish in the local markets. The fish has been introduced to other areas, including India, China, Australia, and the United States. It is considered a popular aquarium fish in Europe and the U.S.

== Taxonomy ==
The species was originally described by Louis Agassiz in 1831 as Lobotes ocellatus, as he mistakenly believed the species was marine; later work assigned the species to the genus Astronotus. The species also has a number of junior synonyms: Acara compressus, Acara hyposticta, Astronotus ocellatus zebra, and Astronotus orbiculatus.

== Description ==
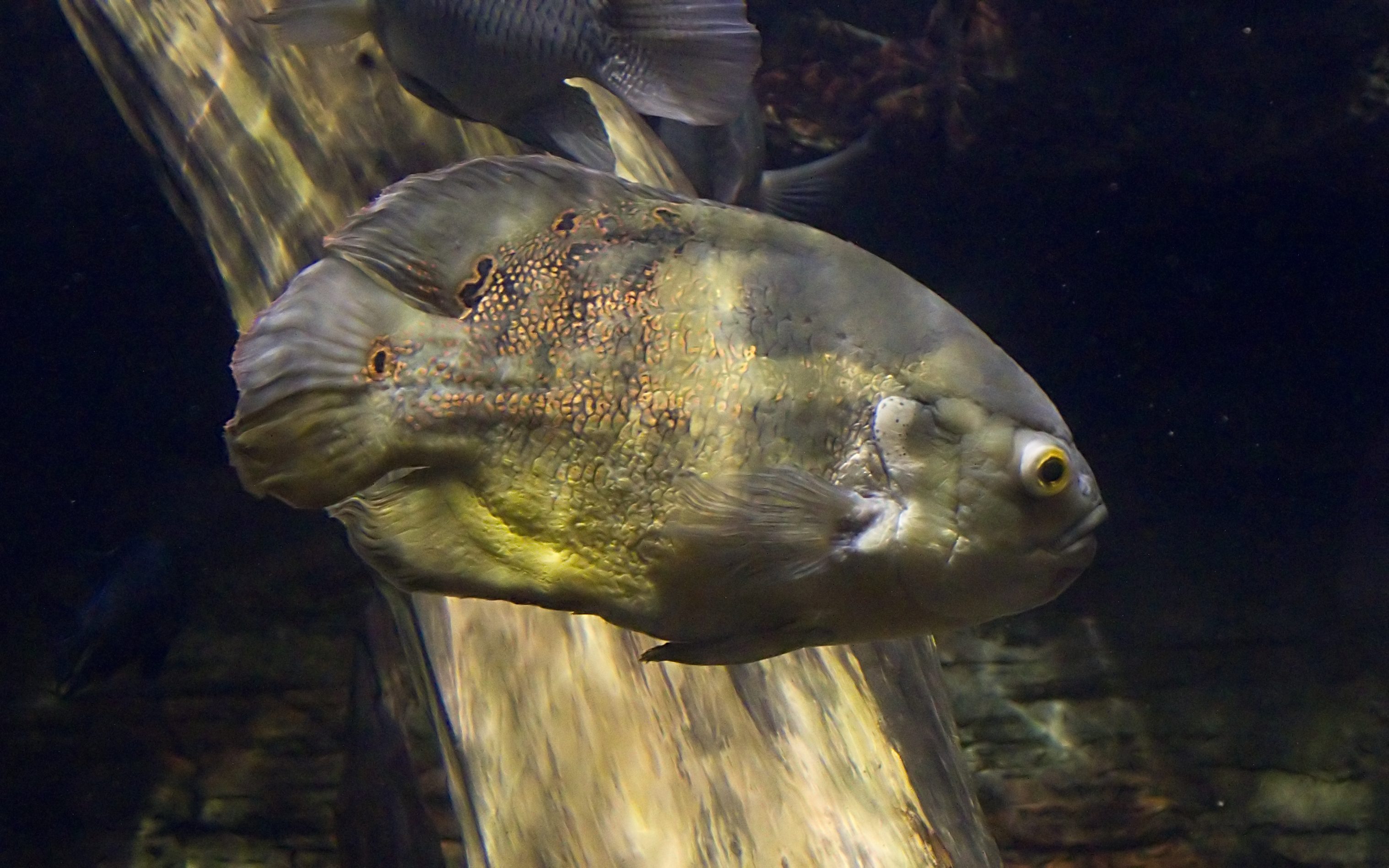
Ocelli on dorsal fin and caudal peduncle

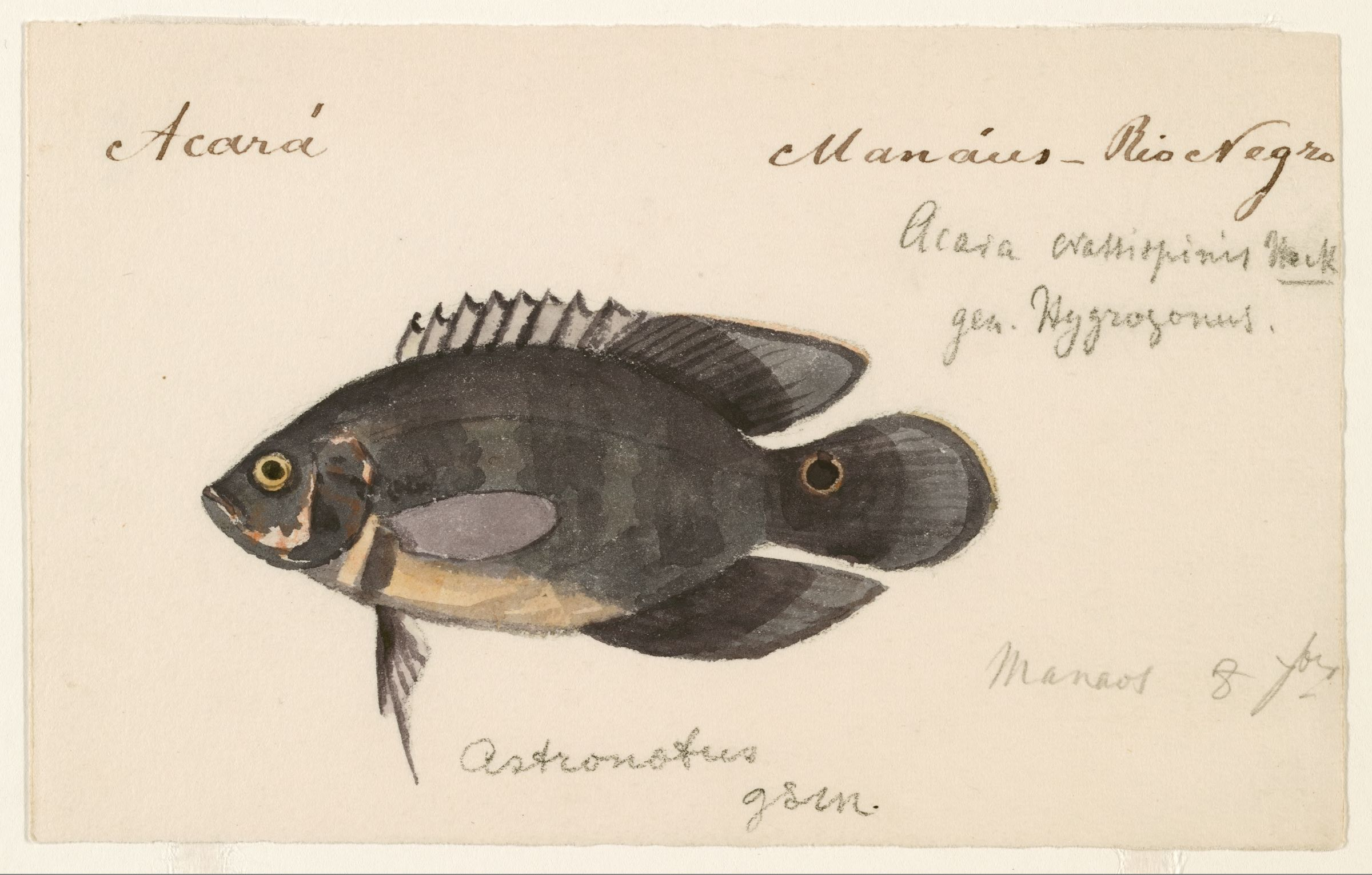
1831 watercolor of Astronotus ocellatus by Jacques Burkhardt.

A. ocellatus examples have been reported to grow to about 70 cm (28 in) in length and 9 kilograms (20 lb) in weight. The wild-caught forms of the species are typically darkly coloured with yellow-ringed spots or ocelli on the caudal peduncle and on the dorsal fin. These ocelli have been suggested to function to limit fin-nipping by piranha (Serrasalmus spp.), which co-occur with A. ocellatus in its natural environment. The species is also able to rapidly alter its colouration, a trait which facilitates ritualised territorial and combat behaviours amongst conspecifics. Juvenile oscars have a different colouration from adults, and are striped with white and orange wavy bands and have spotted heads.

== Distribution and habitat ==
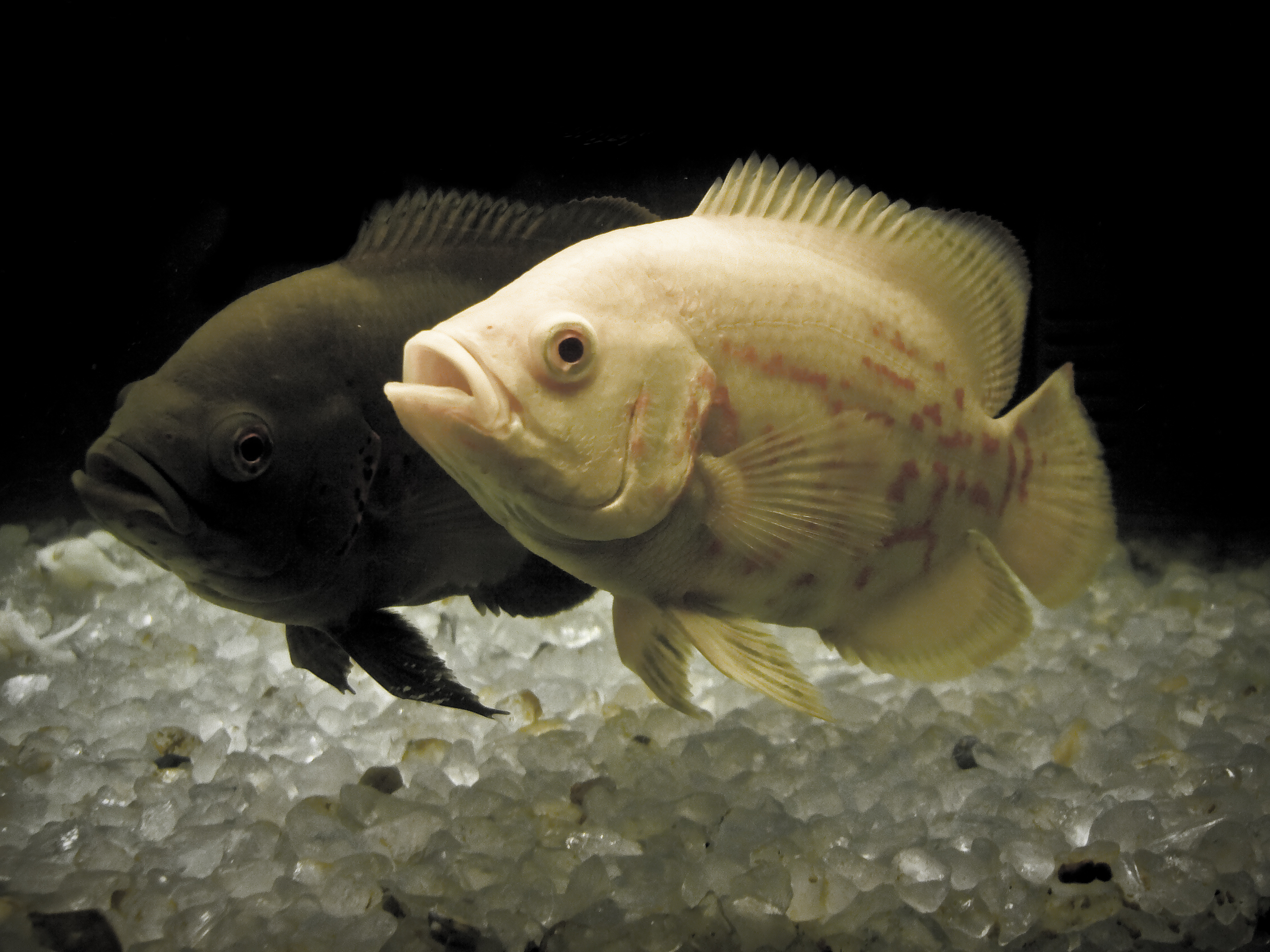
Two tiger oscars

A. ocellatus is native to Brazil, Colombia, Ecuador, Guyana, French Guiana, Suriname, Peru, and Venezuela, and occurs in the Amazon River basin, along the Amazon, Içá, Negro, Solimões, and Ucayali River systems, and also in the Approuague and Oyapock River drainages. In its natural environment, the species typically occurs in slow-moving white-water habitats, and has been observed sheltering under submerged branches. Feral populations also occur in China, northern Australia, and Florida, USA as a byproduct of the ornamental fish trade. The species is limited in its distribution by its intolerance of cooler water temperatures, the lower lethal limit for the species is 12.9 °C (55.22 °F).

== Reproduction ==
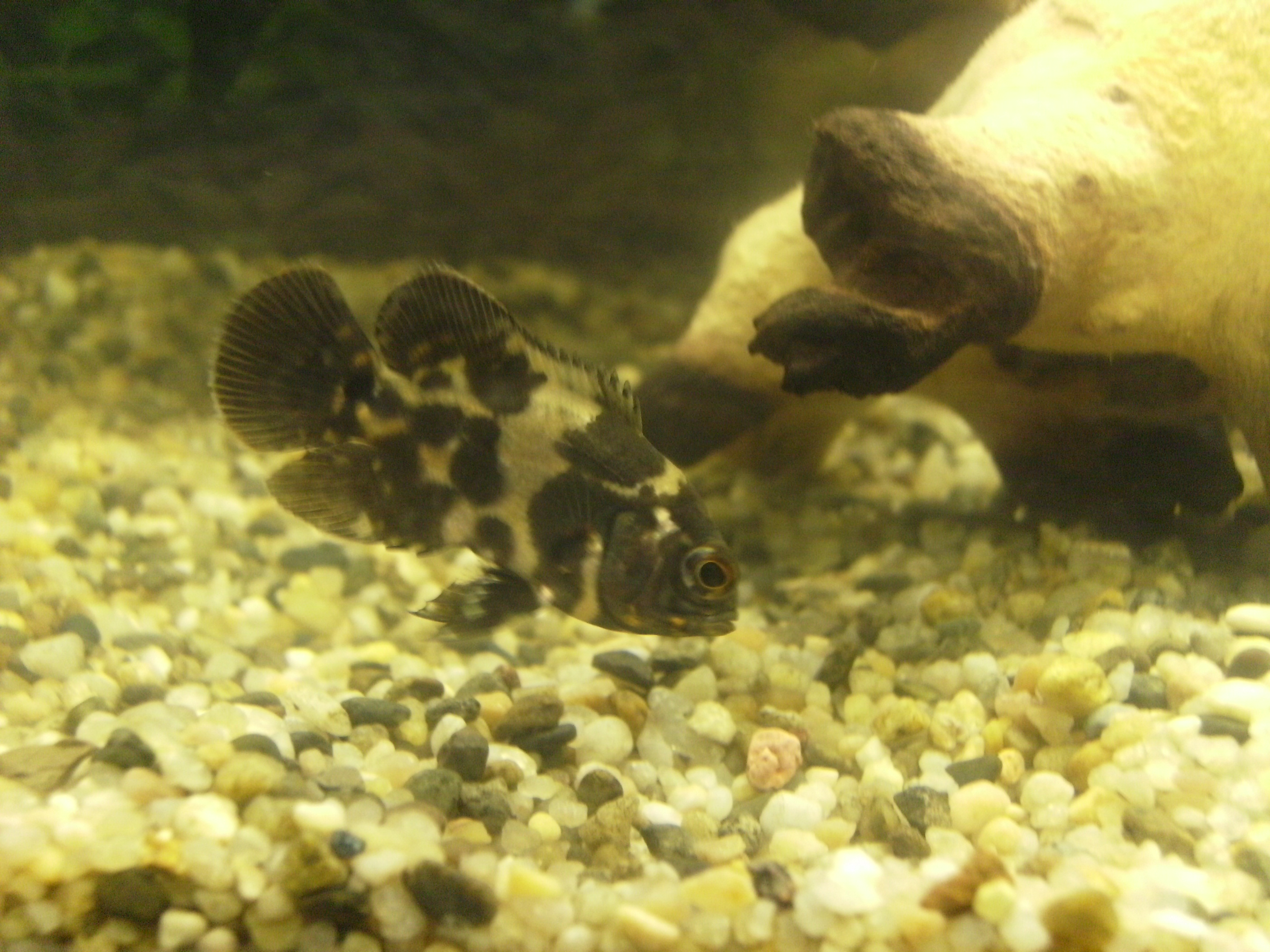
Young Oscar, about 2 in

Although the species is widely regarded as sexually monomorphic, males have been suggested to grow more quickly, and in some naturally occurring strains, males are noted to possess dark blotches on the base of their dorsal fins. The species reaches sexual maturity around one year of age, and continues to reproduce for 9–10 years. Frequency and timing of spawning may be related to the occurrence of rain. A. ocellatus fish are biparental substrate spawners, though detailed information regarding their reproduction in the wild is scarce.

In captivity, pairs are known to select and clean generally flattened horizontal or vertical surfaces on which to lay their eggs. Smaller females lay around 300–500 eggs, while larger female oscars can lay about 2,500-3,000 eggs. Like most cichlids, A. ocellatus practices brood care, although the duration of brood care in the wild remains unknown.

== In the aquarium ==
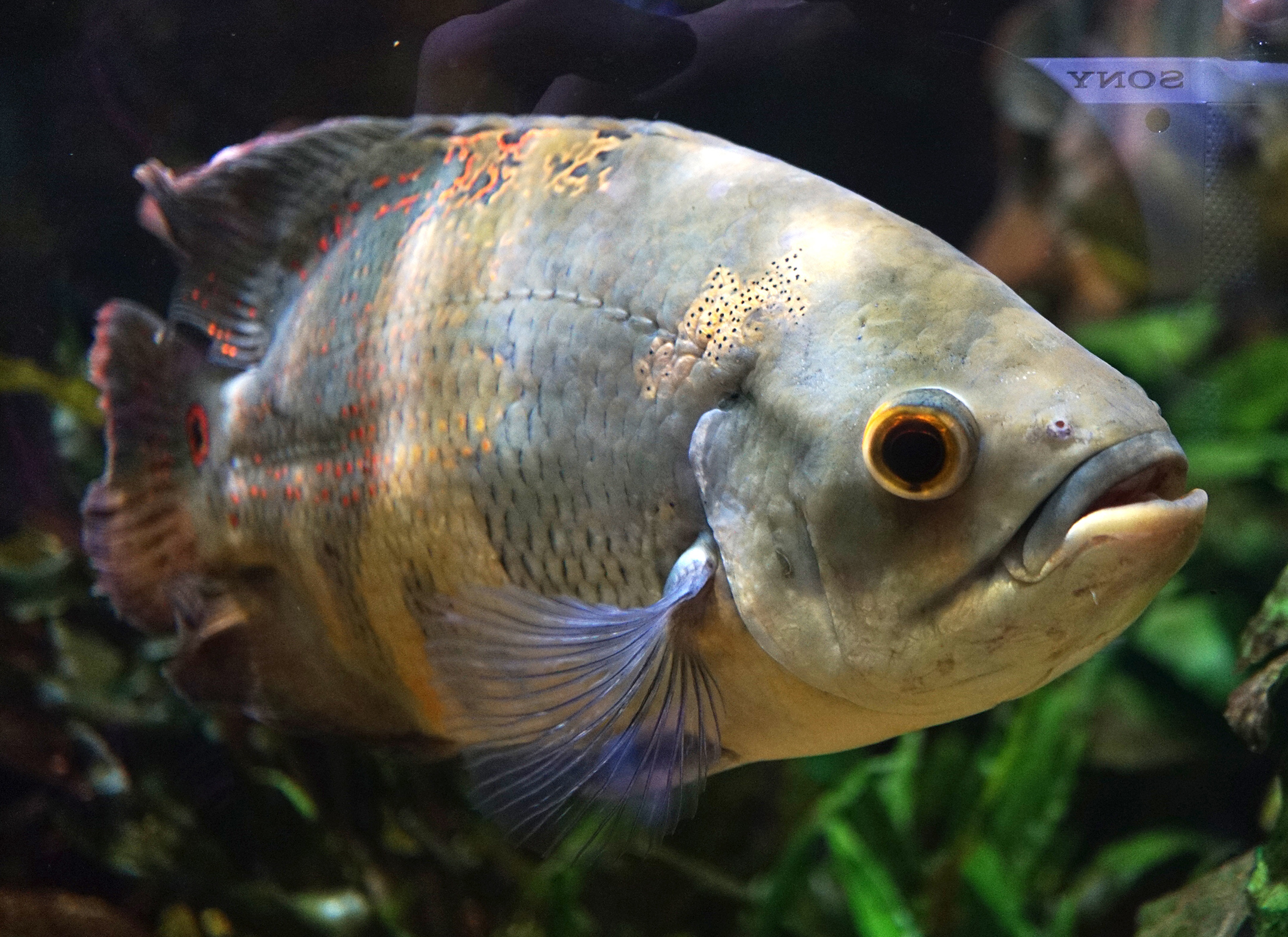
The oscar at the Särkänniemi Aquarium in Tampere, Finland

Oscar fish can live in the aquarium with almost any type of fish around the same size as it gets.

=== Food ===
Oscar fish are omnivores. Most fish eaten by A. ocellatus in the wild are relatively sedentary catfish, including Bunocephalus, Rineloricaria, and Ochmacanthus species. The species uses a suction mechanism to capture prey, and has been reported to exhibit "lying-on-side" death mimicry in a similar fashion to Parachromis friedrichsthalii and Nimbochromis livingstonii. Wild oscars also consume shrimp, snails, insects and insect larvae, as well as fruits and nuts on a seasonal basis. The species also has an absolute requirement for vitamin C, and develops health problems in its absence.Captive oscars generally eat fish food designed for large carnivorous fish: crayfish, worms, and insects (such as flies, crickets and grasshoppers).

=== Territorial behavior ===
An albino oscar

Oscars will often lay claim to an area of the aquarium and will be very aggressive towards other fish encroaching on their newly established territory inside the aquarium or lake. The size of the territory varies depending on the size and aggressiveness of the fish, and its surroundings. Once the oscar establishes a territory, it will vigorously defend it by chasing away other fish.

=== Varieties ===
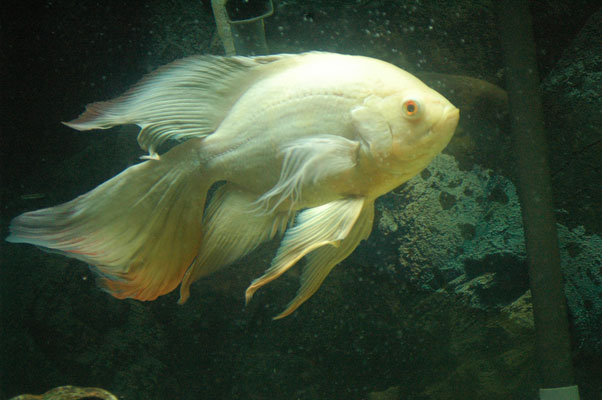
A leucistic long-finned oscar

A number of ornamental varieties of A. ocellatus have been developed for the aquarium industry. These include forms with greater intensity and quantities of red marbling across the body, albino, leucistic, and xanthistic forms. A. ocellatus with marbled patches of red pigmentation are sold as red tiger oscars, while those strains with the mainly red colouration of the flanks are frequently sold under the trade name of red oscars. The patterning of red pigment differs between individuals. In recent years long-finned varieties have also been developed. The species is also occasionally artificially coloured by a process known as painting.
