= Collyweston Great Wood and Easton Hornstocks =

Protected area in Northamptonshire, England

Coordinates: 52.594°N 0.507°W

- Site of Special Scientific Interest
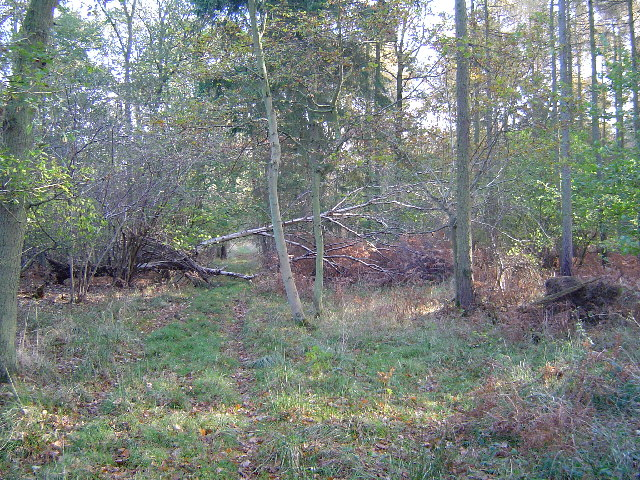
- Location of Collyweston Great Wood and Easton Hornstocks.
- Area of search: Northamptonshire
- Grid reference: TF 012 006
- Interest: Biological
- Area: 151.5 hectares
- Notification date: 1984
- Location map: Magic Map

Collyweston Great Wood and Easton Hornstocks is a 151.5-hectare (374-acre) biological Site of Special Scientific Interest north of King's Cliffe in Northamptonshire. The site is a National Nature Reserve and a Nature Conservation Review site, Grade I. The site is 14 kilometres (8.7 miles) west of Peterborough and the nearest villages are Collyweston, which is 1 kilometre (0.62 miles) north west of the site, and Duddington which is a similar distance to the west.

== Wildlife ==
These woods have ash, lime and sessile oak, together with wild service-tree, which is an indicator of ancient woodland. The ground flora is very rich, including locally unusual plants such as lily-of-the-valley, wood spurge, great wood-rush, violet helleborine and columbine. Animals found in the woods include slowworm, red kite, common buzzard, lesser spotted woodpecker and great spotted woodpecker.

Historically these woods were once part of Rockingham Forest. and they were continuous with Bedford Purlieus woodland until the mid 19th century. An area of the centre of Easton Hornstocks was quarried and an area within Collyweston Great Wood was deforested to build RAF Collyweston.

A permit from Natural England is required for access.

== Archaeology ==
In the Autumn of 1953 a large Roman site was uncovered by contractors at the old Royal Air Force bomb site located in Collyweston Wood. Large quantities of stone and pottery were reported and a small scale excavation was undertaken which revealed a corner of a rectangular building. After this the chief inspector of ancient monuments was informed and excavations commenced in October 1953 for a month. These revealed a remarkable complex of buildings, a group of dry-stone walled buildings, which included two rectangular buildings, a circular building, an octagonal building and a hexagonal building. These were determined to be the remains of a number of temples and their ancillary buildings. In addition, a large amount of pottery, including a large bowl with a dolphin pattern and others with sea horse decorations were found. These are known to be of local origin. The archaeologists also found jewellery including beautifully decorated brooches and pins. The pottery discovered was found to come from the 1st to the early 4th centuries of the common era.
