= Listed buildings in Oakley, Bedfordshire =

Oakley is a civil parish in Bedford, Bedfordshire, England. It contains 22 listed buildings that are recorded in the National Heritage List for England. Of these, one is listed at Grade I, the highest of the three grades, one is listed at Grade II*, the middle grade, and the others are at Grade II, the lowest grade.

== Key ==
Grade	Criteria
I	Buildings of exceptional interest, sometimes considered to be internationally important
II*	Particularly important buildings of more than special interest
II	Buildings of national importance and special interest

== Buildings ==
Name and location	Photograph	Date	Notes	Grade
Rectory Cottage; 52.16542°N 0.52410°W	—	16th century	A timber framed rectory of two storeys, with the gable ends being rendered over. The house was extended in the 20th century, including: a flat roofed conservatory covering the right hand ground floor window, an additional gabled wing to the right hand side, and a central porch.	II
29, Church Lane; 52.16942°N 0.52725°W		1854	The house is constructed from coursed limestone rubble with a clay tile roof over the single storey. There rubble chimney stacks with ashlar quoins, and the main block has a centrally projecting gabled wing, with a gabled porch to the left.	II
The Mallows, (Part of Former Oakley House Stables); 52.16705°N 0.53127°W	—	18th century	An 18th century, single storey cottage of coursed limestone rubble walls and a half-hipped concrete tile roof. The house was formerly part of the stables for Oakley House.	II
Outbuilding and Wall 10 Metres West of Middle Farm; 52.17346°N 0.52501°W	—	Late 18th to early 19th century	The barn consists of coursed limestone rubble with a clay tile roof, the wall continues to the east, and the building itself backs onto a footpath.	II
The Bedford Arms; 52.17105°N 0.52854°W		18th century	The main building is of 18th century origin, however there are numerous attached single storey outbuildings, and a 19th century extension to the rear elevation. The main block consists of two storeys of coursed limestone rubble, with an old clay tile roof. The outbuildings are also of coursed limestone rubble, whilst the rear extension is of colour washed brick, and all are topped with Welsh slate roofs.	II
Queen's College Farmhouse; 52.17274°N 0.52670°W	—	17th century	17th century coursed limestone rubble farmhouse with an old clay tile roof. The building is arranged in an T-plan, with the main block of two storeys, and the rear projecting wing of a single storey.	II
Barn 35 Metres to North West of College Farmhouse; 52.16513°N 0.52271°W	—	18th century	The barn is of a coursed limestone rubble construction with a half-hipped old clay tile roof, and laid out in an L-plan.	II
Goods Shed at Former Oakley Railway Station; 52.17269°N 0.51927°W	—	1857	Red brick goods shed with polychrome dressings, topped with slate roofs with modillion brick eaves. It is one storey tall with two full height archways, and three arched recesses with gouged brick heads.	II
Yew Tree House; 52.17005°N 0.53386°W	—	1862	The house is of a coursed limestone rubble construction with ashlar quoins, and a clay tile roof with bracketed stone eaves. The building is of one storey, and there is a small wing projecting from the rear elevation.	II
St Mary's Cottage; 52.16590°N 0.52477°W	—	Early 17th century	A timber framed cottage that was later pebbledashed in the 19th century. An olf clay tile roof covers the single storey, and the building is in a T-plan with the cross-wing on the right hand side. There is a lean-to porch in the angle of the wings, and a further Victorian gault brick lean-to at the west end. Inside, the house retains a fireplace of limestone and Totternhoe clunch.	II
Church of St Mary; 52.16573°N 0.52383°W		12th century	The parish church is constructed from coursed limestone rubble and an old clay tile roof. The base of the west tower and the western end of the nave date to the 12th century, with alterations and additions since. Inside, the north chapel has a painted screen depicting Christ sat on a rainbow, along with a complete set of buttressed pews.	I
The Little House; 52.16905°N 0.52833°W	—	1857	The house is dated to 1857 and consists of a single storey constructed from coursed limestone rubble with ashlar dressings. The roof is of red and purple patterned tile with crested ridge tiles.	II
Grooms Cottage (Part of Former Oakley House Stables); 52.16723°N 0.53152°W	—	Late 18th to early 19th century	Formerly part of the stables to Oakley House, alongside The Mallows. It is constructed from coursed limestone rubble, and the single storey is topped with an old clay tile roof.	II
26 and 28, High Street; 52.17386°N 0.52492°W	—	1905	A pair of single storey houses, consisting of red brick banded with purples bricks, and a steeply pitched clay tile roof that sweeps out at the eaves level over the ground floor. The building has a plaque mounted declaring that the houses were presented by Herbrand Russell, 11th Duke of Bedford to the Bedfordshire and Hertfordshire Regiment.	II
Old School House; 52.16702°N 0.52222°W	—	Late 19th century	The building is formerly a school and school house, and now functions as a community centre. The school room itself is one storey tall, a further one storey gabled wing projects from the left hand side which formed the school house. The budling is of coursed limestone rubble with ashlar dressings and an old clay tile roof with bracketed eaves.	II
27-33, Station Road; 52.17394°N 0.52072°W	—	1865	A terrace of two storey Bedford Estate cottages of coursed limestone rubble with yellow brick dressings. The building has a hipped clay tile roof with dental eaves. The east plan has s slightly projecting end wings, alongside a large central wing.	II
Coal Offices at Former Oakley Railway Station; 52.17281°N 0.51953°W	—	c1857	Former coal offices for the now-demolished railway station that are now in use with a private business. They are constructed of red brick with polychrome red and yellow brick dressings, and a welsh slate roof with modillion brick eaves.	II
Reynes Cottage; 52.16881°N 0.52813°W	—	Mid-19th century	Cottage of coursed limestone rubble construction with an old clay tile roof over the two storeys. There is a projecting chimney stack of stone with ashlar quoins on the left hand side, and attached to the west gable end is a single storey outbuilding.	II
Middle Farmhouse; 52.17357°N 0.52465°W	—	Late 17th to early 18th century	The farmhouse has an additional main range added to the south end in the early 19th century. The entire building is a coursed limestone rubble construction underneath an old clay tile roof. The original main block is of two storeys and the gable end faces the road, whilst there is a projecting single storey gabled wing to the left hand side.	II
Oakley Bridge; 52.16517°N 0.52730°W		Early 19th century	An early 19th century bridge that crosses the River Great Ouse. It consists of five semi-circular arches of coursed limestone rubble.	II
Maze Cottage; 52.16880°N 0.52826°W	—	Late 18th to early 19th century	The cottage is constructed from coulour washed brick and has an old clay tile roof. It was originally laid out in a two storey L-plan, however there was a single storey wing added to the rear in the 20th century. It is thought that the building originally served as the lodge to Oakley House, it is named after a previously existing maze adjacent to the property.	II
Oakley House; 52.16819°N 0.53255°W	—	c1795	The house was designed by Henry Holland as a hunting lodge for Francis Russell, 5th Duke of Bedford. It consists of two storeys of party colour washed coursed limestone rubble, and the roofs are hipped and of slate. The west, south, and east elevations of the building has a verandah on the ground floor, and the north elevation has a pair of colour washed two storey projecting wings forming a courtyard. Inside, the doorways in the hall are imported from Fineshade Abbey.	II*
