= Collyweston Slate Mine =

Slate mine in Northamptonshire, England

Collyweston Stone Slate Mine.
- Site of Special Scientific Interest
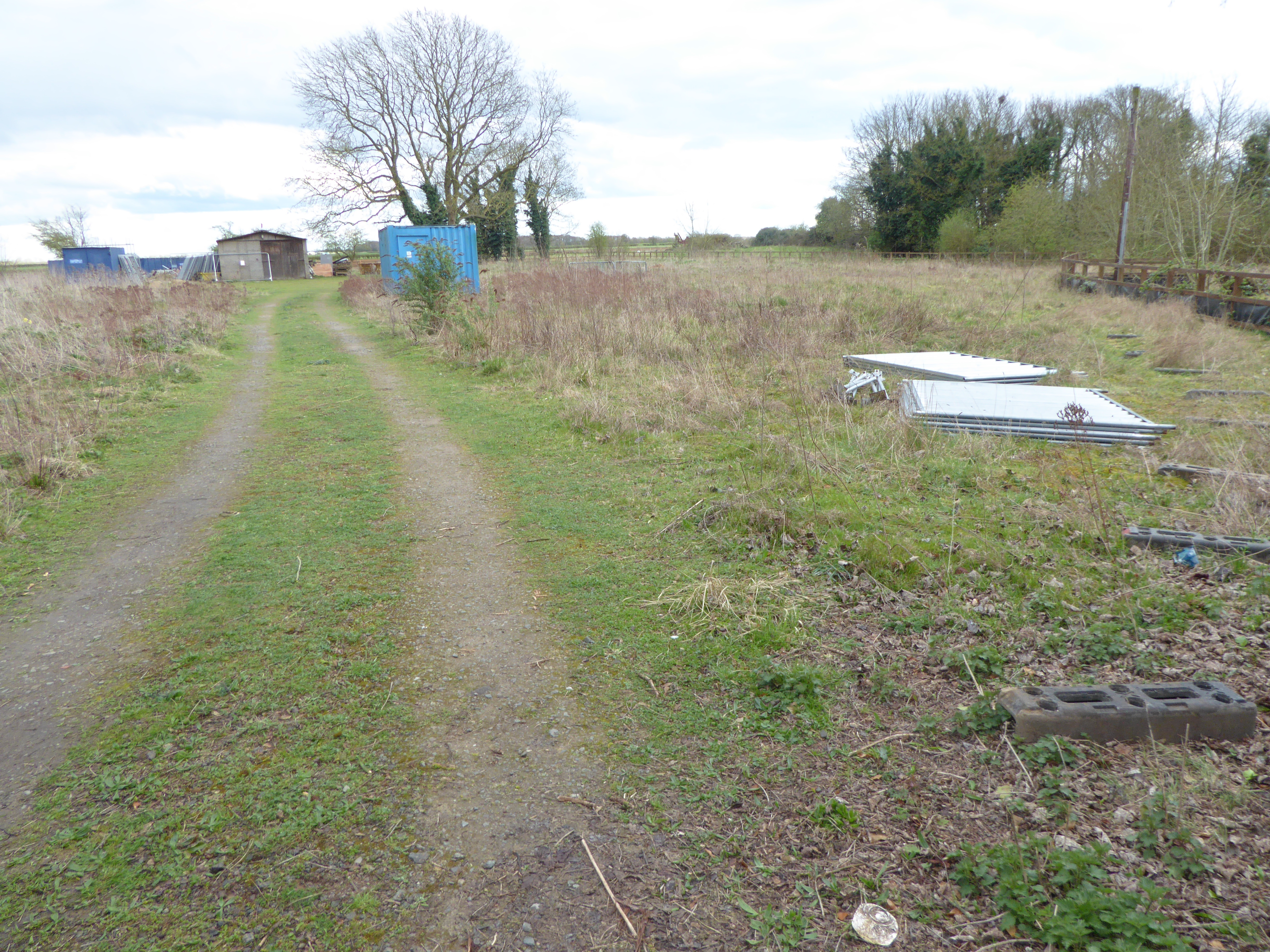
- Location of Collyweston Stone Slate Mine..
- Area of search: Northamptonshire
- Grid reference: TF 000 030
- Coordinates: 52.616°N 0.524°W
- Interest: Geological
- Area: 0.9 hectares
- Notification date: 1984
- Location map: Magic Map

The Collyweston Stone Slate Mine is a geological Site of Special Scientific Interest (SSSI) and a Geological Conservation Review site north-west of Collyweston in Northamptonshire in England. It is the Type locality for Collyweston stone slate.

Collyweston Stone Slate is a type of limestone slate found at sites in Northamptonshire. It has been used for roofing across the East Midlands since Roman time. While the original mine is now closed and designated an SSSI, slate extraction continues at a nearby operational mine.

== Geological site and SSSI ==
The Collyweston Stone Slate Mine is a 0.9-hectare (2.2-acre) geological Site of Special Scientific Interest (SSSI) and a Geological Conservation Review site in Northamptonshire. This site operated until 1963, quarrying Collyweston slate which dates to the Jurassic period. The shaft exposes a section described by Natural England as "stratigraphically important" and serves as the type locality for the slate.

The SSSI remains private land and is the location of the Collyweston Heritage Centre, home to a permanent exhibition of the art of Collyweston stone slating, which is accessible by appointment.

The Collyweston stone slate geological seam extends beyond the boundaries of the SSSI, and slate extraction continues nearby at the only operational Collyweston Stone Slate Mine (Grid Reference TF 000 033).

Location of the operational Collyweston Stone Slate Mine

== Geology and traditional extraction ==
Collyweston stone slate is a sedimentary limestone from the Jurassic Period, approximately 140-190 million years old. Although it is not a metamorphic slate, it is fissile and splits along planes into sheets.

The material takes its name from the village of Collyweston and has been used for roofing across the East Midlands and further afield since Roman times. In the 17th century, it was used extensively in Stamford as a fire-resistant alternative to thatch. From the Middle Ages until the 19th century, the slate was used on most buildings within the local area of the quarries, as well as prestigious structures such as Kings, Clare and Christ's Colleges, Cambridge University.

Traditionally, quarrying took place only during December and January when the rock could be laid out to allow the winter frosts to reveal layers that could be broken or "clived" into flat slates suitable for roofing. This production method was both labour intensive and time consuming.

By the early 20th century, the industry was in decline partly for economic reasons and the availability of cheaper alternatives and reclaimed slate, but also because of a number of mild winters that prevented the frosting process.

== Modern operations ==
An application to re-open Collyweston Slate Mine was approved in June 2015. To address a shortage of reclaimed slate, the mine was reopened in 2016 by Claude N Smith Ltd, a family-run business, to ensure a sustainable supply of the material. The reopening was supported by research into the "freeze-thaw cycle" conducted by Sheffield Hallam University and English Heritage (now Historic England), which developed an artificial system to mimic the natural splitting process using freezer technology.

This artificial cooling process is now utilised at the mine via refrigerated steel containers, allowing for production throughout the year regardless of weather conditions. Mechanised extraction has also been introduced, utilising a Brokk 100 robot to mine limestone logs, reducing the production time from several months to approximately one week.

== Notable applications ==
Collyweston stone slates have been used in the restoration of several high-profile buildings:

- The Guildhall, London: The largest single Collyweston roof, which was re-slated in ten phases during the 1990s by Claude N Smith Ltd.
- University of Cambridge: The material was used for the restoration of Bodley’s Court at King's College (beginning in 2018), as well as the Old Court Christ's College and the Old Court Clare College.
- Old Westbury Gardens Mansion, Long Island, New York: This mansion is believed to feature the only roof in the United States composed of Collyweston slate. The restoration involved the shipment of approximately 500 square metres of stone to the US and the installation by a team of specialist roofers.
