= Collyweston Quarries =

Protected area in Northamptonshire, England

Coordinates: 52.623°N 0.519°W

- Site of Special Scientific Interest
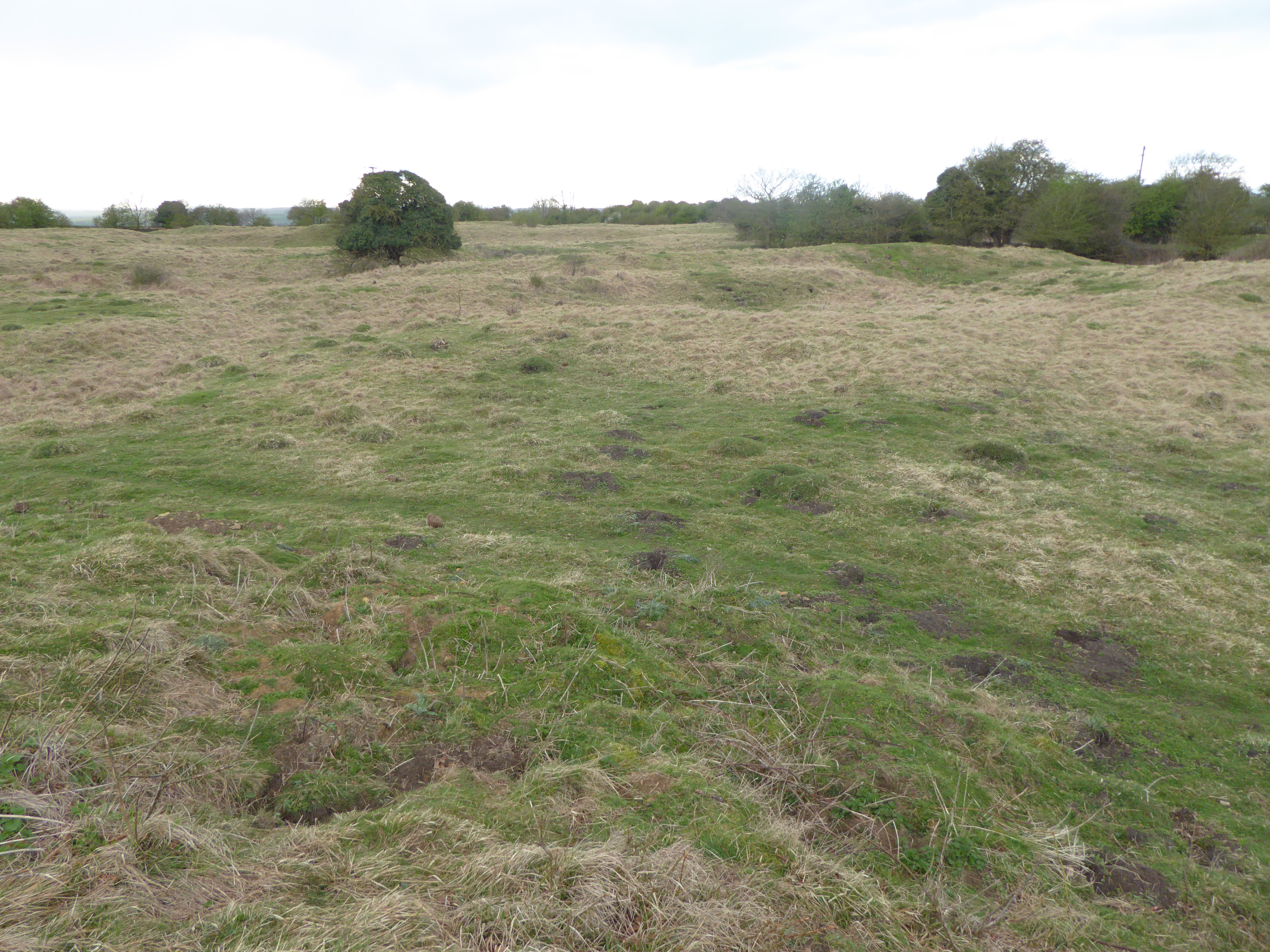
- Location of Collyweston Quarries.
- Area of search: Northamptonshire
- Grid reference: TF 003 038
- Interest: Biological
- Area: 6.6 hectares
- Notification date: 1983
- Location map: Magic Map

The Collyweston Quarries are a 6.6-hectare (16-acre) biological Site of Special Scientific Interest located near the village of Collyweston in Northamptonshire, England. They are known for producing the distinctive Collyweston stone slate, a traditional roofing material that has played a significant role in the region’s architectural heritage. In recent years, the quarries have evolved into vibrant ecological sites with a variety of flora and fauna.

== History ==
=== Origins and early use ===
Collyweston stone slate is a sedimentary limestone from the Jurassic period, approximately 140–190 million years old. Unlike metamorphic slate, this limestone naturally splits along its bedding planes, making it suitable for roofing. The material is named after the village of Collyweston, situated centrally within the quarrying area. Its use as a roofing material dates back to Roman times, with archaeological excavations revealing hexagonal slates with single peg holes at sites such as Great Casterton and Godmanchester.

=== Medieval expansion ===
During the medieval period, the demand for Collyweston stone slate increased significantly. It became the predominant roofing material within 10 square miles (26 km^{2}) of the quarries and was also employed in prestigious buildings further afield. The labor-intensive process of extracting and preparing the slate involved quarrying the stone during winter months, as natural frost action was essential for splitting the stone into usable slates.

=== Industrial decline and revival ===
The production of Collyweston stone slate peaked in the late 1800s but declined by the 1970s due to commercial unviability. Traditional methods relied on natural frost action to split the stone, a process that became less reliable with changing climatic conditions. However, efforts to preserve the heritage of Collyweston stone slate have led to the reopening of a slate mine in the village by Claude N Smith Ltd in 2016, after its closure in the 1960s. Advancements by Sheffield Hallam University and Historic England have enabled the revival of traditional slate production methods.

== Ecological transformation ==
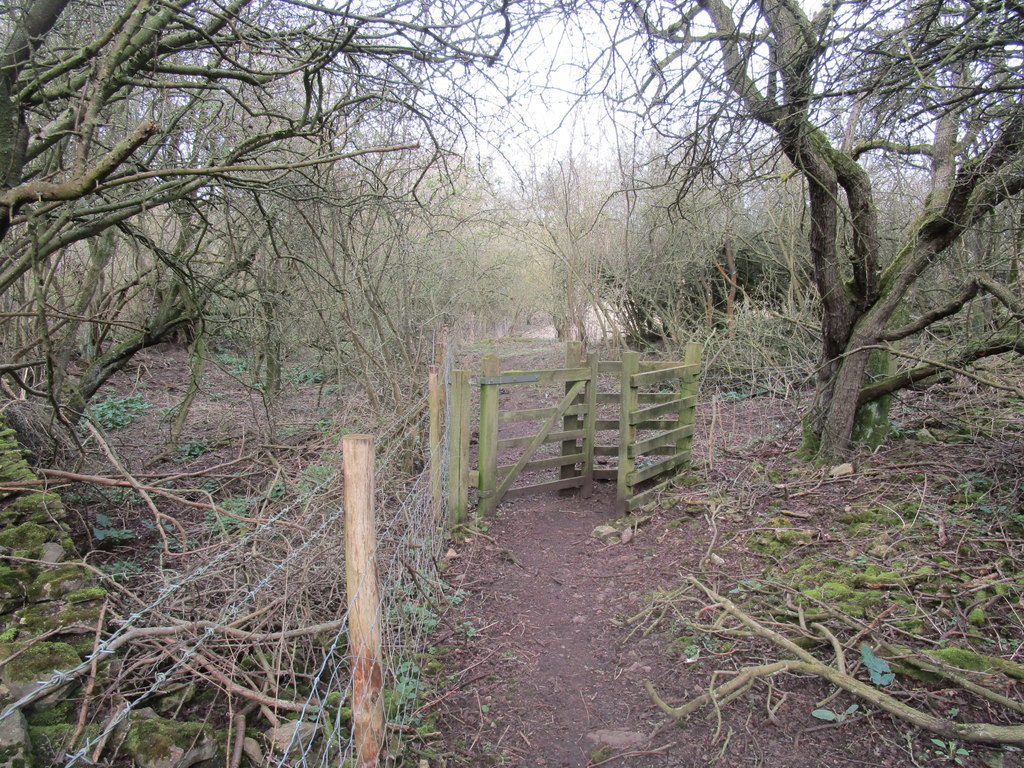
Entrance to the Collyweston Quarries Nature Reserve.

Following the decline of quarrying activities, Collyweston Quarries underwent a natural transformation. The main quarry has been repurposed into a nature reserve managed by the Wildlife Trust for Bedfordshire, Cambridgeshire, and Northamptonshire. This 6.6-hectare site, designated as a Site of Special Scientific Interest (SSSI), features rough grassland on Jurassic limestone, supporting a diverse array of flora and fauna. Over a hundred flowering plant species have been recorded, including wild thyme, dropwort, dyer's greenweed and clustered bellflower. There is a substantial butterfly population.
