= Interview between Elizabeth I and Mary, Queen of Scots =

An interview between Elizabeth I and Mary, Queen of Scots was planned to take place at Nottingham in England in September 1562. Despite diplomatic negotiation and detailed planning the meeting did not take place. There would have been theatrical entertainments celebrating the amity of England and Scotland.

== Background ==
There had been plans for Mary's father James V and Henry VIII to meet from December 1534 onwards. Scotland was traditionally allied with France and remained a Catholic country while there had been a Protestant Reformation in England. James Learmonth of Dairsie, master of James V's household, was prominent in the negotiations. James V preferred to meet at Newcastle or York rather than London, and was understood to be reluctant to come to England in 1542 while his wife, Mary of Guise, was pregnant. The breakdown of arrangements for a meeting at York was claimed to have led to the battles of Haddon Rig and Solway Moss in 1542.

Mary, Queen of Scots, returned to Scotland from France in August 1561. Elizabeth I was preoccupied with the terms of the 1560 treaty of Edinburgh, and sent Peter Meutas to ask for Mary's ratification. Issues about the treaty and its implications for the English succession might have been settled following a meeting in person. Mary told the English diplomat Thomas Randolph that she would like to meet Elizabeth I, saying that "above all other things, I do desire to see and speak with her". William Cecil was positive about the idea in December, but cautioned the diplomat Nicholas Throckmorton of the danger to be "any singular doer therein". By January 1562, a meeting of the two Queens regularly features in diplomatic correspondence.

There were rumours that Nicholas Throckmorton was an enthusiastic advocate for the interview and the prospect of Mary as Elizabeth's heir, influenced by gifts of silver plate which he had received from Mary. His son Arthur's will mentions a silver gilt cup which Mary had given to Nicholas Throckmorton in France.

Preliminary discussions for a meeting of Mary and Elizabeth in 1562 included an exchange of diamond rings. Mary sent verses with her gift, and the English bishop John Jewel sent copies to his friend Henry Bullinger. The Bishop was sceptical of Mary's diplomatic overtures and the plans for a meeting of the two queens, and attributed Mary's part in the initiative to her uncle François, Duke of Guise. Bishop Jewel also sent the verses to Josias Simmler, commenting on Mary's statecraft with a quotation, "He who knows not how to dissemble, knows not how to govern".

In Edinburgh, Thomas Randolph canvassed opinions about "th'intrevew" or "solemn meeting". He heard that the meeting might "repair the dishonour" of James V not coming to York with new "affiance and trust". Mary's secretary William Maitland of Lethington had been an advocate for the interview, and he began to make arrangements in London. Maitland brought Elizabeth's picture, possibly a portrait miniature, to Mary at Dunfermline Palace or Holyroodhouse in July 1562. Randolph said that although Mary wanted to limit numbers, many Scottish courtiers wanted to see Elizabeth and were glad to behold her picture.

== Discussions in 1562 ==
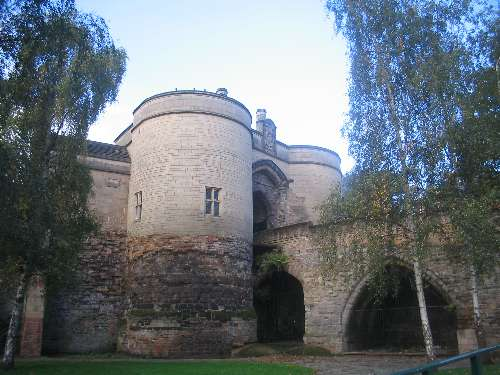
Nottingham Castle would have been the venue for the 1562 meeting of queens

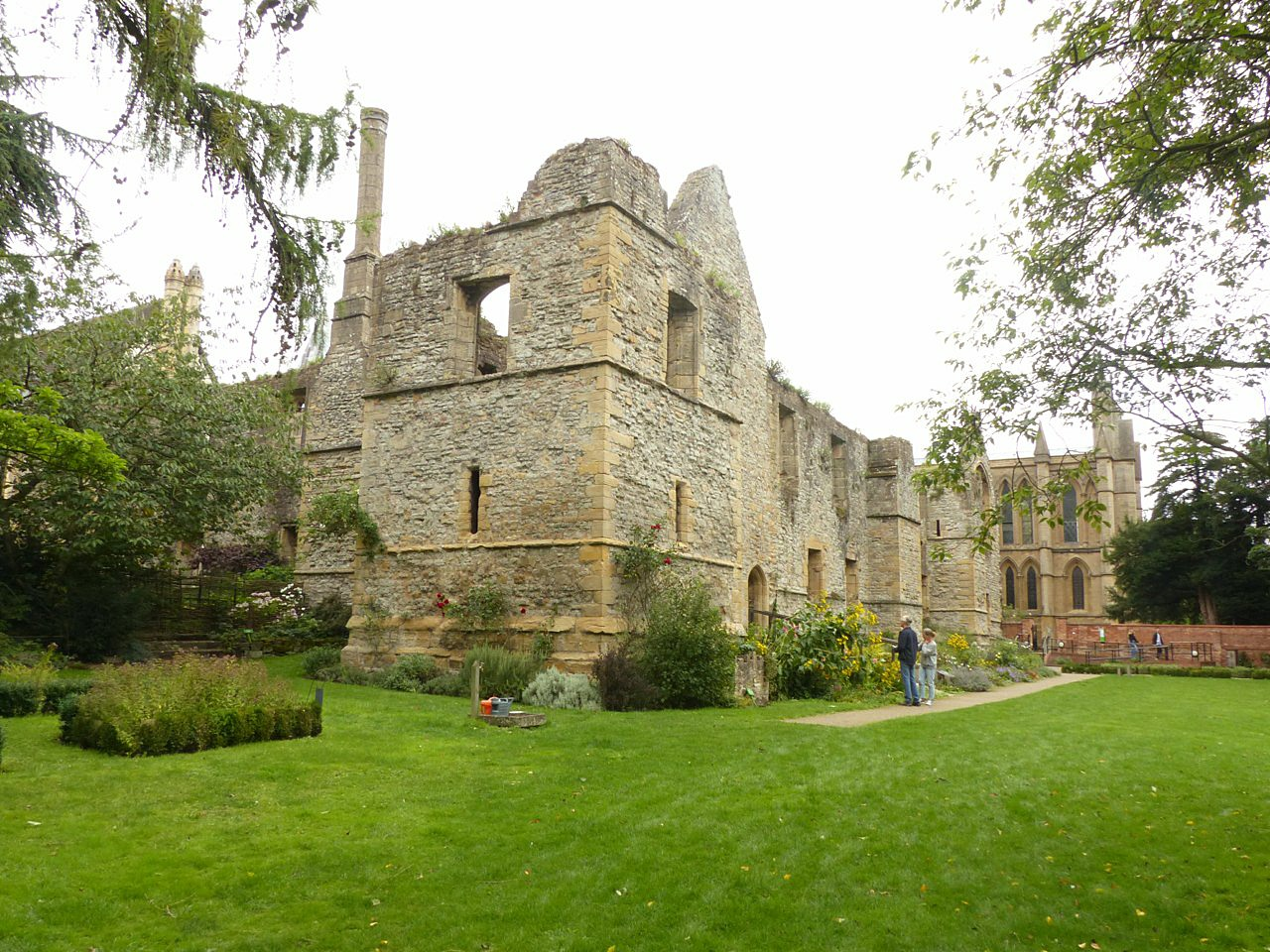
Elizabeth would wait for Mary at the Archbishop's Palace at Southwell

In April 1562, Thomas Randolph wrote about Mary's plans for the interview with Elizabeth. He thought the Scottish party would be dressed in black cloth, to suit Mary's wearing of mourning clothes and also save money. The courtiers were also worried about exchange rates.

Mary's plans were held up for a couple of weeks after she was bruised in a riding accident at Falkland Palace. She sent James Stewart, Lord Inchcolm to Elizabeth, and on 19 May asked the Privy Council to support her interview plans. Mary's brother, Lord James, Earl of Mar, suggested that Christopher Goodman would a suitable minister and preacher for the Scottish retinue in England.

At the end of May, Mary invited the Hepburn or Cockburn Laird of Ormistoun, the Earl of Cassilis, and others to come the borders for the meeting of the queens. They were instructed that her "whole train will be clad in dule, therefore address you and such as will be in your company in like sort". Mary went to Dunfermline on 9 June and waited for Maitland's return from Elizabeth's court.

Elizabeth was pleased with letters brought by Maitland and spoke in favour of the interview answering objections made by her privy councillors. She began to make arrangements for a meeting at York or near the River Trent at "Bartholomew Tide", meaning on 24 August. Lord Grey was anxious that Mary should not cross the Tweed at Norham Castle, which was in disrepair, and offered to make an honourable reception at Berwick-upon-Tweed. However, it was felt that news of the changing situation in France might end the project. Henry Sidney suggested that the English diplomat in Paris, Nicholas Throckmorton, was in a position to prevent the interview and save the expense, estimated at £40,000.

The French ambassador in London Paul de Foix made a memorandum detailing plans for the interview between Mary and Elizabeth. He had discussed the plans with William Maitland, who was finalising details at Greenwich Palace. De Foix's secretary was sent to show Charles IX of France the schedule of events. The Earls of Northumberland, Cumberland, Westmorland, and Lord Arundel would meet Mary at Berwick-upon-Tweed. The meeting would have been at Nottingham, and Elizabeth would have awaited Mary's arrival at the Bishop's Palace at Southwell.

Articles for the interview were agreed by Maitland and William Cecil, setting a date for the meeting between 20 August and 20 September 1562.

== Masque at Nottingham Castle ==
In July a tournament at the interview was announced. Elizabeth sent out invitations, including, on 5 July, Edward Seymour. He was asked to come to Nottingham Castle by 4 September 1562.

Entertainments involving masques were to be held at Nottingham Castle on three successive evenings. The hall of the castle would serve as a prison named Extreme Oblivion, kept by Argus or Circumspection. Fabrics provided from the Great Wardrobe for revels on 10 May include purple cloth of tissued with silver, velvet purple striped with gold, and green cloth of gold plain. Some building works were performed at the castle in preparation. The surveyor of the Queen's works, John Revell, and a team of craftsmen spent two or more weeks on site, and also made repairs at the House of Collyweston on the Great North Road from London.

Performers would enter on pageant floats or riding artificial animals. Pallas Athena would ride a unicorn, carrying a banner showing two clasped hands. Two crowned ladies would ride on lions, who represented Temperantia and Prudencia and the realms of Scotland and England. Pallas would give a speech in verse that False Report and Discord would be committed to the prison of Extreme Oblivion.

On the second night the hall would be the arranged as the Court of Plenty. A figure representing Peace on a chariot drawn by Friendship riding an elephant would be accompanied by 6 or 8 "ladyes maskers" in the hall of the castle. Two porters of the Court of Plenty, Ardent Desire and Perpetuity were introduced with a conduit flowing with wines, and then the English lords would dance with the Scottish ladies.

On the third night the plans of Disdain and Malice would be frustrated by Temperantia and Prudencia who displayed a shield inscribed "Ever" and a sword inscribed "Never" from the battlements of the castle or a pasteboard Court of Plenty. Discretion was to lay the shield and sword at the feet of the two Queens.

The masque and location would have reminded the audience of the historical story of the imprisonment of David II of Scotland at Nottingham Castle. He was said to have carved inscriptions in a dungeon.

== Cancelled ==
On 4 July 1562, the English Privy Council sent instructions to the Sheriff of Nottingham to prepare for the meeting of the Queens on 3 September. A "safe conduct" or passport document for Mary was prepared on 8 July. William Cecil and some members of the Privy Council were lukewarm about the event. The English party first suggested a later date in York and then cancelled the interview, citing the religious conflict in France since the massacre of Vassy as their motivation.

On 15 July, Henry Sidney was sent to Edinburgh to make excuses. Sidney reported that Mary wept, showing her grief "not only in words but in countenance and watery eyes". One of their meetings, in the garden of Holyrood Palace, was interrupted by a Captain Hepburn. He presented a rude drawing to Mary and was arrested.

Mary wrote to Elizabeth that she would be "frustrate for a season", and made a progress in Scotland, travelling to Aberdeen and Inverness Castle. In the north of Scotland, Mary took measures against the Earl of Huntly and the Gordon family. Huntly had opposed her plans for the interview, and in Edinburgh, John Gordon had fought with Lord Ogilvie and a member of her household James Ogilvie of Cardell.

In England, at Hampton Court, Elizabeth had an attack of smallpox in October 1562. Her illness heightened concerns about the succession and Mary's intentions.

A performance at Elizabeth's court at Whitehall Palace in June 1572, The Masque of Discord of Peace, seems to have had some similarities to the entertainment planned for the 1562 meeting.

== Mary in England ==
After Mary came to England in May 1568 she wished to meet Elizabeth, but Elizabeth was not keen on the idea. Mary continued to propose a meeting. In 1576, her secretary Claude Nau thought that Elizabeth might travel to Buxton incognito and visit Mary at Chatsworth. The French ambassador in London, Michel de Castelnau was sceptical about this idea. Mary and Elizabeth did not meet.

== In fiction ==
Fictional meetings between Mary and Elizabeth occur in novels and films, sometimes, as in Mary Queen of Scots (2018) and the opera Maria Stuarda, after Mary's flight to England in 1568.
