= Collyweston =

Village and civil parish in Northamptonshire, England

Coordinates: 52.61639°N 0.52917°W

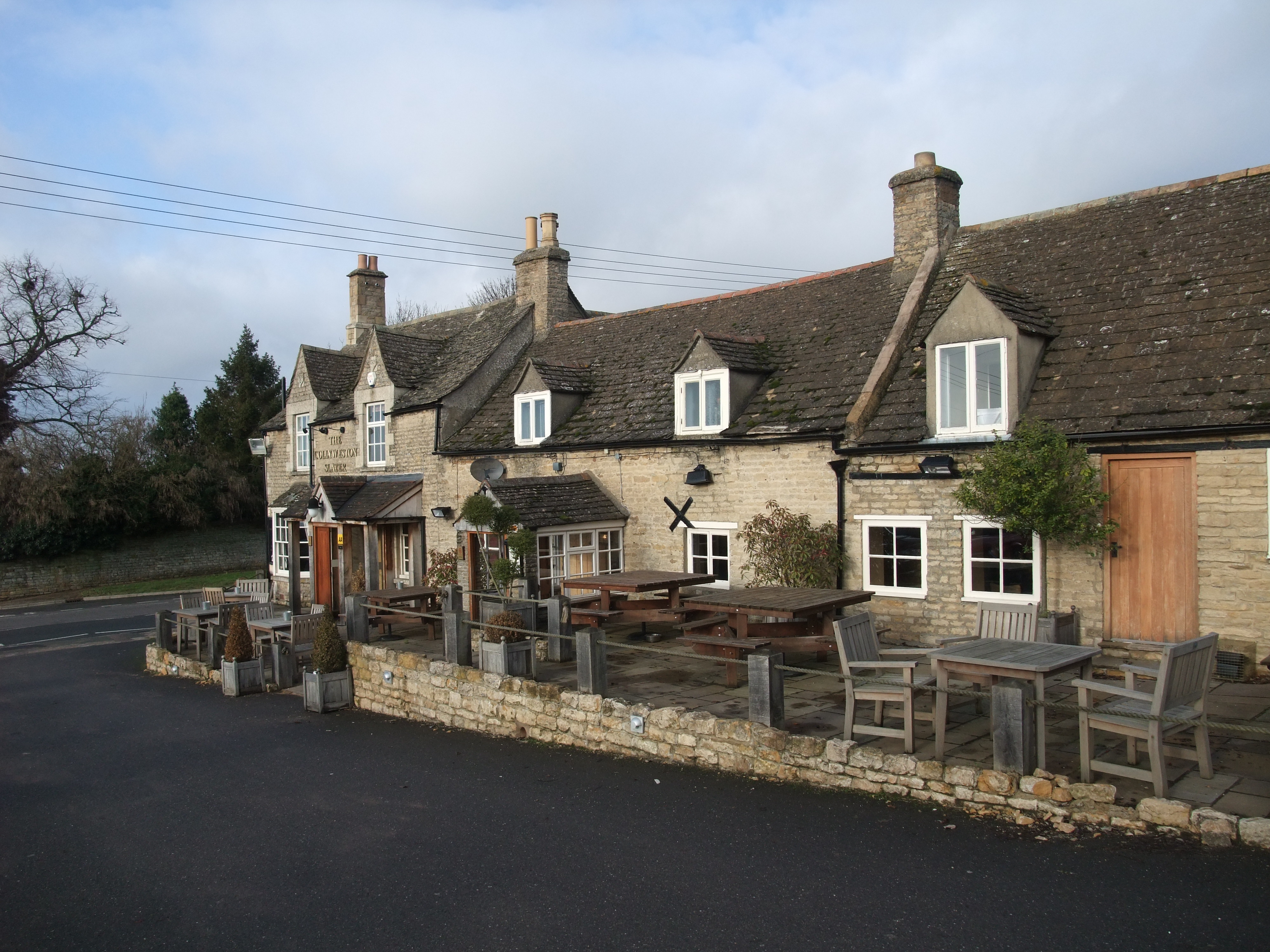
- The Collyweston Slater pub

- Location within Northamptonshire
- Population: 514 (2011 Census)
- OS grid reference: SK996030
- Civil parish: Collyweston
- Unitary authority: North Northamptonshire
- Ceremonial county: Northamptonshire
- Region: East Midlands
- Country: England
- Sovereign state: United Kingdom
- Post town: Stamford
- Postcode district: PE9
- Dialling code: 01780
- Police: Northamptonshire
- Fire: Northamptonshire
- Ambulance: East Midlands
- UK Parliament: Corby and East Northamptonshire

Collyweston is a village and civil parish in North Northamptonshire, about three miles southwest of Stamford, Lincolnshire, on the road (the A43) to Kettering. The population of the civil parish at the 2011 census was 514.

== Geography ==
The village is on the southern side of the Welland valley east of Tixover. The River Welland, at the point nearby to the northwest, is the boundary between Rutland and Northamptonshire. Ketton and Collyweston railway station was closed in 1966.

Collyweston is currently served by buses on the Stamford–to–Peterborough via Duddington route. The Jurassic Way and Hereward Way pass through the village to the north, crossing the Welland at Collyweston Bridge, near Geeston.

The A47 road passes through the parish to the south, with Collyweston Great Wood to the south. The road from the A47, continuing in a straight line to the village is called Kingscliffe Road.

=== Nature reserve ===
The local Wildlife Trust has a fifteen-acre nature reserve at Collyweston Quarries where Lincolnshire limestone was quarried, to the north of the A43. This has the pyramidal orchid, common dodder, greater knapweed, common rock-rose, common bird's foot trefoil, and clustered bellflower. Birds found there include the European green woodpecker and glowworms are found there in the summer.

There is also an SSSI at Collyweston Great Wood.

== History ==
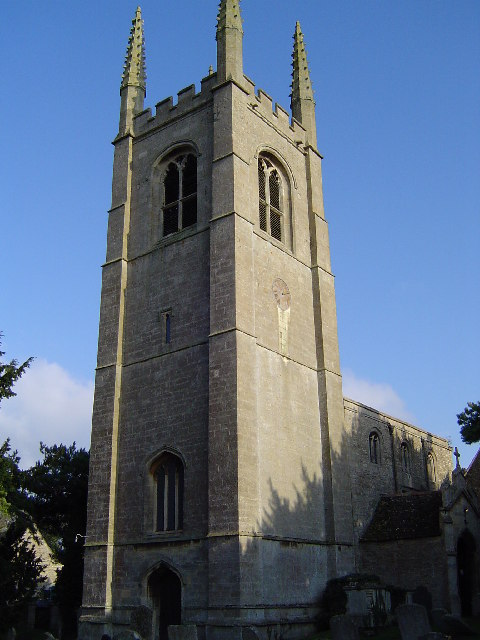
St Andrew's Church, Collyweston

The village's name means 'West farm/settlement'. Colin is a pet-form of Nicholas who held the manor in the 13th century. An alternative name for the village may be "Colyns Weston", in 1396.

A pub on Main Road is called 'The Collyweston Slater', owned by Everards Brewery. New houses have been built down a road called 'Collyns Way'. The parish church is St Andrew's, a Grade II* listed building.

John Stokesley (1475–1539), an English clergyman who was Bishop of London during the reign of Henry VIII was born in Collyweston. In the late sixteenth century, the place gave its name to the manner of wearing the mandilion 'Colley-Weston-ward' for unknown reasons.

=== Collyweston Palace ===
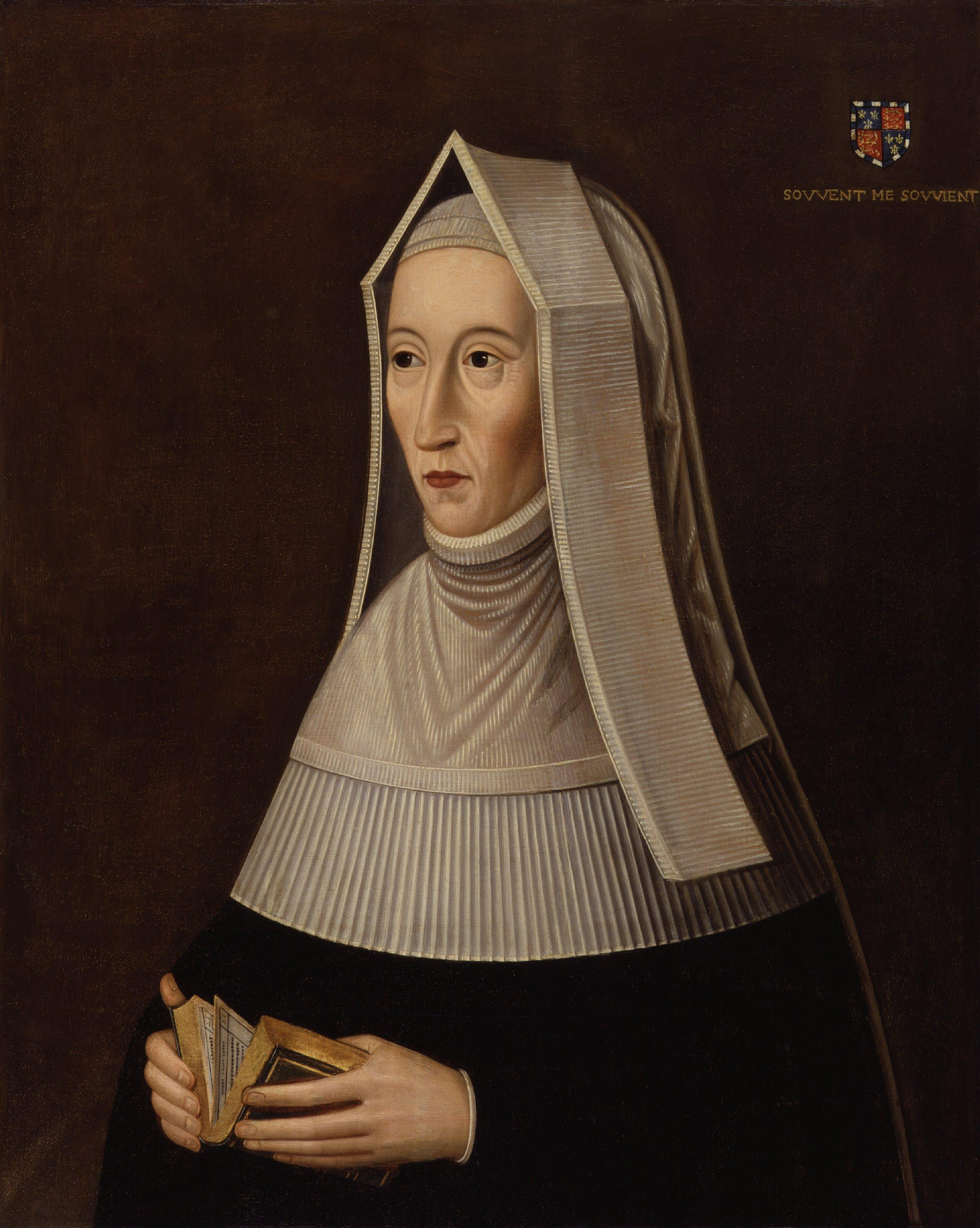
Margaret Beaufort, Countess of Richmond and Derby

Collyweston Palace was the home, in later life, of Lady Margaret Beaufort (1443–1509), the mother of Henry VII. Henry VII was at Collyweston in October 1493, and in September 1495 before moving on to "Rekyng" as he journeyed to Northampton. In 1498, though still married, Margaret Beaufort made a vow of chastity and chose to live at Collyweston.

The household of Margaret Beaufort at Collyweston, her chapel, and New Year's Day festivities at Collyweston with Princess Cecily were described for Mary I by Henry Parker, 10th Baron Morley, who had served Margaret Beaufort as a teenager.

New furnishings for Lady Margaret Beaufort's apartments at Collyweston were embroidered with her heraldic badges of roses and the portcullis by Sebastian Mussheka in 1498, and she donated textiles and vestments to the parish church at Collyweston, including a then old-fashioned green damask cope. Margaret Tudor (1489–1541) came to Collyweston in 1503 on her way to join her husband James IV of Scotland. One of her attendants, Elizabeth Zouche married Gerald FitzGerald, 9th Earl of Kildare (1487–1534) at the palace, and six Spanish dancers performed a morris dance.

In 1506, a priest, John Stokesley, was brought before Lady Margaret Beaufort's manor court charged with the crime of baptising a cat as part of a charm to find treasure. An inventory of Margaret Beaufort's wardrobe at Collyweston was made after her death in 1509. She had 20 fur-edged black gowns – some with trains, and some without them, a style known as "round".

Anthony Dryland, the bailie and keeper of Collyweston, was a member of the household of Henry FitzRoy, Duke of Richmond and Somerset, and the Duke lived at Collyweston from 1531 to 1536. Henry VIII gave the palace to Anne Boleyn in 1536. In 1550, Edward VI granted the manor to his sister Elizabeth.

Timber was sent to Collyweston from the Forest of Rockingham for works by the Master Carpenter John Revell in 1562. In 1566, the palace was extensively repaired for Elizabeth I. New windows for the Queen's lodging were glazed with the royal arms and badges. A new timber banqueting house was built. Elizabeth I came to Collyweston on her progress on 29 June 1566. According to Dominique Bourgoing, on 25 September 1586, Mary, Queen of Scots, travelled past the chasteau Collunwaston on her way to Fotheringhay.

In 1625 Charles I granted the manor to the Scottish courtier, Patrick Maule, later the Earl of Panmure. The building was dismantled in about 1640, leaving little trace. In 2023, its location was confirmed using ground-penetrating radar to find the main cluster of buildings, and the footings of walls were unearthed.

== "Collywest" ==
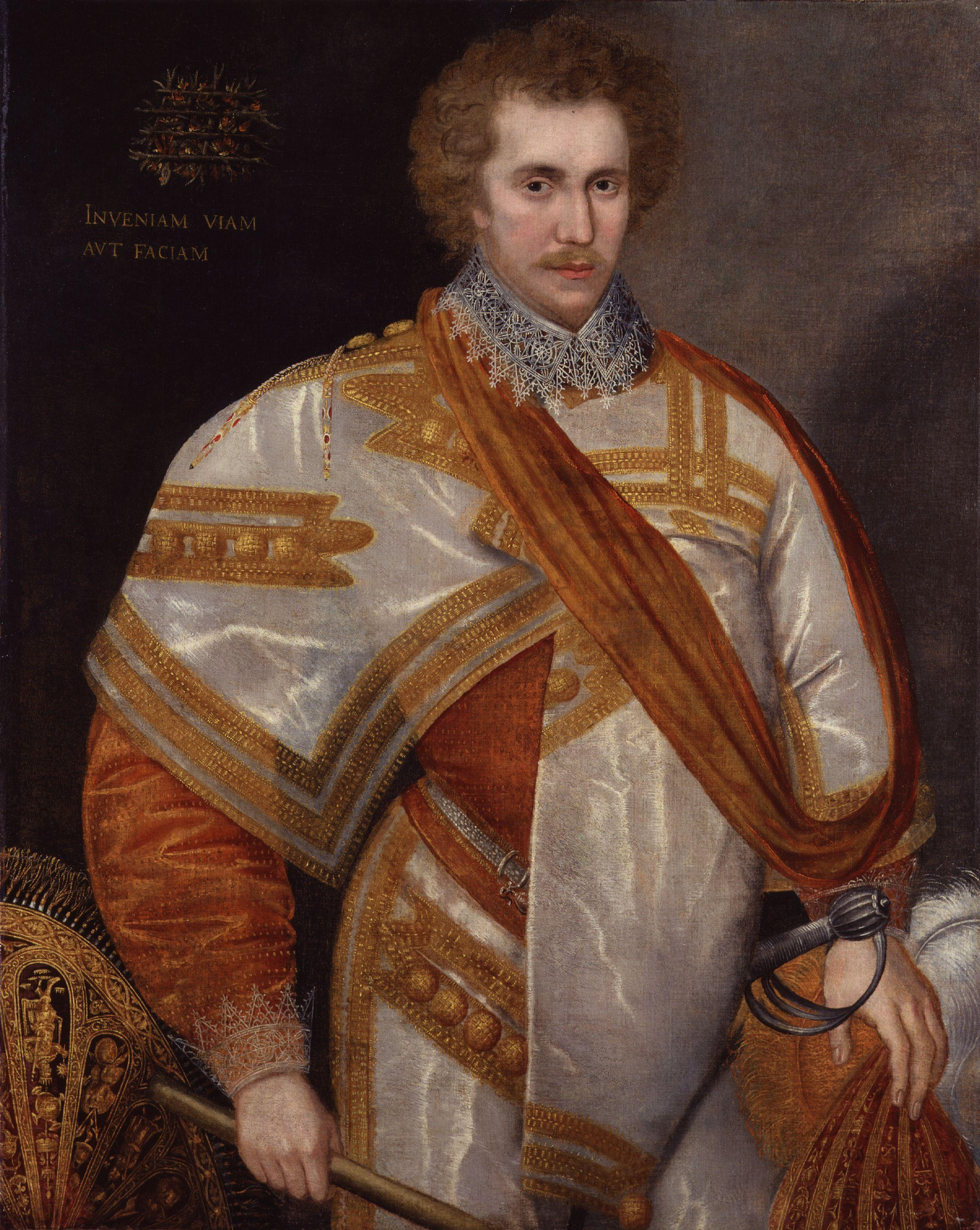
Robert Sidney, 1st Earl of Leicester wearing a mandilion 'colly-westonward'

The term 'collywest' (or 'colleywest', or 'collywesson') is a derivative of Collyweston that may be used to describe anything crooked, awry, wobbly, or generally disordered, or opposite, the wrong way, or contrary. It has been suggested that when slate was quarried in Collyweston, the good-quality, even pieces were sold, leaving the crooked poorer-quality pieces to use for the village's houses, making for very disordered rooftops. In the northern US, the term 'galley-west' is widely held by US dictionaries to be a derivative of 'collywest'.

== See also ==
- Collyweston Slate Mine
- Collyweston stone slate
- RAF Collyweston
