= John Revell =

English carpenter (died 1563)

John Revell (died 1563) was an English carpenter employed at royal castles and palaces. He became surveyor of the royal works in 1560.

== Career ==
John Revell's family were Londoners and carpenters. He is first recorded working on the house built for Henry VIII at Deptford. He became a warden of the Carpenter's Company in 1553.

He worked in Scotland in the 1540s strengthening forts and castles held by the English during the war known as the Rough Wooing, including Roxburgh Castle where he built a brewhouse. He was known as the Master Carpenter in the North Parts. "Revell the Master Carpenter" was sent to view Broughty Castle, Inchcolm, Roxburgh, Hume Castle and the fort at Eyemouth. Humphrey Revell, presumably a relative, was Master Carpenter of Berwick-upon-Tweed from 1550.

Revell contributed to the repair of bridges or landing stages on the Thames at Blackfriars and the Temple. He was employed at the building of Somerset House for Edward Seymour, 1st Duke of Somerset and its refurbishment for Princess Elizabeth in 1553.

As surveyor of the Queen's works in 1562, Revell managed preparations at Nottingham Castle for the planned interview between Elizabeth I and Mary, Queen of Scots. The event was cancelled. Around the same time, timber was sent to him from the Forest of Rockingham for repairs at Collyweston Palace.

John Revell died on 12 December 1563. His widow was a sister of the London mercer Hugh Brynckelowe and a relation of the author Henry Brinklow.
