= Mandilion =

Loose hip-length pullover coat or jacket

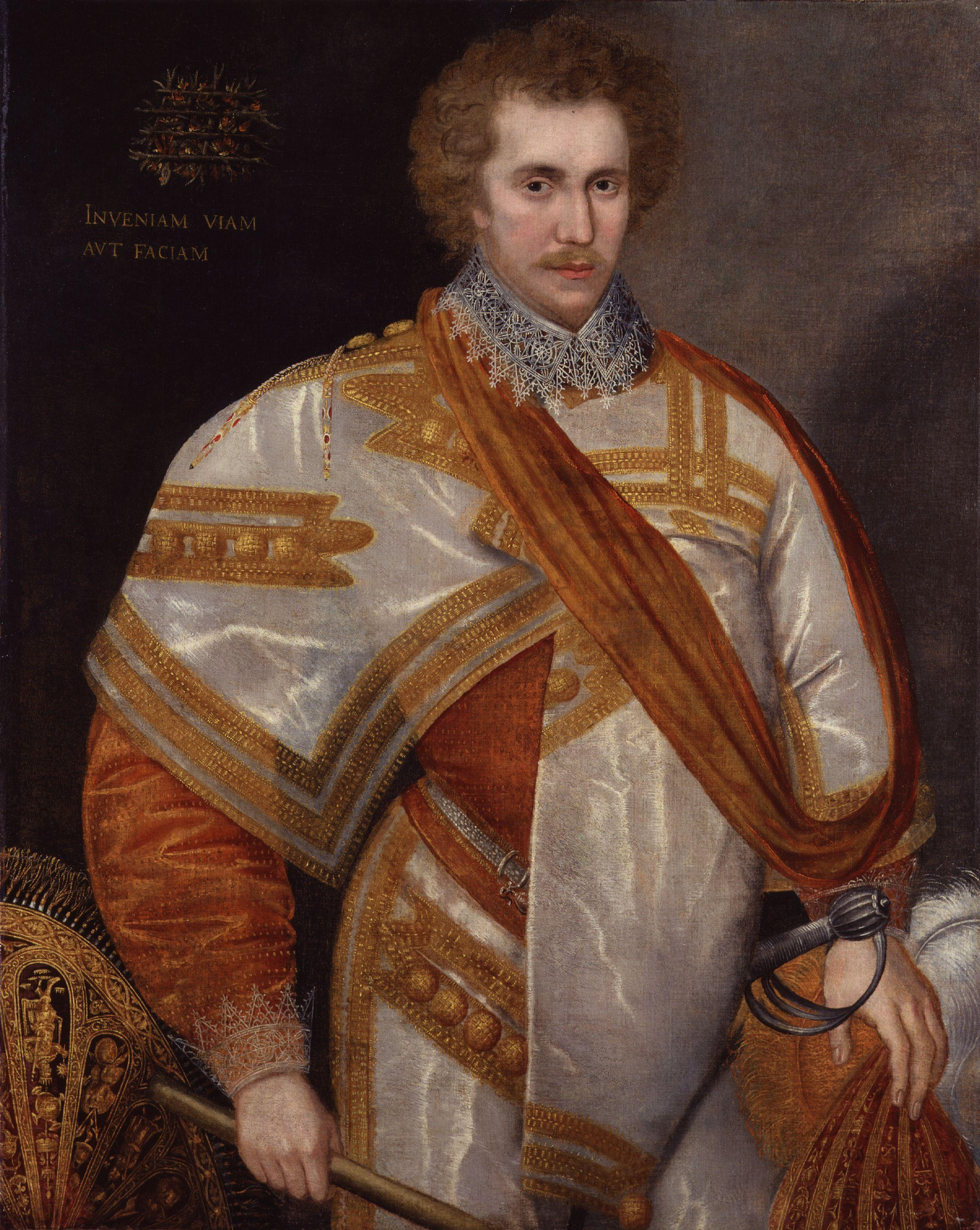
Robert Sidney, 1st Earl of Leicester wearing a mandilion colly-westonward

A mandilion or mandelion is a loose men's hip-length pullover coat or jacket, open down the sides, worn in England in late sixteenth century.

It was fashionable to wear the mandilion colly-westonward or Colley-Weston-ward, that is, rotated 90 degrees so that the front and back were draped over the arms and the sleeves hung down in front and behind.

"...sithence such is our mutability that to-day there is none to the Spanish guise, to-morrow the French toys are most fine and delectable, ere long no such apparel as that which is after the high Almaine fashion, by-and-by the Turkish manner is generally best liked of, otherwise the Morisco gowns, the Barbarian fleeces, the mandilion worn to Colley-Weston ward, and the short French breeches make such a comely vesture that, except it were a dog in a doublet, you shall not see any so disguised as are my countrymen of England." - William Harrison, The Description of Elizabethan England (1577), 'Of Our Apparel and Attire'.

Why the fashion was named after the small village of Collyweston in Northamptonshire remains uncertain.

See Chaperon for a similar development in the medieval hood-turned-hat.
