= John Stokesley =

English prelate, Bishop of London (1475–1539)

The Right Reverend John Stokesley
- Bishop of London
- Church: Roman Catholic
- Diocese: Diocese of London
- Elected: 1530
- Term ended: 1539 (death)
- Predecessor: Cuthbert Tunstall
- Successor: Edmund Bonner

Orders
- Ordination: 1504 (deacon), 1505 (priest)
- Consecration: c. 1530 by John Longland

Personal details
- Born: 8 September 1475 Collyweston, Northamptonshire
- Died: 8 September 1539
- Denomination: Catholic
- Profession: Academic
- Education: Magdalen College, Oxford

John Stokesley (8 September 1475 – 8 September 1539) was an English clergyman who was Bishop of London during the reign of Henry VIII.

== Life ==
Stokesley was born at Collyweston in Northamptonshire, and became a fellow of Magdalen College, Oxford, in 1495, serving also as a lecturer. He graduated MA in 1500, and was successively ordained a deacon in 1504, a priest in 1505, and then proceeded DTh in 1516. In 1498 he was made principal of Magdalen Hall, and in 1505 vice-president of Magdalen College. Soon after 1509 he was appointed a member of the royal council, and chaplain and almoner to Henry VIII; he attended Henry as his chaplain at the Field of the Cloth of Gold in 1520. He succeeded his relative Richard Stokesley as rector of North Luffenham, Rutland, in 1527.

In 1529 and 1530 he went to France and Italy as ambassador to Francis I and to gain opinions from foreign universities in favour of the king's divorce from Catherine of Aragon.

He became Bishop of London and Lord Almoner in 1530, and in September 1533 christened the future Queen Elizabeth. His later years were troubled by disputes with Archbishop Cranmer; Stokesley opposed all changes in the doctrines of the church, remaining hostile to the English Bible and fought to maintain all seven traditional sacraments, shrines and pilgrimages. Stokesley was a staunch opponent of Lutheranism, and very active in persecuting heretics: John Foxe claimed Stokesley boasted on his deathbed of having been the means of executing over thirty heretics.

In May 1538, the King's attorney took out a writ of Praemunire against Stokesley and, as accessories with him, against the Abbess Agnes Jordan and the Confessor-General of Syon Abbey. Stokesley acknowledged his guilt, implored Thomas Cromwell's intercession, and threw himself on the King's mercy. He obtained the King's pardon.

He was one of the primary architects of the Six Articles of 1539, which enshrined traditional religion into law. They became law in June 1539.

Stokesley died on 8 September 1539, and was buried in Old St Paul's Cathedral on 14 September 1539.

== Works ==
Stokesley was a man of learning. He was well-versed in philosophy and theology, and had knowledge of the classical languages of Latin, Greek, and Hebrew. He wrote in favour of Henry's divorce, and with Cuthbert Tunstall, Bishop of Durham, a treatise against Henry VIII's kinsman Cardinal Pole.

== Sources ==
- Chibi, Andrew A. (1997). Henry VIII's Conservative Scholar: Bishop John Stokesley and the Divorce, Royal Supremacy, and Doctrinal Reform. Peter Lang Pub Inc. ISBN 978-0-8204-3403-2.
- Chibi, Andrew A. (2004). "Stokesley, John". Oxford Dictionary of National Biography (online ed.). Oxford: Oxford University Press. doi:10.1093/ref:odnb/26563. (Subscription, Wikipedia Library access or UK public library membership required.)
- Foster, Joseph, ed. (1891). Stermont-Synge in 'Alumni Oxonienses 1500-1714' . Oxford.
- MacCulloch, Diarmaid (1996). Thomas Cranmer: A Life. London: Yale University Press. ISBN 0-300-06688-0..
- Pollard, Albert (1898). "Stokesley, John" . Dictionary of National Biography. Vol. 54. pp. 403–405.
- Wriothesley, Charles (1875). Hamilton, William Douglas (ed.). A Chronicle of England During the Reigns of the Tudors, from A.D. 1485 to 1559. Camden Society.

Catholic Church titles
Church of England titles
Preceded by Cuthbert Tunstall	Bishop of London; 1530–1539	Succeeded by Edmund Bonner
