= Fineshade Priory =

Priory in Northamptonshire, England

Coordinates: 52.56883°N 0.56513°W

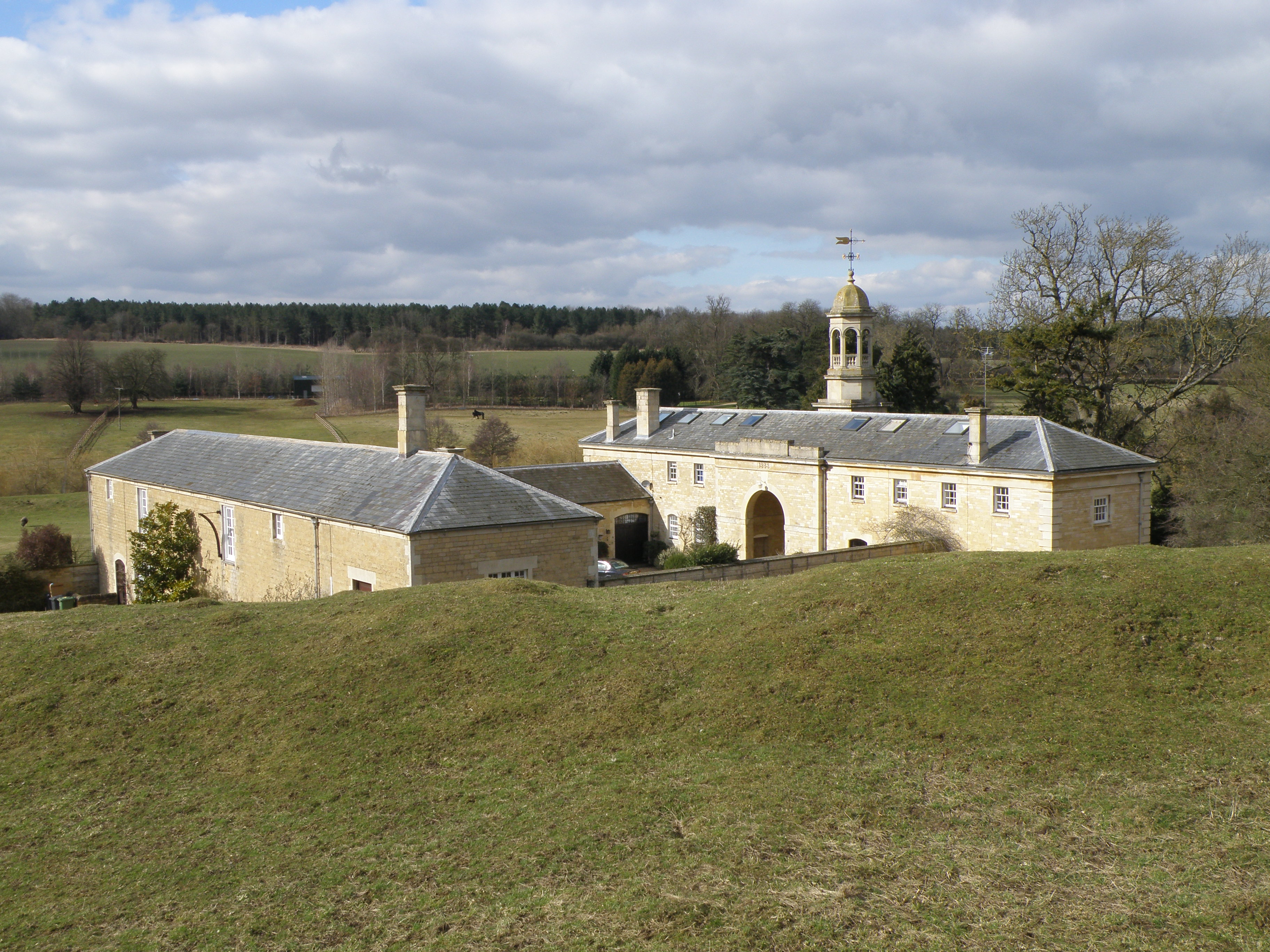
Fineshade Abbey Stables

Fineshade Priory was a priory of Augustinian Canons Regular in Northamptonshire, England. The remains of the site are now in the parish of Duddington-with-Fineshade, about 5 miles (8.0 km) north-east of Corby along the A43 road.

It was founded before 1208 by Richard Engayne (Engain), Lord of Blatherwycke, on the site of a small motte and bailey castle and dissolved in 1536.

The buildings were granted to Lord Russell 1541/2. Sir Robert Kirkham bought it in 1545 and converted the west range into a country residence, which was demolished along with the remains of the priory in 1749.

A house was subsequently built on the site but demolished in 1956. The stable block remains, converted to a residence; it is a Grade II listed building. The site of "Fineshade motte and bailey castle and abbey" is a scheduled monument.

Fineshade Wood is part of Rockingham Forest. The civil parish has merged with Duddington.
