= Duddington =

Village in Northamptonshire, England

Coordinates: 52.596°N 0.540°W

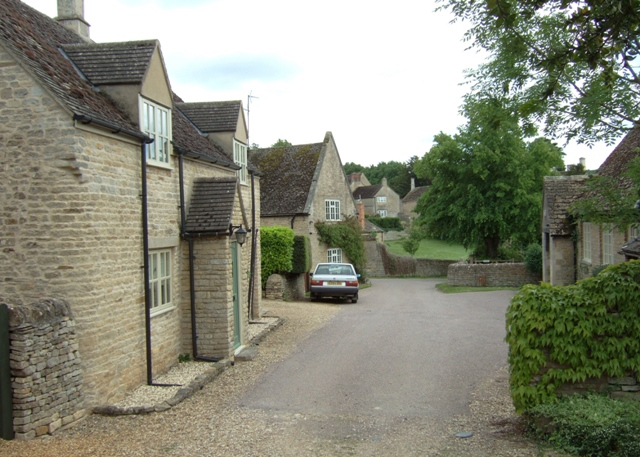
- Duddington Village

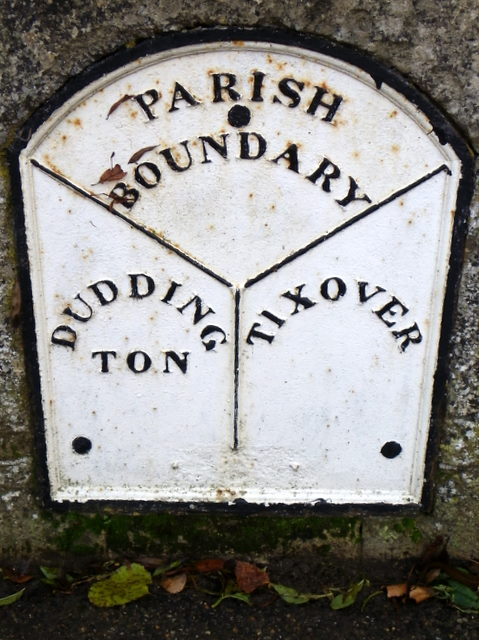
- 19th-century plaque on the bridge, marking the boundary with Tixover

- Location within Northamptonshire
- Population: 281 (civil parish, 2011 Census)
- OS grid reference: SK988011
- Civil parish: Duddington-with-Fineshade
- Unitary authority: North Northamptonshire
- Ceremonial county: Northamptonshire
- Region: East Midlands
- Country: England
- Sovereign state: United Kingdom
- Post town: STAMFORD
- Postcode district: PE9
- Dialling code: 01780
- Police: Northamptonshire
- Fire: Northamptonshire
- Ambulance: East Midlands
- UK Parliament: Corby and East Northamptonshire

Duddington is a village and former civil parish in North Northamptonshire, England. It lies beside the River Welland, close to the boundary with Rutland, approximately 6 miles (10 km) south-west of Stamford, near the junction of the A43 and A47. The village is the principal settlement of the civil parish of Duddington-with-Fineshade.

Duddington has a substantial concentration of historic buildings, including the Grade II* listed Church of St Mary, the 17th-century Duddington Manor, the late-medieval Stocks Hill House, Duddington Mill and the medieval Duddington Bridge. Much of the historic village has formed the Duddington Conservation Area since 1971.

The village was historically associated with the Jackson family of Duddington, who occupied Duddington Manor from the 17th century and were involved in the provision of education in the village.

== History ==
=== Name ===
The name Duddington means a farm or settlement connected with a person named Dudda or Dodda.

=== Domesday and medieval period ===
Duddington appears in the Domesday Book of 1086 as Dodintone and formed part of Willybrook Hundred.

The estate had 13 recorded households, comprising ten villagers, two smallholders and a priest. Its resources included eight ploughlands, ten acres of meadow, woodland and a mill valued at four shillings. Before the Norman Conquest it had been held by Edward the Confessor; by 1086 the tenant-in-chief and lord was King William I.

The presence of a priest in 1086 provides evidence for ecclesiastical activity in Duddington before the construction of the surviving medieval church. The earliest surviving parts of St Mary's Church date from the 12th century.

A bridge over the River Welland was documented by 1380, when jurors of Willybrook Hundred reported that Duddington Bridge was broken and should be repaired by the township. The surviving bridge is substantially late medieval.

=== Agricultural landscape ===
Duddington's medieval and early modern farmland was organised around an open-field system. Three common fields lay to the north, east and south of the village, and traces of their ridge-and-furrow cultivation survive in the surrounding landscape.

The common fields were enclosed by Act of Parliament in 1774. An enclosure map was prepared in 1775, while a detailed map of Duddington dating from 1798 records the assarted agricultural landscape and many buildings and boundaries around the settlement.

The historic landscape was surveyed by the Royal Commission on the Historical Monuments of England, whose inventory of north Northamptonshire records numerous surviving buildings and earthworks at Duddington.

=== Jackson family of Duddington ===
The Jackson family of Duddington was associated with Duddington Manor, the parish church and village education from the 17th century onwards.

Duddington Manor contains a datestone inscribed "NI 1633". The official Historic England list entry identifies the initials as referring to Nicholas Jackson and records the house as remaining in Jackson family ownership from the 17th century.

The family also established a long-running educational foundation in the village. In 1667 William Jackson left £50 for the construction of a school and endowed it with £10 annually for a schoolmaster to educate twelve poor children born and living in Duddington.

The earlier school was replaced in 1842 by a two-storey schoolhouse and adjoining schoolroom. A stone panel bears the inscription HJ 1842, referring to Hugh Jackson.

A post office was established in the building in 1844. The schoolmaster, Edward Wheelband, also served as postmaster, and a blocked opening bearing the inscription "letter box" survives in the building.

A further school was built in 1891–92 to designs by Stamford architect Joseph Boothroyd Corby and was provided by W. Goddard Jackson.

Members of the family are also commemorated in St Mary's Church. The Northamptonshire Historic Environment Record records a monument to William Jackson, died 1667, a marble tablet to Thomas Jackson, died 1792, and a number of later tablets commemorating members of the Goddard-Jackson family associated with Duddington Manor.

=== Civil parish ===
Duddington was formerly a civil parish in its own right. In 1961 its population was 184.

On 1 April 1988 the civil parishes of Duddington and Fineshade were abolished and combined to form Duddington-with-Fineshade.

The combined parish had 281 residents at the 2011 census.

== Historic buildings ==
=== Church of St Mary ===
St Mary's Church

The Church of St Mary is the parish church of Duddington and is a Grade II* listed building.

The church contains work of the mid and late 12th century, with additions and alterations from the 13th and 14th centuries. It consists of an aisled nave, chancel, south porch, north vestry and a south-east tower with a short broach spire.

Romanesque sculpture survives in the eastern bays of the north and south arcades, the two south doorways and the south tower window.

The chancel was rebuilt and the church restored in about 1844 by architect Bryan Browning.

Interior features include an 18th-century communion rail, a 19th-century east window and pews incorporating reused 17th-century panelling. The church contains numerous funerary monuments, including those of the Jackson and Goddard-Jackson families.

Earlier antiquarian descriptions of the church were published by John Bridges in his History and Antiquities of Northamptonshire and by George Baker in his 19th-century history of the county.

=== Duddington Manor ===
Duddington Manor is a Grade II listed house on High Street.

The oldest dated portion of the house bears the inscription NI 1633, associated by Historic England with Nicholas Jackson. The early structure appears to have been a two-unit house aligned at right angles to High Street rather than originally being designed as a formal manor house.

It was enlarged in the later 17th century and altered further during the 18th and 19th centuries. The house is constructed mainly of squared coursed limestone with ashlar dressings and a Collyweston stone slate roof.

Interior features recorded by Historic England include 17th-century-style panelling, some probably reset from the earlier house, and a large stone fireplace in the entrance hall.

The manor is also recorded in the RCHME inventory and Northamptonshire Historic Environment Record.

=== Stocks Hill House ===
Stocks Hill House is a Grade II listed former hall house and one of the oldest surviving domestic buildings in Duddington.

Its central section dates from the late 15th century and originally contained an open hall. The building was altered during the 17th century, when the hall was floored over, and has datestones of 1601 and 1858.

Surviving features include parts of the medieval roof structure, stone-mullioned windows and later fireplaces. The building was formerly known as a manor house.

=== Former schoolhouse and post office ===
The former schoolhouse on High Street largely dates from the rebuilding of 1842, although the educational foundation itself dates to William Jackson's endowment of 1667.

It comprises a two-storey stone schoolhouse with an adjoining former schoolroom. The RCHME recorded the building in its architectural inventory, while Pevsner's revised Northamptonshire volume also discusses the school buildings.

The building later accommodated the village post office, established there in 1844.

=== Duddington Mill ===
The River Welland at Duddington Mill

A mill was recorded at Duddington in the Domesday survey. The surviving Duddington Mill, however, is substantially later.

The present building is Grade II listed and bears datestones of 1664, 1724 and 1793, representing successive phases of construction and rebuilding.

It is built principally from coursed limestone and brick with a Collyweston slate roof. The River Welland and mill leat supplied its water power. The RCHME included the mill in its inventory of north Northamptonshire monuments.

The mill is also recognised as part of Northamptonshire's industrial heritage.

In 1940 artist Stanley Roy Badmin painted The Mill, Duddington for the wartime Recording Britain project. The watercolour is now held by the Victoria and Albert Museum.

=== Duddington Bridge ===
Duddington Bridge over the River Welland

Duddington Bridge crosses the River Welland at the western edge of the village. It is a Grade II listed bridge and is separately protected as a scheduled monument.

The bridge is medieval in origin. A presentment made by jurors of Willybrook Hundred in 1380 stated that Duddington Bridge was broken and ought to be repaired by the township.

The surviving structure is generally dated to the 15th century. It has four principal pointed arches, with an additional opening through the southern causeway for floodwater.

The bridge was approximately doubled in width on its downstream side in 1919. A 19th-century cast-iron boundary marker at its centre identifies the historic boundary between Duddington and Tixover.

Historian P. Goodfellow discussed Duddington Bridge in a study of medieval bridges in Northamptonshire published in Northamptonshire Past & Present.

=== Other historic buildings ===
A number of other historic buildings contribute to the character of Duddington.

Church Farmhouse is a Grade II listed building and is shown on the 1775 enclosure map. Its interior incorporates reset 17th-century panelling.

Crownfield Cottage on Church Lane preserves 17th-century architectural features, including ovolo-moulded stone mullioned windows, and is recorded in the RCHME inventory.

Other historic buildings recorded by the Northamptonshire HER include Home Farmhouse, Manor Farmhouse, Dial House, Braddan House and numerous cottages and agricultural buildings.

== Conservation area ==
Much of historic Duddington lies within the Duddington Conservation Area, which was designated on 22 January 1971.

The village retains a high concentration of traditional limestone buildings and boundary walls, many roofed in Collyweston stone slate or other traditional materials. The conservation area includes the historic core around High Street, Church Lane and Mill Street.

An Article 4 direction affecting properties in Duddington was made on 18 February 1993, giving additional planning control over specified alterations which might otherwise constitute permitted development.

The significance of the historic environment is also recognised in the Duddington with Fineshade Neighbourhood Plan, which maps the conservation area, archaeological sites and other historic-environment assets within the parish.

== 1997 Harrier crash ==
On 31 October 1997 at approximately 4:25 pm, Harrier GR.7 ZD324 of No. 3 Squadron RAF, based at nearby RAF Wittering, crashed near Duddington.

== Community and governance ==
The 2011 census recorded 281 residents in the combined civil parish of Duddington-with-Fineshade.

The village church is part of the ecclesiastical parish of Duddington within the Diocese of Peterborough.

The Royal Oak has historically served as the village public house.

Duddington forms part of the civil parish of Duddington-with-Fineshade, which has a parish council. The whole civil parish was designated as a neighbourhood planning area in 2016.

Following examination and a local referendum held on 5 September 2024, the Duddington with Fineshade Neighbourhood Plan was formally made by North Northamptonshire Council on 10 October 2024.

At local-government level Duddington is within the North Northamptonshire unitary authority. For parliamentary elections it is in the Corby and East Northamptonshire constituency.

Historically, bus services serving the village included the 404 route between Stamford and Peterborough and service 47 between Peterborough and Oakham.

== See also ==
- Fineshade Priory
- Fineshade Wood
- River Welland
