= Fineshade Wood =

Wooded area in Northamptonshire, England

Coordinates: 52.57945°N 0.54327°W

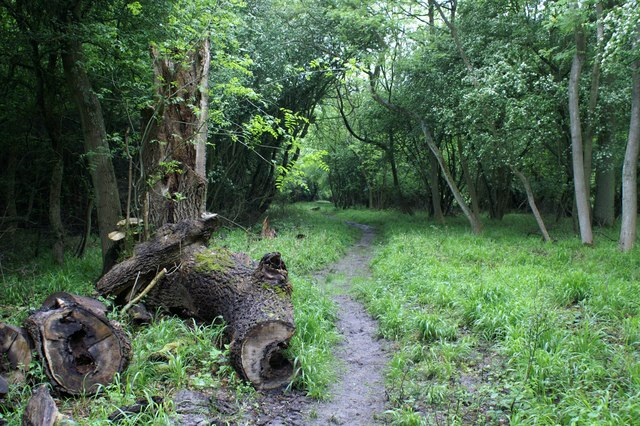
The Jurassic Way through Fineshade Wood

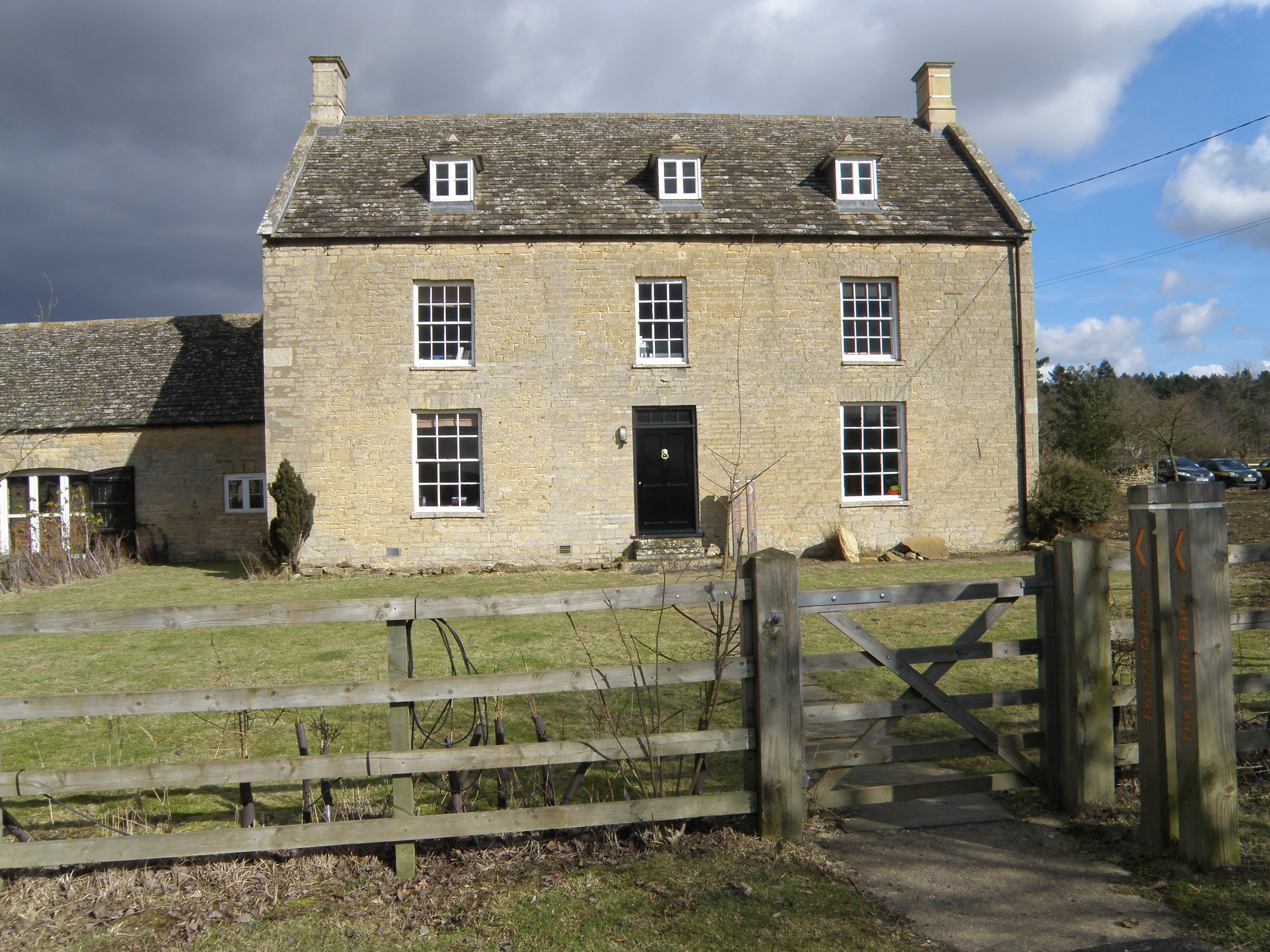
Top Lodge, Fineshade

Fineshade Wood is a large wooded area in the county of Northamptonshire in the English East Midlands region. The wood is managed by the Forestry England and is part of the former royal hunting forest of Rockingham Forest.

The wood is located east of the A43 road between Stamford and Corby. It is a former deer park. Part of it is publicly owned, and part leased by Forestry England. It has a visitor centre at Top Lodge; and also houses Forestry England offices. Fineshade attracts visitors from all over the UK, and particularly from the nearby settlements of Stamford, Corby, and Peterborough.

Fineshade is known for its population of red kites, and a Red Kite Centre was opened there in 2001. It also has adders and other reptiles as well as scarce breeding birds including nightingale, nightjar, woodcock, grasshopper warbler, tree pipit, marsh and willow tits. Dormice have been recorded together with great crested and palmate newts.

The site has a caravan and motorhome park which is open from Easter to October.

== See also ==
- Fineshade Priory
