= Collyweston stone slate =

Traditional limestone roofing material of central England

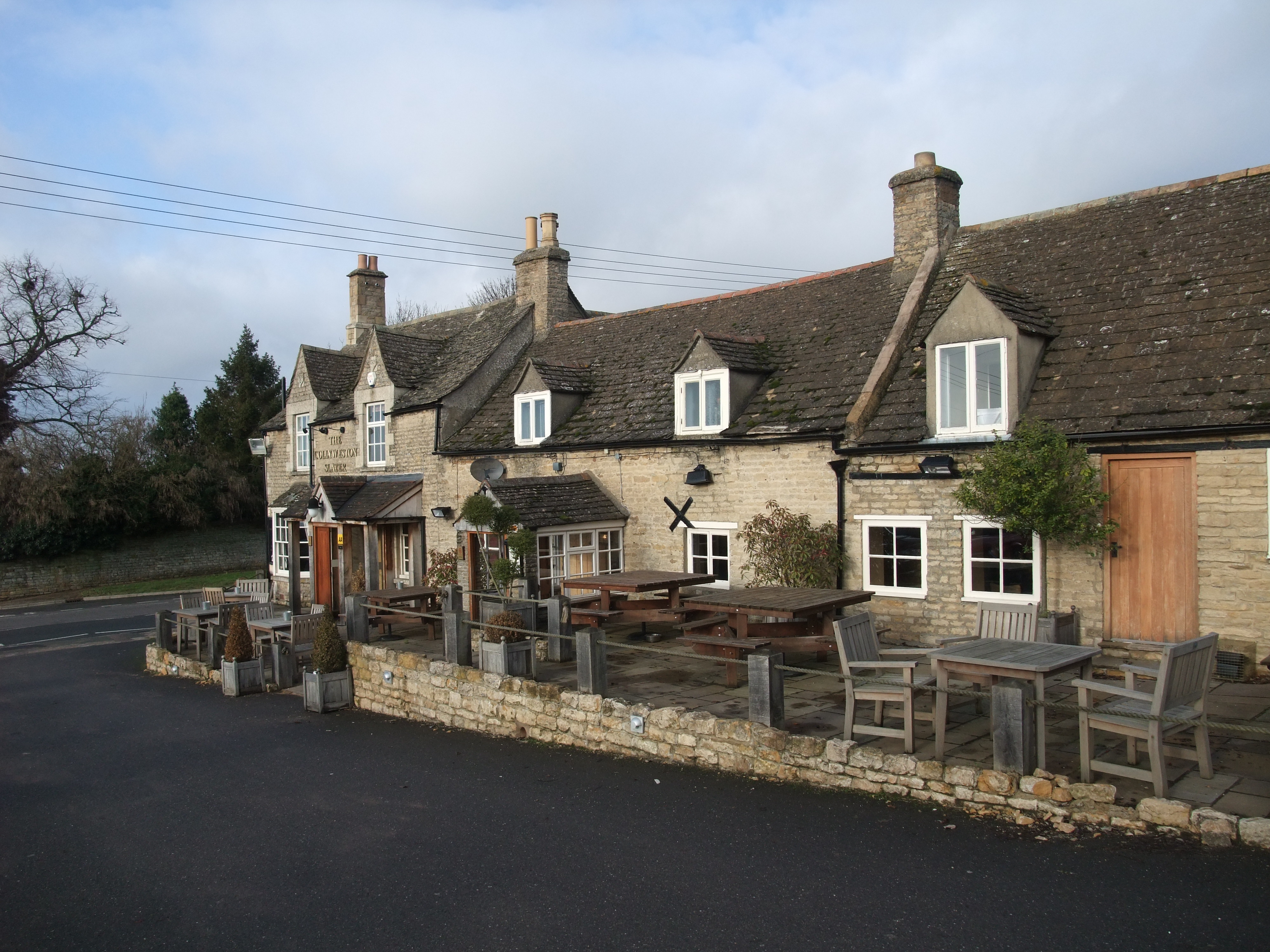
The Collyweston Slater pub in Collyweston with a Collyweston slate roof

Collyweston stone slate is a traditional roofing material found in east-central England, primarily in Northamptonshire, Cambridgeshire, Lincolnshire, and Rutland.

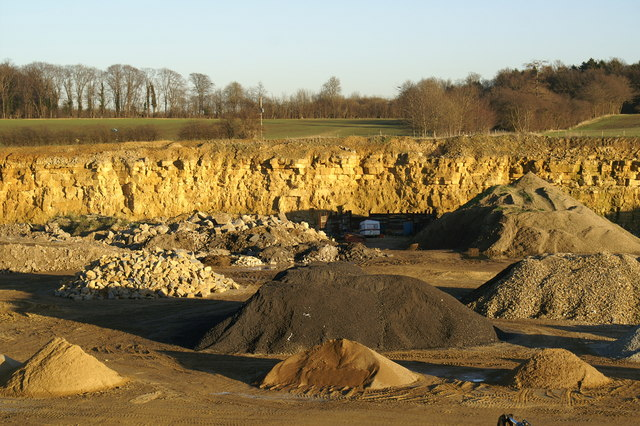
Collyweston quarry at Duddington

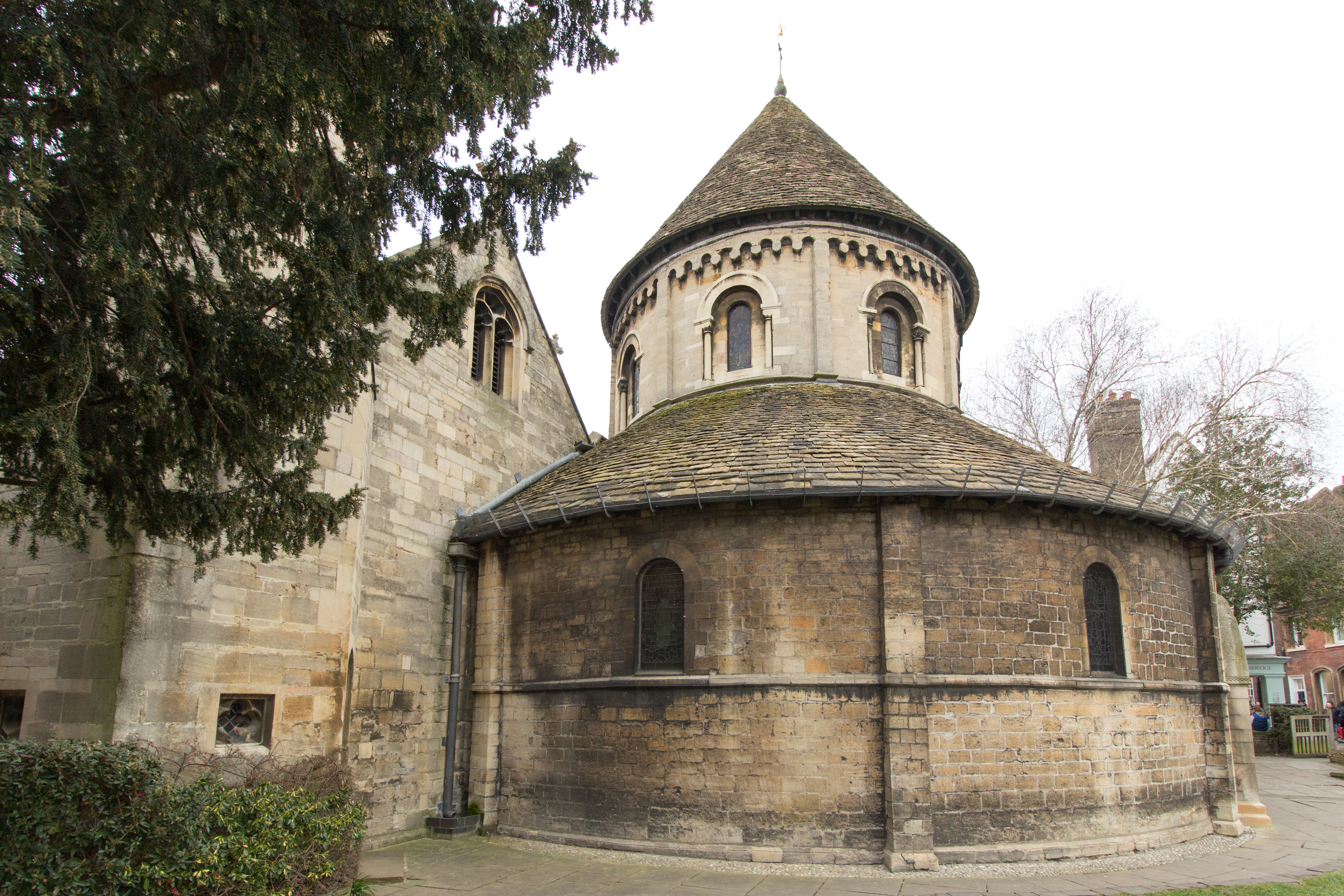
Collyweston roofs on the Round Church, Cambridge

It is not a proper slate but a limestone found in narrow beds. It is considerably heavier than true slate.

Geologically, the Collyweston slate forms part of the Lower Lincolnshire Limestone Member of the Lincolnshire Limestone Formation, part of the Inferior Oolite Group, dating to the Bajocian age of the Middle Jurassic, around 170 million years ago.

The slates are quarried near the village of Collyweston in Northamptonshire, near Stamford and close to the borders of Lincolnshire and Rutland. Traditionally the mined stone was left outside for three winters until the frost revealed layers that could be broken ("clived") into flat slates.

In the late 1990s, English Heritage (now Historic England) worked with the Burghley Estate and Sheffield Hallam University to develop an artificial system to reproduce the freeze-thaw cycle needed for production of slates. In 2012, when new slates were needed to reroof parts of Apethorpe Palace, further testing was commissioned by English Heritage to develop the artificial frosting and new Collyweston slates have been produced. New slates have been used to repair the roofs of Ufford Church in Cambridgeshire and High Wycombe Guildhall.

In 2015 a planning application to reopen a slate mine in Collyweston was approved; the slate mines had not been used since the 1960s. Slate from the mine has been used to repair Bodley's Court in King's College, Cambridge, Clare College, Cambridge and Old Westbury Gardens in Long Island in New York.

== See also ==
- Lincolnshire limestone
