= Rockingham Forest =

Forest in Northamptonshire, England

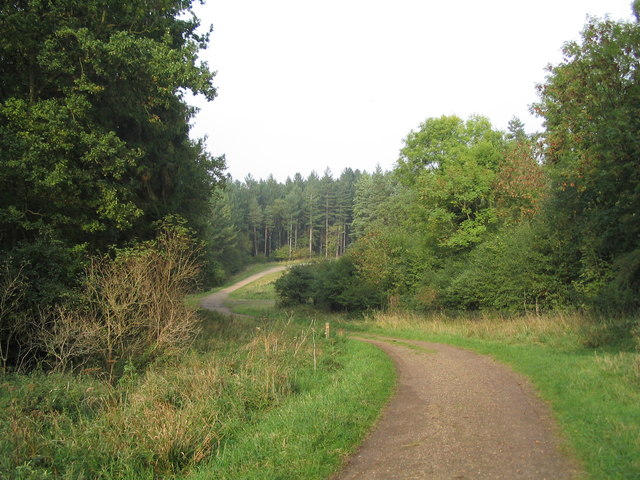
- A track through Fineshade Wood, part of Rockingham Forest.

- Location within Northamptonshire

Geography
- Location: Northamptonshire and Cambridgeshire, England, United Kingdom
- Coordinates: 52.45°N 0.59°W
- Area: 200 m^{2} (2,200 sq ft)

Rockingham Forest is a former royal hunting forest primarily located in the English county of Northamptonshire, with a small section extending into neighbouring Cambridgeshire. It is an area of some 200 sq mi (500 km^{2}) lying between the River Welland and River Nene and the towns of Stamford and Kettering. It has a rich and varied landscape, with farmland, open pasture, pockets of woodland and villages built from local stone.

== History ==
The forest was named after the village of Rockingham, where the castle was a royal retreat. The boundaries were marked by the River Nene on the eastern side and on the western side what is now the A508 road from Market Harborough to Northampton. Over the years the forest shrank, and today only a patchwork of the north-eastern part of the forest remains. The bulk of this remaining area of forest is located within a square, of which the corners are Corby, Kettering, Thrapston and Oundle.

The area became a royal hunting ground for King William I after the Norman conquest. The term forest represented an area of legal jurisdiction and remained so until the 19th century.

A Cistercian abbey was established in 1143 which became known as Pipewell Abbey. In 1298 the de Lacys were granted permission to inclose 30 acres (12 ha) pertaining to the manor of Wadenhoe, lying within the forest, in order to make a park. The forest boundaries were set in 1299, although the boundaries returned to a smaller area as a result of King Charles I's actions. King Charles II took little interest in the forest and gave away or sold much of it. By 1792 there was no significant royal ownership of the forest area. Parliamentary enclosure of the bailiwicks and disafforestation of Rockingham bailiwick in 1832 resulted in a much smaller forest area with much of the land turned over to agriculture. The Forestry Commission took over the remnants of public woodland in 1923. The forest originally stretched from Stamford down to Northampton.

In 1562, timber was sent from the forest of Rockingham to the Master Carpenter John Revell for repairs at Collyweston Palace.

== Geology ==
The forest extends across a tract of country underlain by sedimentary rocks of Jurassic age, a part of the great Jurassic escarpment stretching from the Cotswolds to the southwest through the East Midlands to the Humber via Lincoln Edge. Largely a mix of mudstone and limestone layers dipping gently eastwards, the sequence is this (in stratigraphic order i.e. youngest/uppermost at top):

- Ancholme Group
  - Oxford Clay Formation
- Great Oolite Group
  - Cornbrash Formation
  - Blisworth Clay Formation
  - Blisworth Limestone Formation
  - Rutland Formation
- Inferior Oolite Group
  - Lincolnshire Limestone Formation
  - Grantham Formation
  - Northampton Sand Formation

The plateau is largely covered by glacial till of a stony, clayey nature. Exploitation of the ironstone within the Northampton Sands was the basis for the once-important iron and steel industry in Corby on the western edge of the forest.

== Management ==
Areas of Rockingham Forest managed by the Forestry Commission include:

- Southey Wood, Peterborough (Cambridgeshire)
- Wakerley Great Wood (Northamptonshire)
- Bedford Purlieus National Nature Reserve (Cambridgeshire)
- Fineshade Wood (Northamptonshire)
- Fermyn Woods (Northamptonshire)

It is famous for its population of red kites which now number 300.

== Chequered skipper reintroduction ==
In the spring of 2018, chequered skipper butterflies (Carterocephalus palaemon) from Belgium were released at a secret site, as part of the Back from the Brink (BftB) project. As of 2025, four releases have taken place with a total of 128 butterflies (107 females and 27 males). Invasive scrub has been removed from more than 8 km of woodland rides by Butterfly Conservation and their partners, and in 2019 native-born chequered skippers emerged in England for the first time in more than 40 years.

== See also ==
- List of forests in the United Kingdom
- List of ancient woods in England
