= Grafton Regis Meadow =

Nature reserve in United Kingdom

Coordinates: 52.113°N 0.885°W

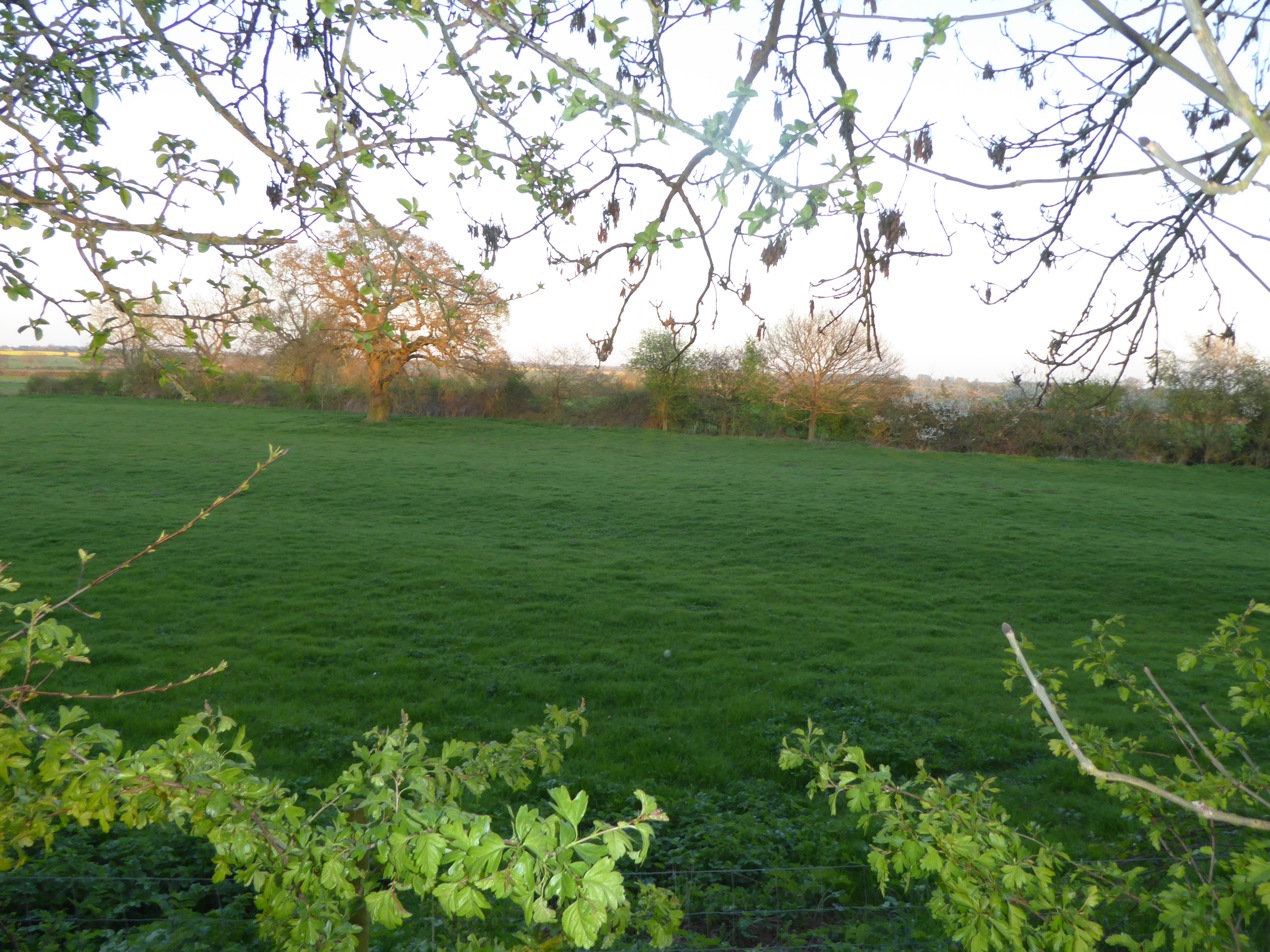
- Interactive map of Grafton Regis Meadow
- Type: Nature reserve
- Location: Grafton Regis, Northamptonshire
- OS grid: SP 771 463
- Area: 2 hectares (4.9 acres)
- Manager: Wildlife Trust for Bedfordshire, Cambridgeshire and Northamptonshire

Grafton Regis Meadow is a 2-hectare (4.9-acre) nature reserve east of Grafton Regis in Northamptonshire. It is managed by the Wildlife Trust for Bedfordshire, Cambridgeshire and Northamptonshire.

This is a traditionally managed hay meadow on the bank of the Grand Union Canal. Birds visiting the site include curlews, lapwings, long-tailed tits, bullfinches, yellowhammers and wrens.

There is no public access to the site.
