= Raveley Wood =

Nature reserve in Cambridgeshire, England

Coordinates: 52.419°N 0.172°W

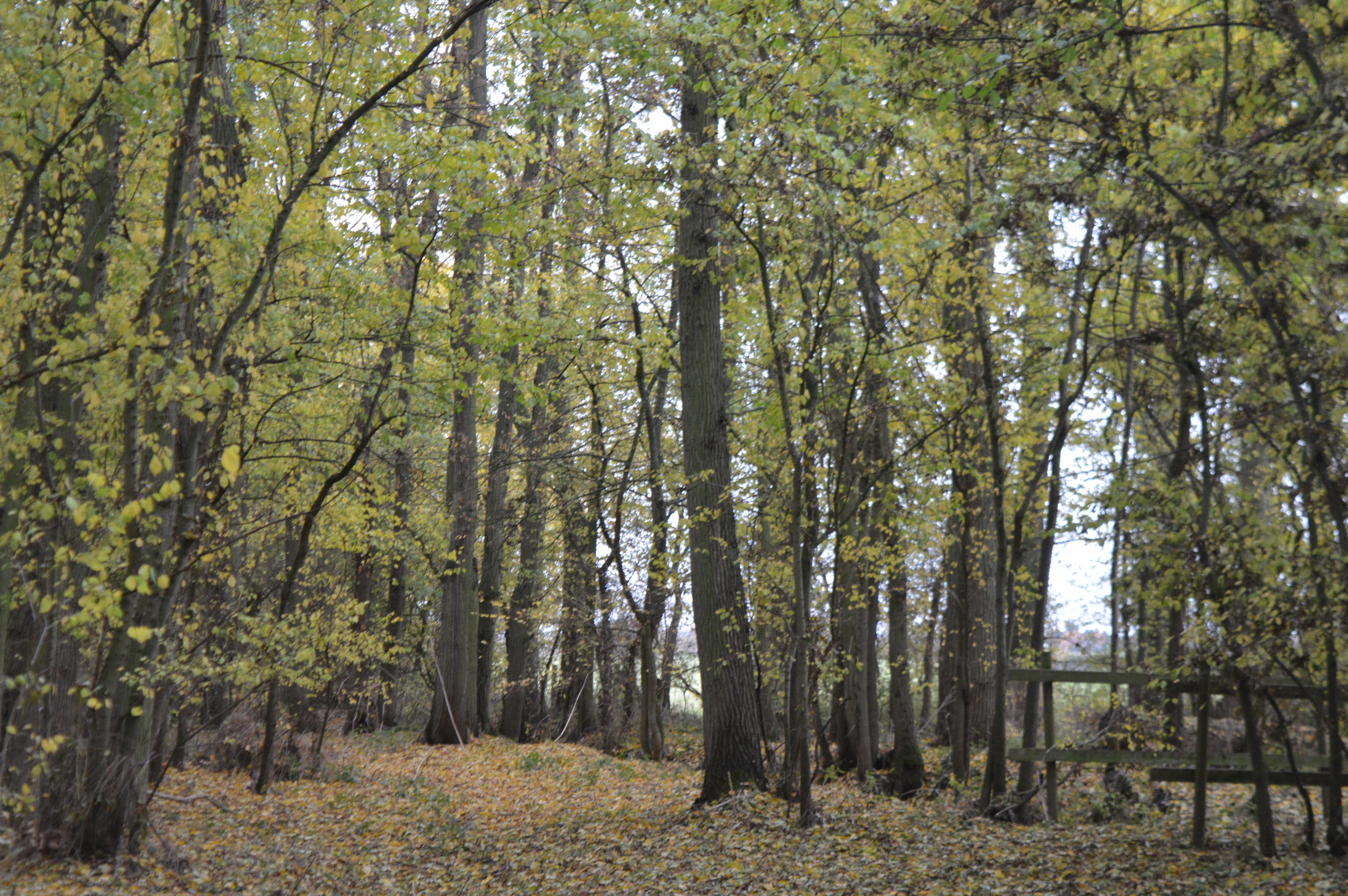
- Interactive map of Raveley Wood
- Type: Nature reserve
- Location: Upwood, Cambridgeshire
- OS grid: TL 244 817
- Area: 5.6 hectares (14 acres)
- Manager: Wildlife Trust for Bedfordshire, Cambridgeshire and Northamptonshire

Raveley Wood is a 5.6-hectare (14-acre) nature reserve south-west of Upwood in Cambridgeshire. It is managed by the Wildlife Trust for Bedfordshire, Cambridgeshire and Northamptonshire.

Trees in this wood include oak, ash and field maple, together with some elms, although many were killed by Dutch elm disease. Invertebrates include the rare white-spotted pinion moth, which depends on elms for food for its larvae, and white-letter hairstreak butterflies. The dead elms provide a habitat for a wide variety of fungi.

There is access from Raveley Road, which runs west from the hamlet of Great Raveley.
