= Godmanchester Nature Reserve =

Nature reserve in Cambridgeshire, England

Coordinates: 52.329°N 0.154°W

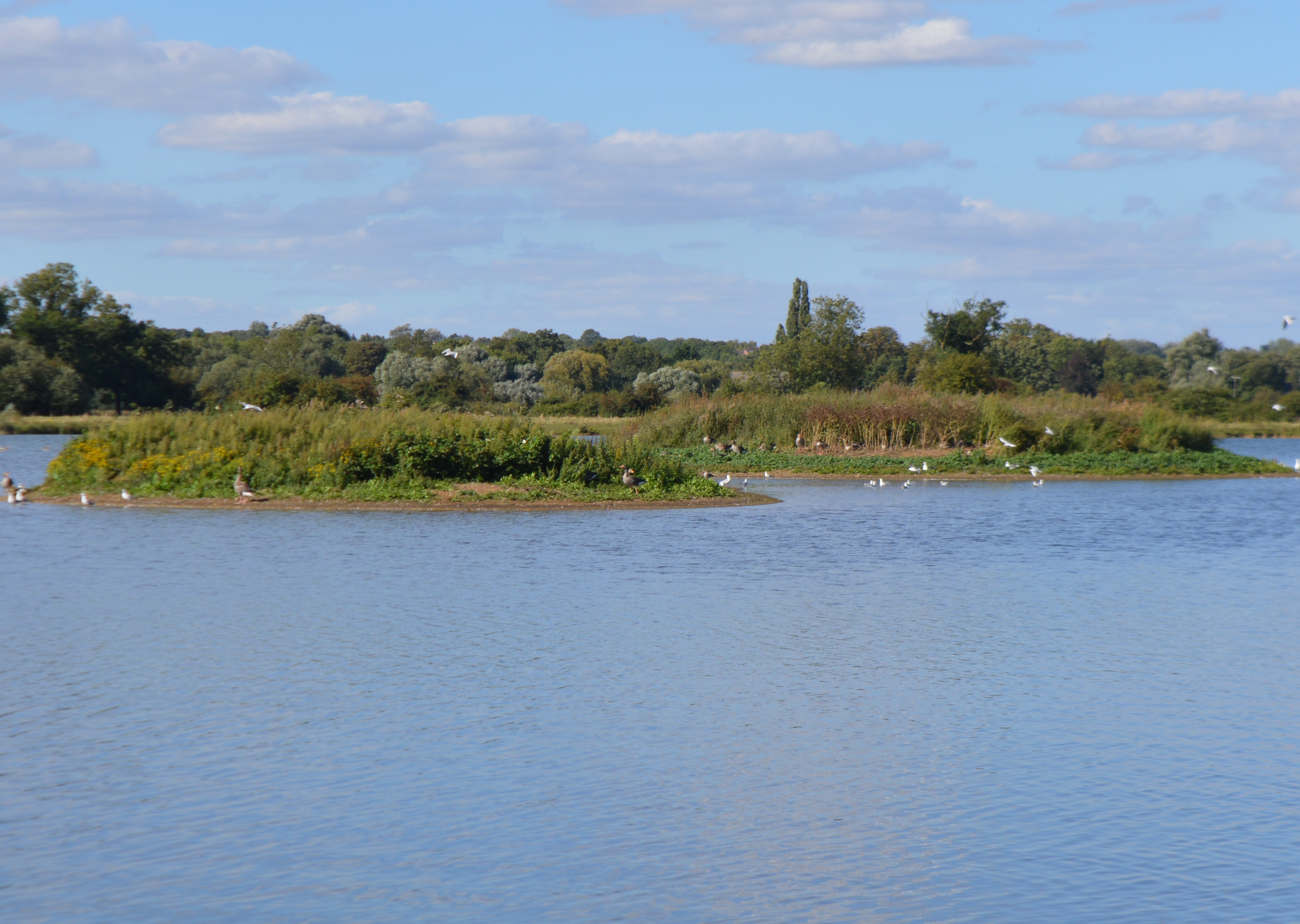
- Interactive map of Godmanchester Nature Reserve
- Type: Nature reserve
- Location: Godmanchester, Cambridgeshire, England
- OS grid: TL258717
- Area: 59 hectares (150 acres)
- Manager: Wildlife Trust for Bedfordshire, Cambridgeshire and Northamptonshire

Godmanchester Nature Reserve is a 59-hectare nature reserve in Godmanchester in Cambridgeshire, England. It is managed by the Wildlife Trust for Bedfordshire, Cambridgeshire and Northamptonshire.

The site has four former gravel pits which are now lakes, together with areas of grassland, willow woodland and reedbeds. Birds include wigeons, tufted ducks, teals and great crested grebes, and there are insects such as dragonflies and butterflies.

There is access to Island Lake and Roman Lake, but not to Peter Prince Memorial and Teddy's Lake. The Ouse Valley Way runs along the western edge.
