= Glapthorn Cow Pasture =

Nature reserve in Northamptonshire, England

Coordinates: 52.504°N 0.525°W

- Site of Special Scientific Interest
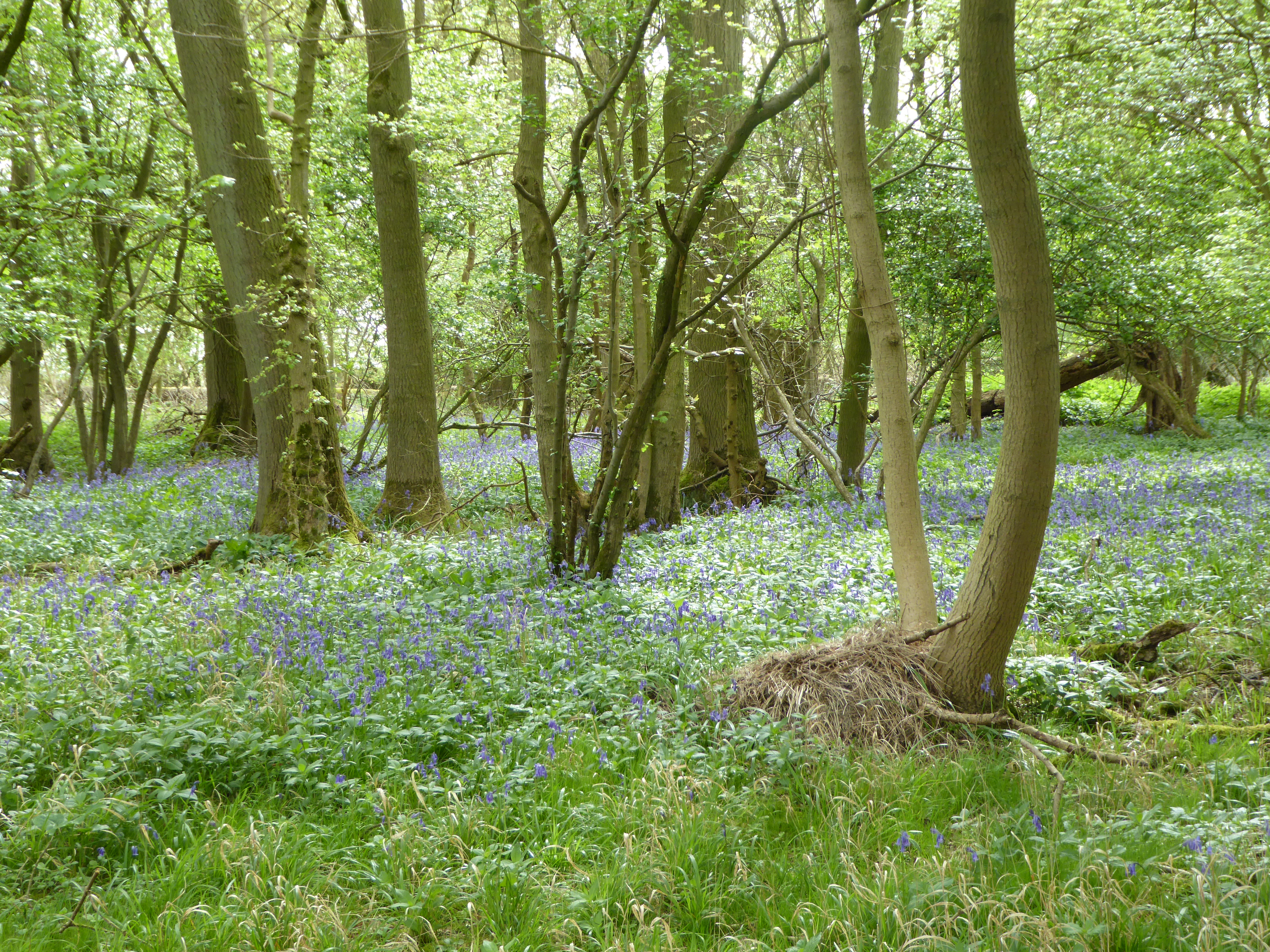
- Location of Glapthorn Cow Pasture.
- Area of search: Northamptonshire
- Grid reference: TL 002 905
- Interest: Biological
- Area: 28.2 hectares
- Notification date: 1986
- Location map: Magic Map

Glapthorn Cow Pasture is a 28.2-hectare (70-acre) biological Site of Special Scientific Interest north-west of Oundle in Northamptonshire. It is managed by the Wildlife Trust for Bedfordshire, Cambridgeshire and Northamptonshire.

This site has ash and maple woodland, and dense blackthorn scrub. It is described by Natural England as one of the most important sites in Britain for the black hairstreak butterfly, which requires a habitat of prunus species such as blackthorn. The scrub also provides nesting sites for nightingales.

There is an entrance to the site at the south-east corner.
