= Wildlife Trust for Bedfordshire, Cambridgeshire and Northamptonshire =

Charity in Bedfordshire, Cambridgeshire and Northamptonshire

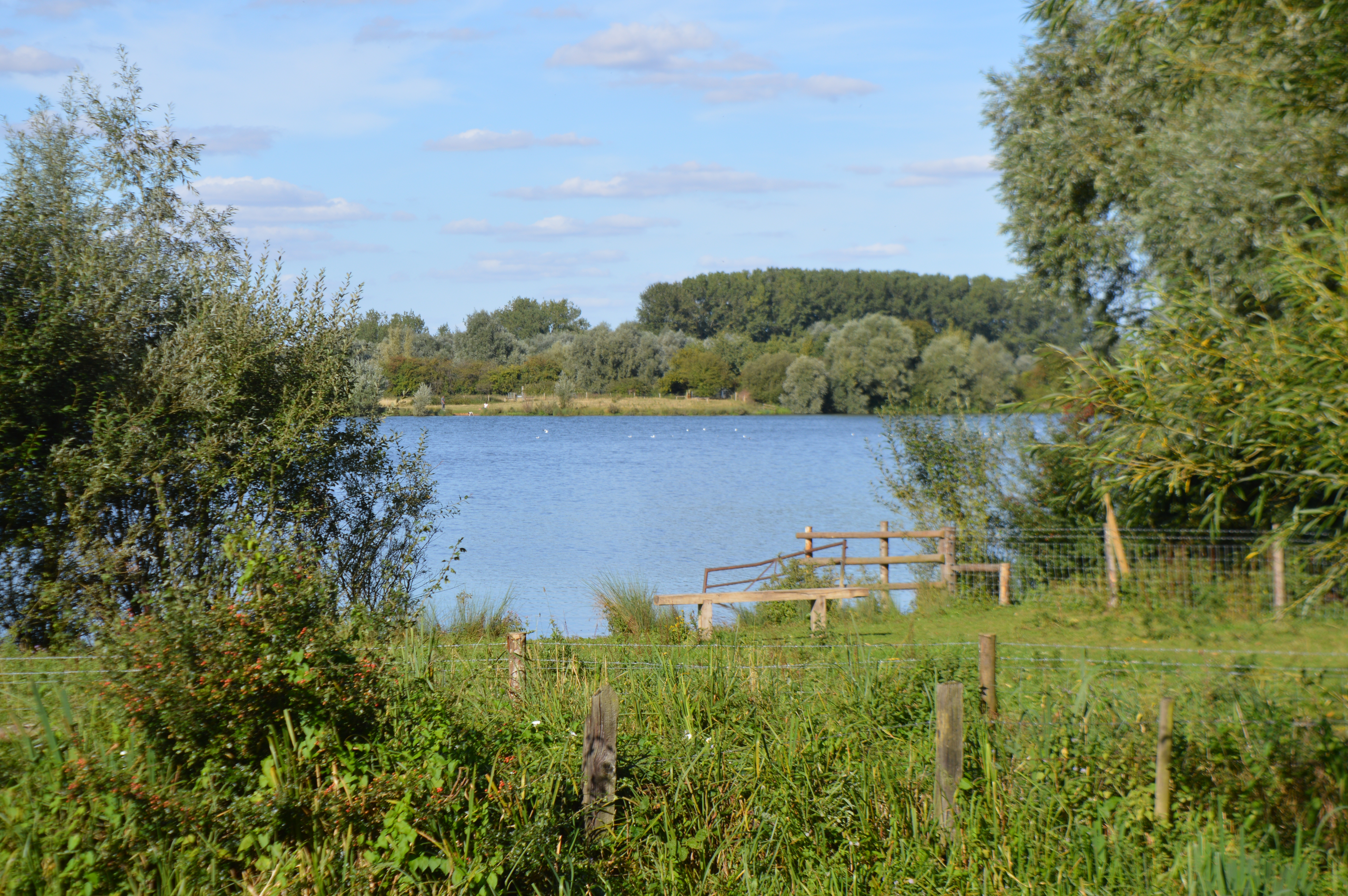
- Island Lake on Godmanchester Nature Reserve
- Abbreviation: WTBCN
- Predecessor: Cambridgeshire and Isle of Ely Naturalists’ Trust; Bedfordshire and Huntingdonshire Wildlife Trust; Peterborough Wildlife Group
- Formation: 1994; 32 years ago
- Founded at: England
- VAT ID no.: GB287907546
- Legal status: Charity
- Purpose: Nature conservation
- Headquarters: Cambridge, England
- Region served: Bedfordshire; Cambridgeshire; Northamptonshire; Peterborough
- Members: 35,000+ (2017)
- Revenue: £5.1 million (2016)
- Staff: 105 (2016)
- Website: www.wildlifebcn.org
- Formerly called: Wildlife Trust for Bedfordshire, Cambridgeshire and Northamptonshire and Peterborough

The Wildlife Trust for Bedfordshire, Cambridgeshire and Northamptonshire (WTBCN) is a registered charity which manages 126 nature reserves covering 3,945 hectares (15.23 square miles). It has over 35,000 members, and 95% of people in Bedfordshire, Cambridgeshire and Northamptonshire live within five miles of a reserve. As of 31 March 2016 it employed 105 people and had an income of £5.1 million. It aims to conserve wildlife, inspire people to take action for wildlife, offer advice and share knowledge. The WTBCN is one of 36 wildlife trusts covering England, and 46 covering the whole of the United Kingdom.

In 1912 Charles Rothschild formed the Society for the Promotion of Nature Reserves to protect sites considered "worthy of preservation". The society worked to secure statutory protection, and this began with the National Parks and Access to the Countryside Act 1949. In 1959 the society took on a coordinating role for local wildlife trusts, which covered the whole of Britain and Northern Ireland by 1978. The society changed its name to the Royal Society of Wildlife Trusts in 2004, and it operates as The Wildlife Trusts.

In 1956 the Cambridgeshire and Isle of Ely Naturalists’ Trust was founded, and it was followed by the Bedfordshire and Huntingdonshire Wildlife Trust in 1961, the Northamptonshire Wildlife Trust in 1963, and the Peterborough Wildlife Group in 1987. The Bedfordshire and Cambridgeshire trusts merged in 1990, and a further merger produced the Wildlife Trust for Bedfordshire, Cambridgeshire and Northamptonshire and Peterborough in 1994. Peterborough was dropped from the name (but still covered by the trust) in 2011.

Fifty-two reserves are Sites of Special Scientific Interest (SSSI), six are Ramsar wetland sites of international importance, six are Special Protection Areas under the European Union Directive on the Conservation of Wild Birds, two are national nature reserves, four are Nature Conservation Review sites, one is a Special Area of Conservation, two are in the Chilterns Area of Outstanding Natural Beauty, one is a Geological Conservation Review site and eighteen are local nature reserves. The largest site is Ouse Washes at 186 hectares (460 acres), which is internationally significant for wintering and breeding wildfowl and waders. The smallest, at 0.7 hectares (1.7 acres), are Chettisham Meadow and Stoke Wood End Quarter, both of which are SSSIs.

== Nature reserves ==
=== Key ===
==== Designations ====
- CAONB = Chilterns Area of Outstanding Natural Beauty
- GCR = Geological Conservation Review
- LNR = Local nature reserve
- NCR = Nature Conservation Review
- NNR = National nature reserve
- Ramsar = Ramsar wetland site of international importance
- SAC = Special Area of Conservation
- SPA = Special Protection Area under the European Union Directive on the Conservation of Wild Birds
- SSSI = Site of Special Scientific Interest

==== Public access ====
- NO = No public access
- PP = Public access to part of the site
- WTPR = Wildlife Trust permit required for access
- YES = Public access to all or most of the site

=== Bedfordshire reserves ===
Site	Photograph	Area (Note: The area and location are taken from the Wildlife Trust page for each site.)	Location	Public access	Designations	Description
Arlesey Old Moat and Glebe Meadows	Arlesey Old Moat	4.3 hectares (11 acres)	Arlesey; 52.021°N 0.269°W; TL189373	YES		Frogs, toads and newts spawn in the moat, and dragonflies lay their eggs in it. The meadows have a range of wild flowers, and woodland, which is managed by coppicing, provides a habitat for nesting warblers.
Barton Gravel Pit	Barton Gravel Pit	1.1 hectares (2.7 acres)	Barton-le-Clay; 51.957°N 0.403°W; TL098299	YES		This former gravel pit has been partially filled in to become flower-rich chalk grassland. Plants include knotted hedge-parsley, common poppy and great pignut. Mature beech trees provide a habitat for the white helleborine orchid.
Begwary Brook	Begwary Brook	0.8 hectares (2.0 acres)	Begwary; 52.194°N 0.290°W; TL169564	YES		Gravel extraction has created a small lake and several smaller pools and marshland. The pools are surrounded by willow trees, and plants include common fleabane and marsh woundwort. Dragonflies and damselflies are common over the marsh in the summer.
Blow's Downs	Blow's Downs	62.3 hectares (154 acres)	Dunstable; 51.887°N 0.490°W; TL040220	YES	SSSI	The site has varied habitats with a large area of unimproved grassland, which cattle help to maintain. Features include a disused quarry and medieval cultivation terraces. It has a nationally rare plant, Bunium bulbocastanum, and a nationally rare beetle, Odonteus armiger.
Cooper's Hill	Cooper's Hill	12.5 hectares (31 acres)	Ampthill; 52.027°N 0.503°W; TL028376	YES	SSSI	The site is described by Natural England as the best surviving example in Bedfordshire of heathland on the thin acidic soils of the Lower Greensand Ridge. It also has areas of marsh and woodland.
Cople Pits	Cople Pits	2.0 hectares (4.9 acres)	Cople; 52.130°N 0.390°W; TL103492	YES		The site has eleven long water-filled pits from gravel extraction in the 1930s, which are now surrounded by willow and hawthorn scrub. The pits have been colonised by aquatic plants. Fauna include dragonflies, kingfishers and woodpeckers, and there is also a wildflower meadow.
Cut-throat Meadow	Cut-throat Meadow	1.5 hectares (3.7 acres)	Ampthill; 52.032°N 0.485°W; TL039380	YES		The reserve is in three separate areas. There is a steeply sloping meadow where meadow saxifrage and field woodrush flower in the spring, a beech and scots pine wood, and a pond which has reedmace and celery-leaved buttercup, and water boatmen and pond skaters on the surface.
Dropshort Marsh	Dropshort Marsh	2.0 hectares (4.9 acres)	Toddington; 51.938°N 0.537°W; TL007276	YES	SSSI	This marsh has a variety of habitats, including a scarce quaking bog. Many species are now uncommon due to changes in agricultural practices. it has several springs, with floating sweet-grass and brooklime and areas dominated by rushes.
Fancott Woods and Meadows	Fancott Woods and Meadows	12.9 hectares (32 acres)	Fancott; 51.937°N 0.510°W; TL025275	YES	SSSI	The meadows are mainly ancient ridge and furrow, and are unimproved neutral grassland traditionally managed for hay and grazing. The woodland is mainly ash, with other species including pedunculate oak and alder. There is also a small pond.
Felmersham Gravel Pits	Felmersham Gravel Pits	21.0 hectares (52 acres)	Felmersham; 52.215°N 0.551°W; SP991584	YES	SSSI	The site has flooded gravel pits, neutral grassland, scrub and broadleaved woodland. It is described by the Wildlife Trust as one of the best sites in Bedfordshire for dragonflies and damselflies.
Flitwick Moor (& Folly Wood)	Flitwick Moor	66.6 hectares (165 acres)	Flitwick; 52.007°N 0.477°W; TL046354	YES	SSSI	This is a rich valley mire, and the largest area of wetland in Bedfordshire. Eight species of sphagnum bog moss have been recorded, including one which is nationally rare. There are areas of woodland as well as wet grassland.
King's Wood and Rammamere Heath	King's Wood	104.0 hectares (257 acres)	Heath and Reach; 51.956°N 0.663°W; SP920294	YES	SSSI NNR	The site has the largest remaining area of woodland in Bedfordshire, together with lowland heath, acidic grassland and some small ponds. There are a number of rare plant species, including great woodrush, wood vetch and saw-wort.
Lancot Meadow	Lancot Meadow	2.0 hectares (4.9 acres)	Dunstable; 51.885°N 0.544°W; TL003217	YES		The site is a grassland remnant on chalk soil, and a remnant of flower-rich meadows in the area. Flora include common spotted-orchids, ox-eye daisies and bird's foot trefoils. There are fauna such as song thrushes and marbled white butterflies.
Landpark Wood	Landpark Wood	3.6 hectares (8.9 acres)	Whipsnade; 51.855°N 0.526°W; TL016184	YES		This wood has mature beech trees, hornbeam, oak and ash. The understorey is hazel and hawthorn, with bluebells, yellow archangel and woodruff. Birds include woodpeckers and nuthatches.
Old Warden Tunnel	Old Warden Tunnel	3.8 hectares (9.4 acres)	Old Warden; 52.089°N 0.376°W; TL113446	YES		The site has oak and ash woodland with mature blackthorn and hawthorn bushes, and a steep cutting with grassland and scrub. Flowers include dwarf thistle and pyramidal orchid, and the scrub provides nesting sites for birds.
Pavenham Osier Beds	Pavenham Osier Beds	1.3 hectares (3.2 acres)	Pavenham; 52.185°N 0.553°W; SP990551	YES		This wet meadow next to the River Great Ouse has the uncommon flower meadow-rue. Osier is a type of willow which is continually cut, stimulating its growth and supplying material for basket weavers. The Trust is continuing the tradition by planting more osiers.
Pegsdon Hills and Hoo Bit	Pegsdon Hills	79.0 hectares (195 acres)	Pegsdon; 51.953°N 0.372°W; TL120295	YES	SSSI, CAONB	The site has wildflower meadows in chalk hills, including orchids and moschatels. There are butterflies such as dingy and grizzled skippers, Birds include wheatears and skylarks, and herbs such as marjoram and wild thyme. Hoo Bit is a flower meadow surrounded by woodland.
The Riddy	The Riddy	7.7 hectares (19 acres)	Sandy; 52.125°N 0.296°W; TL165487	YES	LNR	This is one of the few surviving water meadows in the flood plain of the River Ivel. Aquatic plants include celery leaved buttercup and water plantain, and there are birds such as lapwings, fieldfares and redwings. Water voles are found along the river.
Sallowsprings	Sallowsprings	1.3 hectares (3.2 acres)	Whipsnade; 51.854°N 0.538°W; TL008183	YES		This site was formerly a caravan park, and it is now a traditional hay meadow. A rich variety of flowers includes common knapweed, bluebells and cowslips. An ancient hedgerow has diverse shrubs such as holly.
Sewell Cutting	Sewell Cutting	3.6 hectares (8.9 acres)	Dunstable; 51.894°N 0.547°W; TL005226	YES		The banks of this former railway cutting provide a rich habitat for chalk grassland flowers, such as common spotted orchids and cowslips. The south-facing slope has deep rooted plants such as hawkweed and scabious, while the sheltered north-facing slope has lush grasses. There are many species of butterflies.
Sharnbrook Summit	Sharnbrook Summit	9.0 hectares (22 acres)	Sharnbrook; 52.250°N 0.577°W; SP972622	YES		The site is a mile long narrow strip above a rail tunnel. The reserve is grassland, grazed by rabbits, on limestone deposited during the construction of the railway. The dominant plant is tor-grass, and flowers include dyer's greenweed and wild liquorice. Scattered scrub provides food and shelter from kestrels and buzzards for small mammals and nesting birds.
Totternhoe	Totternhoe Knolls	31.0 hectares (77 acres)	Totternhoe; 51.885°N 0.569°W; SP986217	YES	SSSI, LNR, CAONB,	Part of the site was formerly quarry workings for Totternhoe Stone, a strong chalk that was used in Westminster Abbey. It is now grassland with a rich variety of plant species, including some that are now rare. There are a number of orchids and a wide variety of invertebrates, including butterflies such as the common blue, chalkhill blue, and the scarce small blue and Duke of Burgundy.
Wymington Meadow	Wymington Meadow	1.0 hectare (2.5 acres)	Wymington; 52.259°N 0.596°W; SP958632	YES		The site is a triangular meadow in the corner where two railway lines merge. It was cut off when the railways were constructed in the 1850s, and at the northern end there are traces of the medieval ridge and furrow method of ploughing. The site has a wide range of flowers, such as cowslip, salad burnet and quaking grass. A small stream and hedgerows provide additional habitats for wildlife.

=== Cambridgeshire reserves ===
Site	Photograph	Area	Location	Public access	Designations	Description
Arthur's Meadow	Arthur's Meadow	0.8 hectares (2.0 acres)	Hemingford Grey; 52.306°N 0.108°W; TL292692	YES	SSSI	The site is calcareous clay pasture with a wide variety of plant species, including the herbs oxeye daisy and yellow rattle. There are orchids such as common twayblades and common spotteds.
Beechwoods	Beechwoods	10 hectares (25 acres)	Cambridge; 52.171°N 0.170°E; TL485547	YES	LNR	Beeches were planted on chalky farmland in the 1840s, and medieval plough terraces are still visible. Birds include green and great spotted woodpeckers, and nuthatches.
Brampton Wood	Brampton Wood	132 hectares (330 acres)	Brampton; 52.316°N 0.27°W; TL184698	YES	SSSI	This is one of the few surviving areas of ancient woodland in the county. It is wet ash and maple on heavy clay soil, with rides which have a varied grassland flora, such as yellow pimpernel, greater bird's-foot-trefoil and devil's-bit scabious.
Cambourne	Cambourne Nature Reserve	90 hectares (220 acres)	Cambourne; 52.218°N 0.075°W; TL316595	YES		This site has woodland, lakes, ponds, grassland and an orchard. The lakes and ponds have water voles and great crested newts, and birds include skylarks and corn buntings.
Cherry Hinton Chalk Pits	Cherry Hinton Chalk Pits	11 hectares (27 acres)	Cambridge; 52.18°N 0.168°E; TL483557	YES	LNR, SSSI	The two parts of the site are both former chalk quarries. East Pit is surrounded by steep walls of chalk, and the base is wildflower grassland with areas of scrub. Flowers include millkwort, harebell, kidney vetch and the rare moon carrot, which is on the British Red List of Threatened Species. Quarrying ceased 200 years ago in Limekiln Close, and it is now steeply sloping mature woodland with ash and cherry trees.
Chettisham Meadow	Chettisham Meadow	0.7 hectares (1.7 acres)	Chettisham; 52.423°N 0.265°E; TL541830	YES	SSSI	The site is grassland on calcareous clay, and evidence survives of ridge and furrow medieval farming. Flowering plants include adder's tongue, cowslip and the uncommon green-winged orchid.
Doghouse Grove	Doghouse Grove	0.8 hectares (2.0 acres)	Wilburton; 52.349°N 0.172°E; TL480745	YES		In the medieval period this was a series of monastic fishponds, which can still be seen in wetter periods. It is now an ash wood, with flowers including bluebells and lords-and-ladies.
Dogsthorpe Star Pit	Dogsthorpe Star Pit	37.2 hectares (92 acres)	Peterborough; 52.608°N 0.21°W; TF213026	YES	LNR, SSSI	This former brick pit has been designated an SSSI mainly for its invertebrates, especially its water beetles, with 64 species, including four on the IUCN Red List of Threatened Species, Graptodytes bilineatus, Dryops similaris, Gyrinus distinctus and Myopites inulaedyssentericae.
Fordham Woods	Fordham Woods	10 hectares (25 acres)	Fordham; 52.304°N 0.392°E; TL632700	YES	SSSI	This wet woodland site has semi-natural alder coppice, with ash, crack willow and silver birch. The ground flora has tall fens, together with herbs such as marsh marigold and yellow flag.
Fulbourn Fen	Fulbourn Fen	31 hectares (77 acres)	Fulbourn; 52.178°N 0.230°E; TL526557	YES	SSSI	These are ancient meadows on calcareous loam and peat which have never been farmed, so they have a rich diversity of flora and fauna. Herbs in drier areas include cowslip and salad burnet, while wetter areas have tall fen vegetation.
Gamlingay Cinques	Gamlingay Cinques	3.4 hectares (8.4 acres)	Gamlingay; 52.161°N 0.209°W; TL226529	YES		This site is on dry sandy soil, which is an unusual habitat in the county. Grazing by sheep helps to restore the acid grassland and prevent encroachment by woodland and scrub. flora include slender St John's wort, harebell and devil's bit scabious.
Gamlingay Wood	Gamlingay Wood	70 hectares (170 acres)	Gamlingay; 52.167°N 0.187°W; TL240537	YES	SSSI	This is ancient ash/maple woodland on sandy loam soil, an unusual habitat in lowland England. Ground flora include dog's mercury, yellow archangel, wood anemone and the nationally restricted oxlip. The flora is diverse due to the varied soils, and there are hundreds of species of mushrooms and toadstools. Birds include barn owls, garden warblers and blue tits. The site also includes Sugley Wood, which is young woodland.
Gamsey Wood	Gamsey Wood	4 hectares (9.9 acres)	Woodwalton; 52.419°N 0.201°W; TL225 816	YES		The main trees in this wood are ash and field maple, but there are also several wild service trees. Spring flowers include bluebells, wood anemones and yellow archangels, and there are birds such as fieldfares and nightingales.
Godmanchester	Godmanchester Nature Reserve	59 hectares (150 acres)	Godmanchester; 52.329°N 0.154°W; TL258717	PP		The site has four former gravel pits which are now lakes, together with areas of grassland, willow woodland and reedbeds. Birds include wigeons, tufted ducks, Eurasian teals and great crested grebes, and there are insects such as dragonflies and butterflies.
Grafham Water	Grafham Water	114 hectares (280 acres)	Grafham; 52.290°N 0.326°W; TL143 671	YES	SSSI	Grafham Water is a reservoir, and the nature reserve is at its western end. It has open water, woodland, grassland and reedbeds. Around 170 bird species have been recorded including greylag geese, mallards and rare birds such as ospreys.
Great Fen	Great Fen	1,184 hectares (2,930 acres) (Note: The figure for the area of Great Fen includes parts managed by Natural England. The figure for the area managed by the Trust is not available.)	Holme; 52.486°N 0.224°W; TL207890	PP		This is a large wetland project which covers national nature reserves run by Natural England, and areas managed by the trust. The fields of New Decoy Farm are being made wildlife friendly with new ditches and scrapes, and grazing cattle. Rymes Reedbeds is also being restored with new reedbeds on open water. Kesters Docking is being sown as species-poor grassland, and it will also have areas of open water and reedbeds.
Hardwick Wood	Hardwick Wood	15 hectares (37 acres)	Caldecote; 52.204°N 0.0172°W; TL356580	YES	SSSI	This medieval wood is now managed by coppicing. It is mainly ash and field maple, while the oldest parts have pedunculate oak with an understorey of hazel and hawthorn, while ground flora include early-purple orchid and yellow archangel.
Hayley Wood	Hayley Wood	52 hectares (130 acres)	Great Gransden; 52.160°N 0.113°W; TL292530	YES	NCR, SSSI	The soil in this wood is heavy and often waterlogged, conditions which suit meadowsweet and oxlip. The numbers of oxlip declined from around 2 million to 250,000 due to the pressure of excessive numbers of deer, but they have revived since the construction of a fence in 2002. A parish boundary fence is estimated to date from the eleventh century or earlier, and the site has high wildlife value.
Houghton Meadows	Houghton Meadows	8 hectares (20 acres)	Houghton; 52.328°N 0.104°W; TL293717	YES	SSSI	Some of these fields are pasture and others are hay meadows, and they display ridges and furrows from medieval ploughing. They are a type of neutral grassland which is declining nationally. Flowers include cowslips and yellow-rattles, and there are fauna such as green woodpeckers and great crested newts.
Lady's Wood	Lady's Wood	7.1 hectares (18 acres)	Upwood; 52.427°N 0.173°W; TL243826	YES		This wood was a traditional coppice, but many of the trees were cut down in the 1950s. Birds include blackcaps, fieldfares and green woodpeckers and there are invertebrates such as orange-tip butterflies and azure damselflies.
Lattersey	Lattersey	11.3 hectares (28 acres)	Whittlesey; 52.552°N 0.111°W; TL282966	YES	LNR	This former clay brick quarry has pits which have filled with water, and it has diverse habitats of grassland, woodland, scrub, pools, marshes and reedbeds. Mammals includes water voles, water shrews, and there are birds such as sedge warblers, tawny owls, woodcocks, great spotted woodpeckers and reed buntings.
Lower Wood	Lower Wood	9 hectares (22 acres)	Weston Colville; 52.150°N 0.374°E; TL625528	YES		This ancient woodland has a variety of flora such as oxlips and early-purple orchids in the spring and water avens and germander speedwells in the summer. Muntjac and roe deer use the site and birds include goldcrests, great spotted woodpeckers and tawny owls.
Norwood Road	Norwood Road	2.6 hectares (6.4 acres)	March; 52.561°N 0.089°E; TL417980	YES		This site has a deep pond, marshland and hawthorn scrub. There are wetland birds such as coots, moorhens and mallards, and other wildlife includes noctule bats and weasels.
Ouse Washes	Ouse Washes	186 hectares (460 acres)	Little Downham; 52.452°N 0.162°E; TL470860	YES	NCR, Ramsar, SAC, SPA, SSSI	The Washes are internationally significant for wintering and breeding wildfowl and waders, especially teal, pintails, wigeons, shovelers, pochards and Bewick's swans. The site also has rich aquatic fauna and flora, and areas of unimproved grassland.
Overhall Grove	Overhall Grove	17 hectares (42 acres)	Knapwell; 52.250°N 0.043°W; TL337631	YES	NCR, SSSI	This site is the largest elm woodland in the county. It was seriously affected by Dutch elm disease, but many trees have regenerated from their bases, and the mixture of new growth and dead wood provides a very good habitat for insects and birds.
Pingle Cutting	Pingle Cutting	1.0 hectare (2.5 acres)	Warboys; 52.417°N 0.070°W; TL313816	YES		This former railway cutting has grassland with ox-eye daisy, salad burnet, wild carrot and hairy violet. There is also woodland with forest plants such as bluebells and dog's mercury. Over 50 bird and 300 moth species have been recorded.
Raveley Wood	Raveley Wood	5.6 hectares (14 acres)	Upwood; 52.419°N 0.172°W; TL244817	YES		Trees in this wood include oak, ash and field maple, together with some elms, although many were killed by Dutch elm disease. Invertebrates include the rare white-spotted pinion moth, which depends on elms for food for its larvae, and white-letter hairstreak butterflies. The dead elms provide a habitat for a wide variety of fungi.
Shepherd's Close	Shepherd's Close	1.2 hectares (3.0 acres)	Spaldwick; 52.323°N 0.339°W; TL133707	YES		This small wood was planted in 1984 with ash, field maple and oak. Birds include blackcaps and chiffchaffs, and there are peacock, orange-tip and speckled wood butterflies.
Shepreth L Moor	Shepreth L Moor	7.3 hectares (18 acres)	Shepreth; 52.108°N 0.021°E; TL385475	YES	SSSI	This is unploughed calcareous grassland which has diverse flora such as horseshoe vetch and felwort in drier areas, and devil's bit scabious and fen bedstraw in wetter ones. The site is regarded by Natural England as valuable for its invertebrates.
Skaters' Meadow	Skaters' Meadow	2 hectares (4.9 acres)	Cambridge; 52.192°N 0.105°E; TL440569	NO		The meadow is flower-rich wet grassland. Flora include common spotted orchids, cuckooflowers, meadowsweets, marsh-marigolds and ragged-robins. There are also grass snakes and birds such as blackcaps.
Soham Meadow	Soham Meadow	3.6 hectares (8.9 acres)	Soham; 52.329°N 0.360°E; TL609727	YES	SSSI	This site is neutral grassland with diverse fauna and flora, including uncommon ones. Wetter areas have herbs such as green-winged orchids and adder's tongue fern, and there are cowslips and stemless thistles in drier parts. Snipe breed in wet pastures.
Southorpe Meadow	Southorpe Meadow	2.0 hectares (4.9 acres)	Southorpe; 52.615°N 0.402°W; TF083031	YES	SSSI	This is one of the few surviving areas of neutral grassland in the county, where ridge and furrow from medieval ploughing can be seen. There is a rich variety of species, such as red fescue in drier areas, and salad burnet in damper ones.
Southorpe Paddock	Southorpe Paddock	1.6 hectares (4.0 acres)	Southorpe; 52.607°N 0.401°W; TF084022	YES	SSSI	This site is a rare example of unimproved grassland on the Jurassic limestone of eastern England. It has typical limestone plants such as purple milk-vetch and clustered bellflower. Mature hedgerows provide additional habitats for wildlife.
Stanground Newt Ponds	Stanground Newt Ponds	0.8 hectares (2.0 acres)	Peterborough; 52.549°N 0.229°W; TL202961	YES		This site has ponds and a wet meadow, with smooth and great crested newts. Other fauna include common frogs, damselflies and dragonflies.
Stanground Wash	Stanground Wash	26 hectares (64 acres)	Peterborough; 52.562°N 0.219°W; TL208975	NO		The site is sandwiched between the East Coast Main Line railway line and Back River, a tributary of the River Nene. It is grassland which is flooded in winter, providing a refuge for waterbirds, and is grazed in the summer. It has a variety of birds such as lapwings, snipe, redshanks and skylarks, and ditches with rare beetles.
Thorpe Wood	Thorpe Wood	10 hectares (25 acres)	Peterborough; 52.571°N 0.292°W; TL158983	YES		This is ancient woodland on heavy clay, with mature oak and ash trees, and an understorey of hazel and field maple. The ground flora is diverse, including wild garlic, wood anemones and bluebells.
Trumpington Meadows	Trumpington Meadows	58 hectares (140 acres)	Trumpington; 52.170°N 0.103°E; TL439545	YES		This site has flower meadows, woodland, ponds, and is adjacent to the River Cam and Byron's Pool, where Lord Byron once swam. Fauna include otters, brown hares, muntjac deer, skylarks, lapwings, yellowhammers and meadow pipits.
Upwood Meadows	Upwood Meadows	6 hectares (15 acres)	Upwood; 52.426°N 0.162°W; TL251825	YES	NCR, NNR, SSSI	The site has three fields on calcareous clay with poor drainage, a type of pasture now very rare, and was described by Derek Ratcliffe as having "an outstandingly rich and diverse flora". Other habitats are mature hedgerows, ponds and scrub. One of the fields is agriculturally unimproved, and the evidence of medieval ridge and furrow still survives. Flowering plants include pepper saxifrage and green-winged orchid.
Wansford Pasture & Standen's Pasture	Wansford Pasture	7.3 hectares (18 acres)	Wansford; 52.582°N 0.424°W; TL069994	YES	SSSI	This is a south-facing slope, with Jurassic limestone grassland and a flush lower down which has a wide variety of wet-loving plants, including some which are rare in the county. The ecology is maintained by avoiding the use of fertilisers and herbicides, and by grazing.
Waresley and Gransden Woods	Waresley Wood	50 hectares (120 acres)	Waresley; 52.177°N 0.157°W; TL261548	YES	SSSI	This ancient woodland is mainly ash, field maple and hazel. There are also rides with diverse flora such as the herbs bush vetch, meadowsweet, greater burnet-saxifrage and self-heal.
Wistow Wood	Wistow Wood	8.5 hectares (21 acres)	Wistow; 52.421°N 0.096°W; TL296820	YES	SSSI	This wood has many old ash coppices, most of which were cut at ground level in the 1920s and left to re-grow. There are flowering plants such as meadowsweet and ragged-robin, and butterflies include purple hairstreaks and red admirals.
Woodston Ponds	Woodston Ponds	10 hectares (25 acres)	Peterborough; 52.566°N 0.268°W; TL175979	YES	LNR	The site was formerly settling ponds to remove washings from sugar beets. The east side has a lake with water birds such as grey herons, tufted ducks and pochards. In the west there is a reedbed which has pools and channels, with great crested newts and unusual species of water beetle.
Woodwalton Marsh	Woodwalton Marsh	1 hectare (2.5 acres)	Woodwalton; 52.414°N 0.219°W; TL212811	YES	SSSI	This grassland on calcareous clay has diverse flora, including red fescue, quaking grass, knapweed, cowslip, pepper saxifrage, green-winged orchid and the rare sulphur clover. There is also a wide variety of butterflies.

=== Northamptonshire reserves ===
Site	Photograph	Area	Location	Public access	Designations	Description
Abington Meadows	Abington Meadows	9.6 hectares (24 acres)	Northampton; 52.240°N 0.843°W; SP 791 608	YES		This is marshy grassland which has diverse wildlife, and 421 species of invertebrates have been recorded. Flora include great burnet, purple loosestrife and the nationally rare pennyroyal. There are birds such as snipe.
Barford Wood and Meadows	Barford Wood and Meadows	36.0 hectares (89 acres)	Rushton; 52.434°N 0.739°W; SP 858 825	YES	SSSI	This was formerly part of the medieval Royal Forest of Rockingham. It has diverse habitats, with hay meadows, parkland and recently planted woodland. There are many butterflies such as large skippers, orange-tips, small skippers and small coppers. Mammals include badgers and red foxes.
Barnes Meadow	Barnes Meadow	20.0 hectares (49 acres)	Northampton; 52.230°N 0.874°W; SP 770 597	YES	LNR	The site includes a stretch of the River Nene, meadows and a redundant arm of the river. There are many dragonflies including brown hawkers, and a large population of grass snakes. Birds include grey herons, kingfishers and great crested grebes.
Boddington Meadow	Boddington Meadow	2.3 hectares (5.7 acres)	Boddington; 52.174°N 1.280°W; SP 494 531	YES		This meadow has never been ploughed and it is managed in a traditional way to encourage uncommon plants, such as great burnet and pepper-saxifrage. There are amphibians including frogs and toads, and butterflies including meadow browns, orange-tips, peacocks, ringlets and small tortoiseshells.
Bradlaugh Fields	Bradlaugh Fields	17.5 hectares (43 acres)	Northampton; 52.268°N 0.880°W; SP 765 639	YES	LNR	Bradlaugh Fields nature reserve consists of three fields which are part of the 60 hectare Bradlaugh Fields wildlife park, which is named after the leading radical and atheist, Charles Bradlaugh, who was MP for Northampton. It has ancient hedgerows and unimproved grassland. Birds include blue tits, chiffchaffs, great spotted woodpeckers, sparrowhawks, redwings and fieldfares.
Bugbrooke Meadow	Bugbrooke Meadow	1.7 hectares (4.2 acres)	Nether Heyford; 52.222°N 1.018°W; SP 672 586	YES	SSSI	This is a field on the bank of the River Nene which has not been treated with fertilisers, and often floods in winter. It has very diverse damp grassland flora such as hard rush, jointed rush and greater pond sedge. There are ancient hedges are important both as a habitat for wildlife and historically.
Collyweston Quarries	Collyweston Quarries	8.0 hectares (20 acres)	Easton on the Hill; 52.623°N 0.519°W; TF 003 038	YES	SSSI	This former limestone quarry is now rough grassland on Jurassic limestone. The flora is diverse, and more than a hundred flowering plants have been recorded, including wild thyme, dropwort, dyer's greenweed and clustered bellflower. There is a substantial butterfly population.
Ditchford Lakes and Meadows	Ditchford Lakes and Meadows	31.1 hectares (77 acres)	Higham Ferrers; 52.300°N 0.638°W; SP 930 678	YES	Ramsar, SPA, SSSI	This site has lakes in old gravel pits which are used by wintering and breeding birds such as Cetti's warblers, coots, oystercatchers and grey herons. The lakes are also visited by otters. There are areas of grassland and willow scrub.
Duston Mill Meadow	Duston Mill Meadow	1.0 hectare (2.5 acres)	Northampton; 52.231°N 0.933°W; SP 729 597	YES		This wet meadow on the bank of the River Nene is described by the Trust as important for dragonflies and butterflies. It has muddy areas where wading birds such as snipe and the uncommon water rail feed on invertebrates.
Farthinghoe	Farthinghoe	4.0 hectares (9.9 acres)	Farthinghoe; 52.059°N 1.246°W; SP 518 403	YES	LNR	This former landfill site has grassland, ponds and woodland. Flowers include lady's bedstraw, meadow vetchling and snake's-head fritillary. There are fauna such as marbled white and green-veined white butterflies, and pipistrelle and noctule bats.
Finedon Cally Banks	Finedon Cally Banks	2.5 hectares (6.2 acres)	Wellingborough; 52.331°N 0.678°W; SP 902 712	YES		The site was formerly used to burn ironstone to remove impurities, leaving a layer of calcine, which produces poor soil in which wildflowers flourish. The reserve also includes a stretch of railway embankment for transporting the iron ore. Flora include common spotted orchids, great reedmace, kidney vetch and meadowsweet.
Glapthorn Cow Pastures	Glapthorn Cow Pasture	28.0 hectares (69 acres)	Oundle; 52.500°N 0.519°W; TL 006 902	YES	SSSI	This site has ash and maple woodland, and dense blackthorn scrub. It is described by Natural England as one of the most important sites in Britain for the black hairstreak butterfly, which requires a habitat of Prunus species such as blackthorn. The scrub also provides nesting sites for nightingales.
Grafton Regis Meadow	Grafton Regis Meadow	2.0 hectares (4.9 acres)	Towcester; 52.113°N 0.885°W; SP 771 463	NO		This is a traditionally managed hay meadow on the bank of the Grand Union Canal. Birds visiting the site include curlews, lapwings, long-tailed tits, bullfinches, yellowhammers and wrens.
Great Oakley Meadow	Great Oakley Meadow	2.0 hectares (4.9 acres)	Great Oakley; 52.462°N 0.731°W; SP 863 856	YES	LNR	The prominent medieval ridge and furrow at the southern end of the site displays the ancient field system of Great Oakley. The dry ridges have diverse flora including cowslip, knapweed and quaking-grass. The furrows are poorer in species, while the northern end, which borders Harpers Brook, has plants characteristic of wet ground, such as cuckooflower and hairy sedge. The field is bordered by hedges, which provide seeds and insects for birds.
Harlestone Heath	Harlestone Heath	2.6 hectares (6.4 acres)	Northampton; 52.275°N 0.945°W; SP 721 646	YES		The site is two narrow strips on either side of the Northampton loop railway line between Northampton and Rugby, with a tunnel connecting the strips. A stream runs along the north-east boundary. It is acid heathland, which is rare in the county. Birds include green woodpeckers and siskins, and there are butterflies such as brown arguses and speckled woods.
High Wood and Meadow	High Meadow	16.5 hectares (41 acres)	Daventry; 52.188°N 1.134°W; SP 593 548	YES	SSSI	The wood is ancient and semi-natural on acid soils. It has diverse ground flora, including yellow pimpernel, hairy wood-rush and broad-leaved helleborine. The meadow is acid grassland of a type which is now uncommon, and there are also areas of neutral grassland and marsh on silty peat. There are many ant hills of the yellow meadow ant.
Higham Ferrers Pits	Higham Ferrers Pits	10.0 hectares (25 acres)	Higham Ferrers; 52.309°N 0.609°W; SP 949 688	YES	Ramsar, SPA, SSSI	This narrow strip of grassland next to the River Nene is a refuge for breeding and wintering birds such as little grebes, shovelers, reed warblers, gadwalls and reed buntings. There are diverse damselflies and dragonflies.
Irthlingborough Lakes and Meadows	Irthlingborough Lakes and Meadows	117.0 hectares (289 acres)	Irthlingborough; 52.318°N 0.608°W; SP 950 698	YES	Ramsar, SPA, SSSI	This reserve on the banks of the River Nene has wintering golden plovers, wigeons and gadwalls, and there are invertebrates such as banded demoiselle damselflies and common darter dragonflies. Meadows have grass snakes, and pipistrelle and noctule bats hunt insects at night.
King's Wood	King's Wood	32.0 hectares (79 acres)	Corby; 52.476°N 0.726°W; SP 866 872	YES	LNR	More than 250 plant species have been recorded at this remnant of the Royal Forest of Rockingham, including ones characteristic of ancient woods including yellow archangel and wood anemone. There are diverse invertebrates such as green-veined white butterflies and common blue damselflies, and birds include treecreepers, long-tailed tits, green woodpeckers and tawny owls.
Kingsthorpe Meadow	Kingsthorpe Meadow	15.0 hectares (37 acres)	Northampton; 52.257°N 0.908°W; SP 746 627	YES	LNR	This site on the Brampton arm of the River Nene is often flooded in the winter. There are hedges and ponds, together with areas of scrub. Birds include green woodpeckers, kestrels and snipe.
Lings	Lings	18.5 hectares (46 acres)	Northampton; 52.267°N 0.825°W; SP 803 639	YES	LNR	Frogs, newts, damselflies and dragonflies breed in this nature reserve, which has woodland, ponds, scrub and grassland. There are plantations of sweet chestnut and douglas fir, but in some areas native woodland is regenerating naturally.
Mill Crook	Mill Crook	5.9 hectares (15 acres)	Towcester; 52.110°N 0.876°W; SP 771 463	WTPR	SSSI	Signs of medieval ridge and furrow still survive on this traditionally hay meadow on the bank of the River Tove. It has diverse flora, with grasses such as meadow foxtail and sweet vernal-grass, and herbs including great burnet and ribwort plantain.
Old Sulehay	Old Sulehay	85.0 hectares (210 acres)	King's Cliffe; 52.574°N 0.434°W; TL 062 985	YES	SSSI	This ancient forest has a number of different soil conditions and coppice types, and the ground flora is diverse. Abundant herbs include dog's mercury, bracken, bramble, ramsons, wood anemone and bluebells.
Pitsford Water	Pitsford Water	181.0 hectares (447 acres)	Brixworth; 52.322°N 0.847°W; SP 787 699	WTPR	SSSI	This reservoir has been designated an SSSI mainly because of its many wildfowl, and the Trust manages the northern end for wildlife. In summer, falling water levels expose mud which provides feeding grounds for migrating waders, and winter visitors include wigeons, gadwall, pintails and teals.
The Plens	The Plens	5.0 hectares (12 acres)	Desborough; 52.447°N 0.811°W; SP 809 839	YES		Former use as a quarry and a railway line have created steep slopes and varied habitats, with grassland, hawthorn scrub, woodland and herbs. Flowers include wild basil, bladder campion, moschatel and bird's-foot-trefoil. There is a diverse range of invertebrates, particularly butterflies.
Ramsden Corner	Ramsden Corner	3.2 hectares (7.9 acres)	Weedon Bec; 52.203°N 1.089°W; SP 623 564	YES	SSSI	A stream runs through this valley site, which is acidic grassland, woodland and scrub on clay and sand. Plants such as wood millet, wood-sorrel and wood vetch are indicators of ancient woodland. Opposite-leaved golden-saxifrage is found in wet flushes.
Rothwell Gullet	Rothwell Gullet	1.6 hectares (4.0 acres)	Rothwell; 52.428°N 0.815°W; SP 807 818	YES		This former ironstone quarry has woodland, grassland and damp undergrowth with fungi. Hart's-tongue fern lines the quarry walls, and mammals include badgers and red foxes. A patch of privet provides a habitat for butterflies such as small heaths and green hairstreaks.
Short Wood and Southwick Wood	Southwick Wood	54.7 hectares (135 acres)	Oundle; 52.51°N 0.49°W; TL 023 914	YES	SSSI	The site is a small remnant of the medieval royal hunting Rockingham Forest. Short Wood is ancient semi-natural woodland with the dominant trees being ash and pedunculate oak. Flora include several local rarities such as wood speedwell, bird's nest orchid and greater butterfly orchid. Southwick Wood lost its elms in the late 1960s due to Dutch elm disease, and it now has oak, ash, field maple and hazel.
Southfield Farm Marsh	Southfield Farm Marsh	2.8 hectares (6.9 acres)	Barton Seagrave; 52.374°N 0.700°W; SP 886 759	YES	SSSI	The wetland has tall plants such as lesser pond-sedge and slender tufted-sedge, which provides cover for reed buntings and sedge warblers. Mammals include otters, and there are birds such as red kites and buzzards. Purple loosestrife is found in grassland areas.
Stoke Bruerne Brick Pits	Stoke Bruerne Brick Pits	6.0 hectares (15 acres)	Stoke Bruerne; 52.139°N 0.914°W; SP 744 495	YES		This former brickworks was opened at the end of the eighteenth century for the construction of the Grand Junction Canal, and is on its bank. There are diverse habitats with grassland, ponds, a reed bed and a redundant arm of the canal. Invertebrates include white-legged damselflies and there are a variety of small mammals which provide food for barn owls.
Stoke Wood End Quarter	Stoke Wood End Quarter	0.7 hectares (1.7 acres)	Corby; 52.465°N 0.724°W; SP 800 859	YES	SSSI	The main trees in this wood are oak, ash, hazel and blackthorn. There are flowers such as early purple orchid and twayblade, birds including treecreepers and tawny owls, while comma and small tortoiseshell butterflies feed in open glades in summer.
Storton's Pits	Storton's Pits	22.0 hectares (54 acres)	Northampton; 52.234°N 0.930°W; SP 732 600	YES	LNR	This site on the bank of the River Nene has old gravel pits, meadow and fen ditch. Around 350 invertebrate species have been recorded, including some which are rare. Water birds include snipe, teal, tufted duck and the uncommon water rail.
Summer Leys	Summer Leys	47.0 hectares (116 acres)	Wollaston; 52.261°N 0.733°W; SP 866 633	YES	LNR, Ramsar, SPA SSSI,	This wetland site has flooded gravel pits with bird hides, grassland, hedges and water meadows. Breeding birds include golden plovers, ringed plovers and common terns. There are butterflies such as common blues and the uncommon brown argus.
Tailby Meadow	Tailby Meadow	5.0 hectares (12 acres)	Desborough; 52.437°N 0.804°W; SP 814 828	YES	LNR	Artificial fertilisers have never been used on this hay meadow, and it has not been ploughed for several hundred years. There are fifteen species of grass and diverse wild flowers, including black knapweed, lady's bedstraw and lady's smock, which is a food source for the orange tip butterfly.
Titchmarsh	Titchmarsh	72.0 hectares (178 acres)	Thrapston; 52.420°N 0.522°W; TL 006 812	YES	LNR	The River Nene runs through this site, which also has large areas of open water and grassland. There are nationally important numbers of goosanders, wigeons and gadwalls in winter, and banded demoiselle damselflies nest on nettles along the river bank.
Wicksteed Park	Wicksteed Park	14.2 hectares (35 acres)	Barton Seagrave; 52.385°N 0.703°W; SP 884 771	PP		This site is in two areas, Wicksteed Water Meadows and Castle Field. Water meadows are deliberately flooded for agricultural purposes, unlike flood meadows which are naturally under water when river levels are high. Flora include great burnet and marsh marigold, and there are also grass snakes.
Wilson's Pits	Wilson's Pits	32.0 hectares (79 acres)	Higham Ferrers; 52.302°N 0.617°W; SP 944 680	YES (Note: As of March 2017, Wilson's Pits is closed while roadworks are carried out.)	Ramsar, SPA, SSSI	This site has three lakes in former gravel pits, and it also has areas of grassland and scrub. There are diverse bird species, and flora such as rageed-robin, brooklime, common spotted orchid and creeping jenny. Dragonflies include the brown hawker and black-tailed skimmer.
Woodford Halse	Woodford Halse	5.7 hectares (14 acres)	Woodford Halse; 52.161°N 1.215°W; SP 538 517	YES		This site in two disused railway cuttings has some plant species which are rare in Northamptonshire. Over 100 flower species have been recorded, including knapweed and devil's bit scabious. There are birds such as fieldfare, redwing, wheatear, lesser whitethroat, yellowhammer and linnet.

== See also ==
- Warren Villas

== Bibliography ==
- Ratcliffe, Derek, ed. (1977). A Nature Conservation Review. Vol. 2. Cambridge, UK: Cambridge University Press. ISBN 0521-21403-3.
