= Cambourne Nature Reserve =

Nature reserve in Cambridgeshire, England

Coordinates: 52.218°N 0.075°W

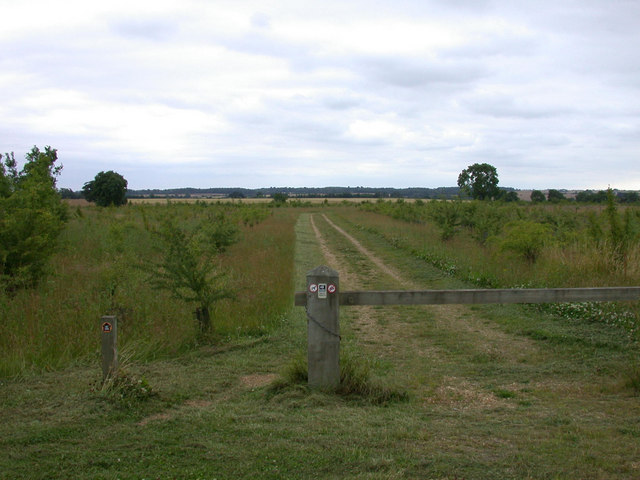
- Interactive map of Cambourne Nature Reserve
- Type: Nature reserve
- Location: Cambourne, Cambridgeshire
- OS grid: TL 316 595
- Area: 90 hectares (220 acres)
- Manager: Wildlife Trust for Bedfordshire, Cambridgeshire and Northamptonshire

Cambourne Nature Reserve is a 90 hectare nature reserve in Cambourne in Cambridgeshire. It is managed by the Wildlife Trust for Bedfordshire, Cambridgeshire and Northamptonshire.

This site has woodland, lakes, ponds, grassland and an orchard. The lakes and ponds have water voles and great crested newts, and birds include skylarks and corn buntings.

The reserve occupies several different areas around Cambourne with a number of entrances.
