= Higham Ferrers Pits =

Nature reserve in the Northamptonshire, England

Coordinates: 52.309°N 0.609°W

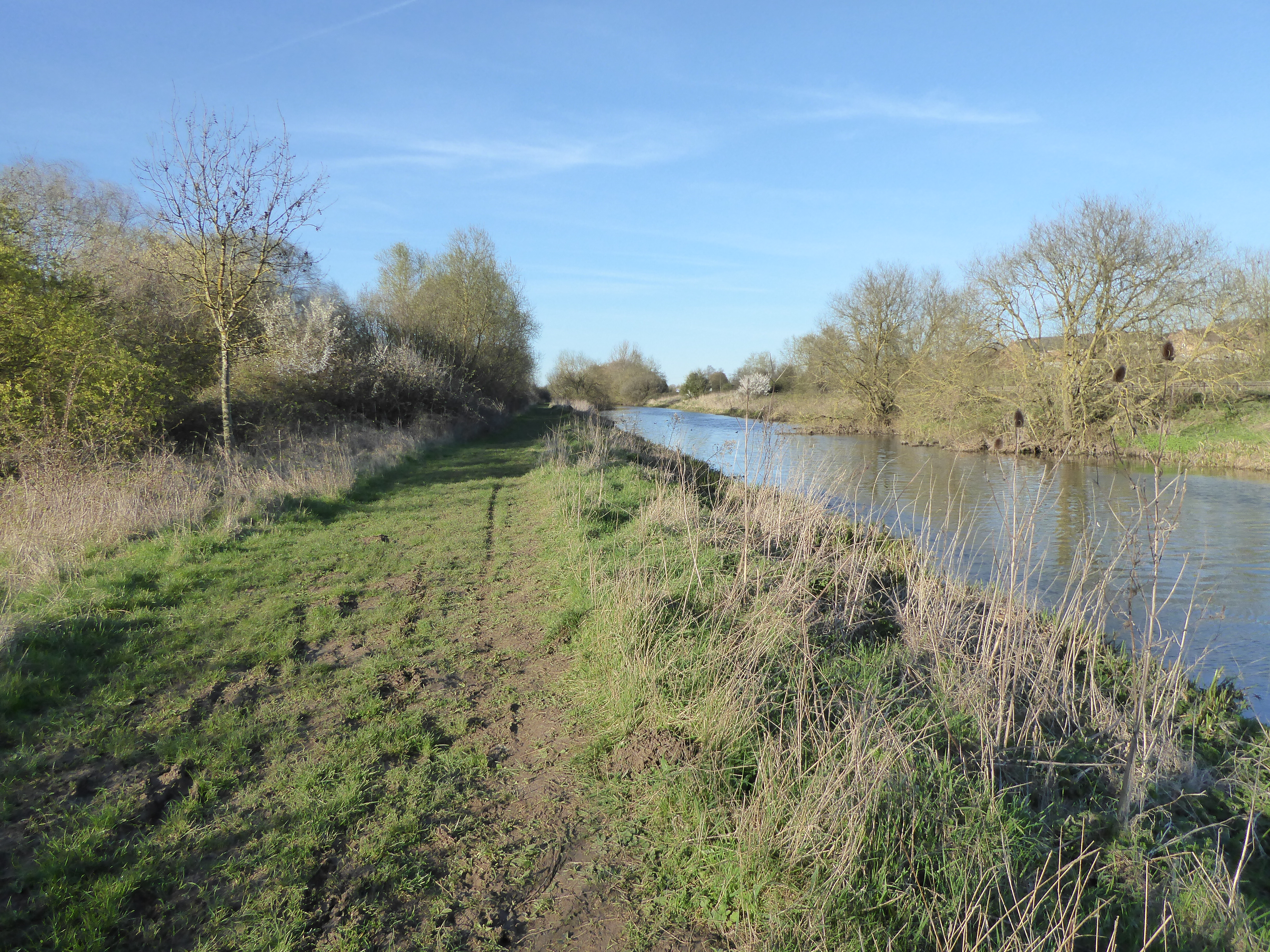
- Interactive map of Higham Ferrers Pits
- Type: Nature reserve
- Location: Higham Ferrers, Northamptonshire
- OS grid: SP 950 698
- Area: 10 hectares (25 acres)
- Manager: Wildlife Trust for Bedfordshire, Cambridgeshire and Northamptonshire

Higham Ferrers Pits is a 10 hectare nature reserve Northamptonshire. It is managed by the Wildlife Trust for Bedfordshire, Cambridgeshire and Northamptonshire. It is part of the Upper Nene Valley Gravel Pits Site of Special Scientific Interest, Ramsar internationally important wetland site and Special Protection Area under the EC Birds Directive.

This narrow strip of grassland next to the River Nene is a refuge for breeding and wintering birds such as little grebes, shovelers, reed warblers, gadwalls and reed buntings. There are diverse damselflies and dragonflies.

The Nene Way long distance footpath goes through the site.
