= Norwood Road =

Nature reserve in Cambridgeshire

Coordinates: 52.561°N 0.08895°E

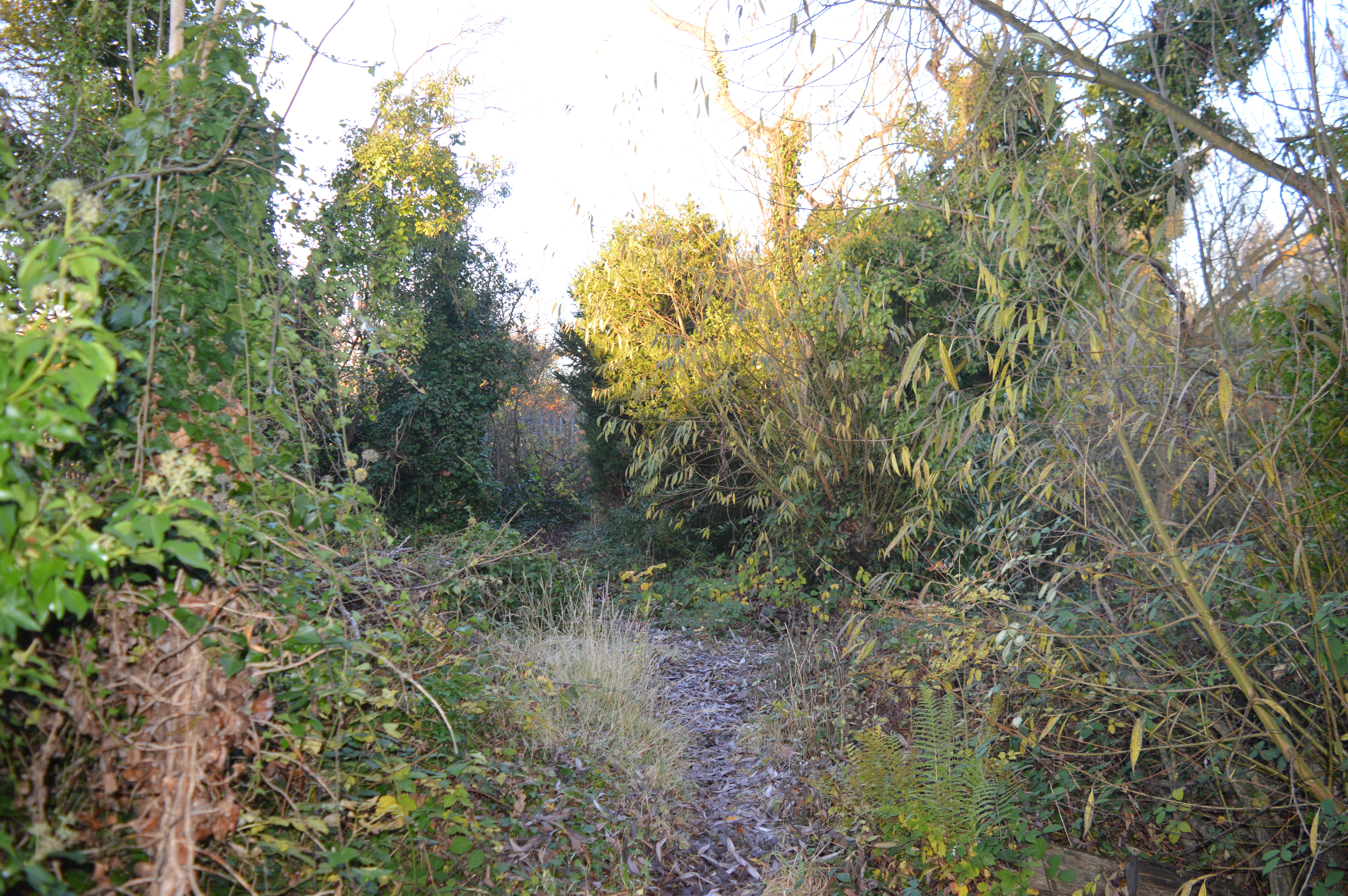
- Interactive map of Norwood Road
- Type: Nature reserve
- Location: March, Cambridgeshire
- OS grid: TL417980
- Area: 2.6 hectares (6.4 acres)
- Manager: Wildlife Trust for Bedfordshire, Cambridgeshire and Northamptonshire

Norwood Road is a 2.6-hectare (6.4-acre) nature reserve in March in Cambridgeshire. It is managed by the Wildlife Trust for Bedfordshire, Cambridgeshire and Northamptonshire.

This site has a deep pond, marshland and hawthorn scrub. There are wetland birds such as coots, moorhens and mallards, and other wildlife includes noctule bats and weasels.

There is access to the reserve from Norwood Road.
