= Abington Meadows =

Nature reserve in Northampton, England

Coordinates: 52.24°N 0.843°W

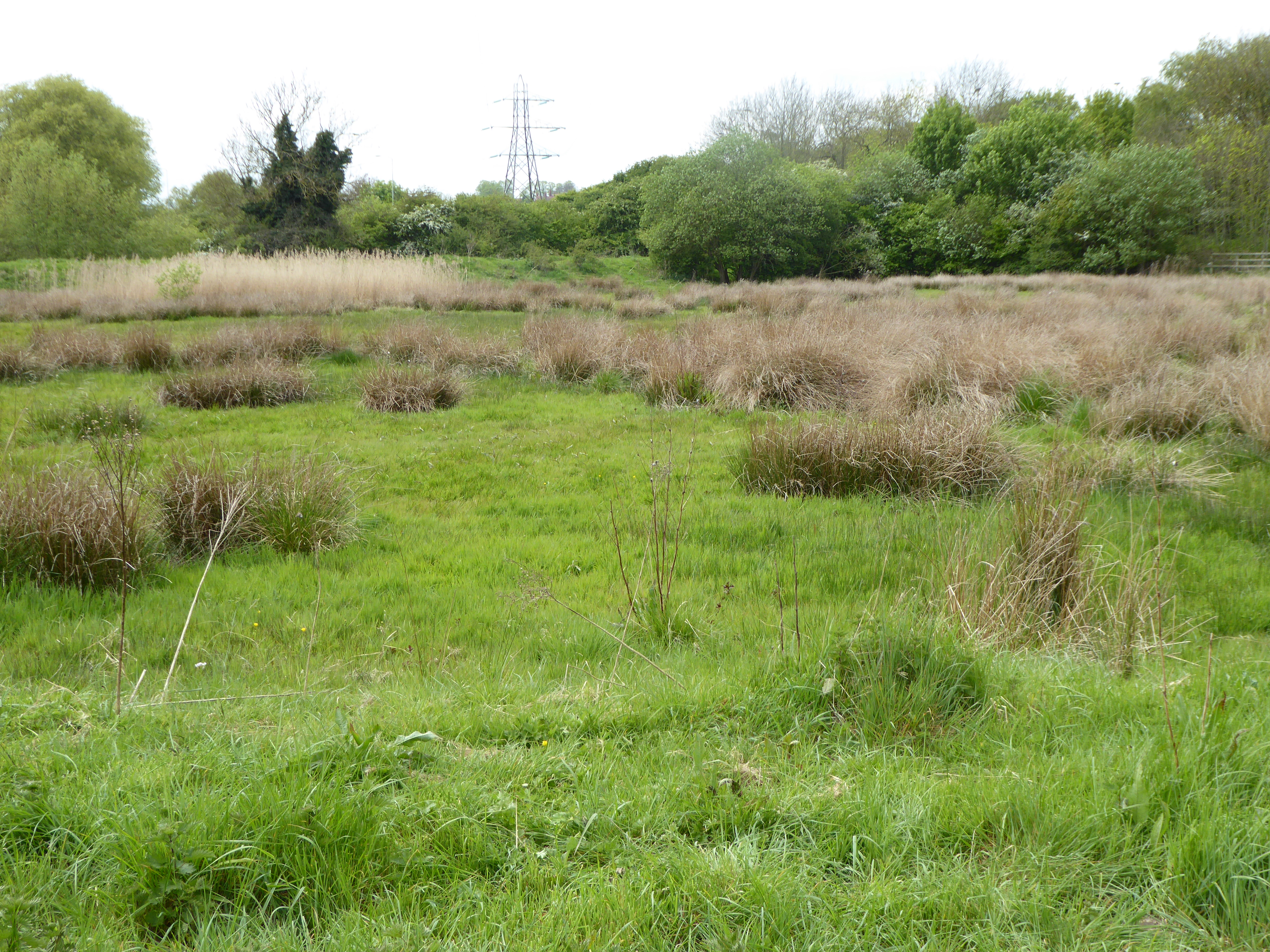
- Interactive map of Abington Meadows
- Type: Nature reserve
- Location: Northampton
- OS grid: SP 791 608
- Area: 9.6 hectares (24 acres)
- Manager: Wildlife Trust for Bedfordshire, Cambridgeshire and Northamptonshire

Abington Meadows is a 9.6-hectare (24-acre) nature reserve in Northampton. It is owned by Northamptonshire County Council and managed by the Wildlife Trust for Bedfordshire, Cambridgeshire and Northamptonshire.

This is marshy grassland with diverse wildlife. 421 species of invertebrates have been recorded, and flora include great burnet, purple loosestrife and the nationally rare pennyroyal. There are birds such as snipe.

There is access from Weston Mill Lane and the Nene Way footpath.
