= Warren Villas =

Nature reserve in Bedfordshire, England

Coordinates: 52.110044°N 0.274673°W

Warren Villas was a nature reserve managed by the Wildlife Trust for Bedfordshire, Cambridgeshire and Northamptonshire. The former site is situated by the River Ivel to the south of the town of Sandy in the county of Bedfordshire.

Archaeological work at the site recovered oak timbers dated by dendrochronology to the late 10th-12th centuries AD, adding historical interest.
