= Lings Wood Nature Reserve =

Nature reserve in Northampton, England

Coordinates: 52.267°N 0.825°W

Lings Wood
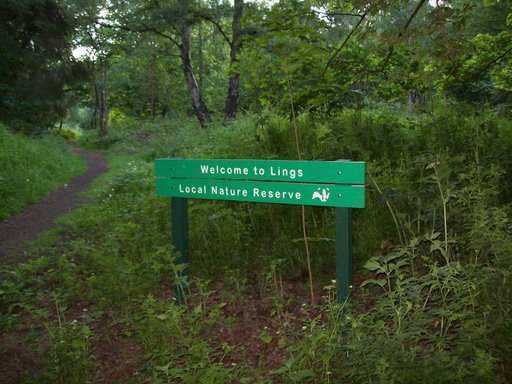
- Interactive map of Lings Wood
- Type: Local Nature Reserve
- Location: Northampton
- OS grid: SP 803 639
- Area: 20.1 hectares (50 acres)
- Manager: Wildlife Trust for Bedfordshire, Cambridgeshire and Northamptonshire

Lings Wood is a 20.1 hectare Local Nature Reserve in eastern Northampton. It is owned by Northampton Borough Council and managed by the Wildlife Trust for Bedfordshire, Cambridgeshire and Northamptonshire.

Frogs, newts, damselflies and dragonflies breed in this nature reserve, which has woodland, ponds, scrub and grassland. There are plantations of sweet chestnut and douglas fir, but in some areas native woodland is regenerating naturally.

There is access from Lings Way.
