= Kingsthorpe Meadow =

Nature reserve in Northampton, England

Coordinates: 52.257°N 0.91°W

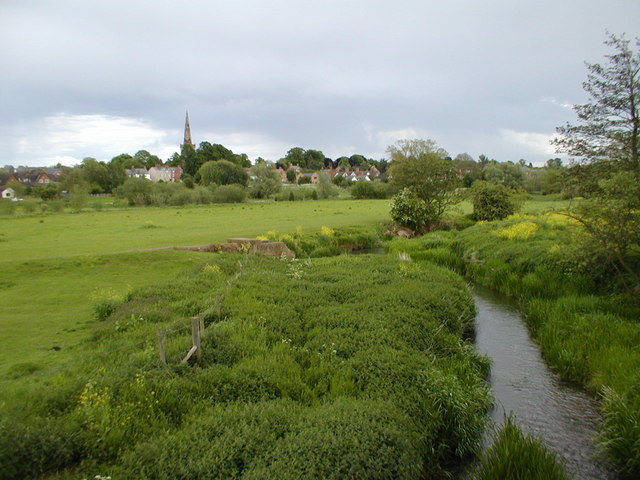
- Interactive map of Kingsthorpe Meadow
- Type: Local Nature Reserve
- Location: Northampton
- OS grid: SP 745 626
- Area: 14.4 hectares (36 acres)
- Manager: Wildlife Trust for Bedfordshire, Cambridgeshire and Northamptonshire

Kingsthorpe Meadow is a 14.4 hectare Local Nature Reserve in Northampton. It is owned by Northampton Borough Council and managed by the Wildlife Trust for Bedfordshire, Cambridgeshire and Northamptonshire.

This site on the Brampton arm of the River Nene is often flooded in the winter. There are hedges and ponds, together with areas of scrub. Birds include green woodpeckers, kestrels and snipe.

There is access from Mill Lane.
