= Harlestone Heath =

Nature reserve in Northamptonshire, England

Coordinates: 52.275°N 0.945°W

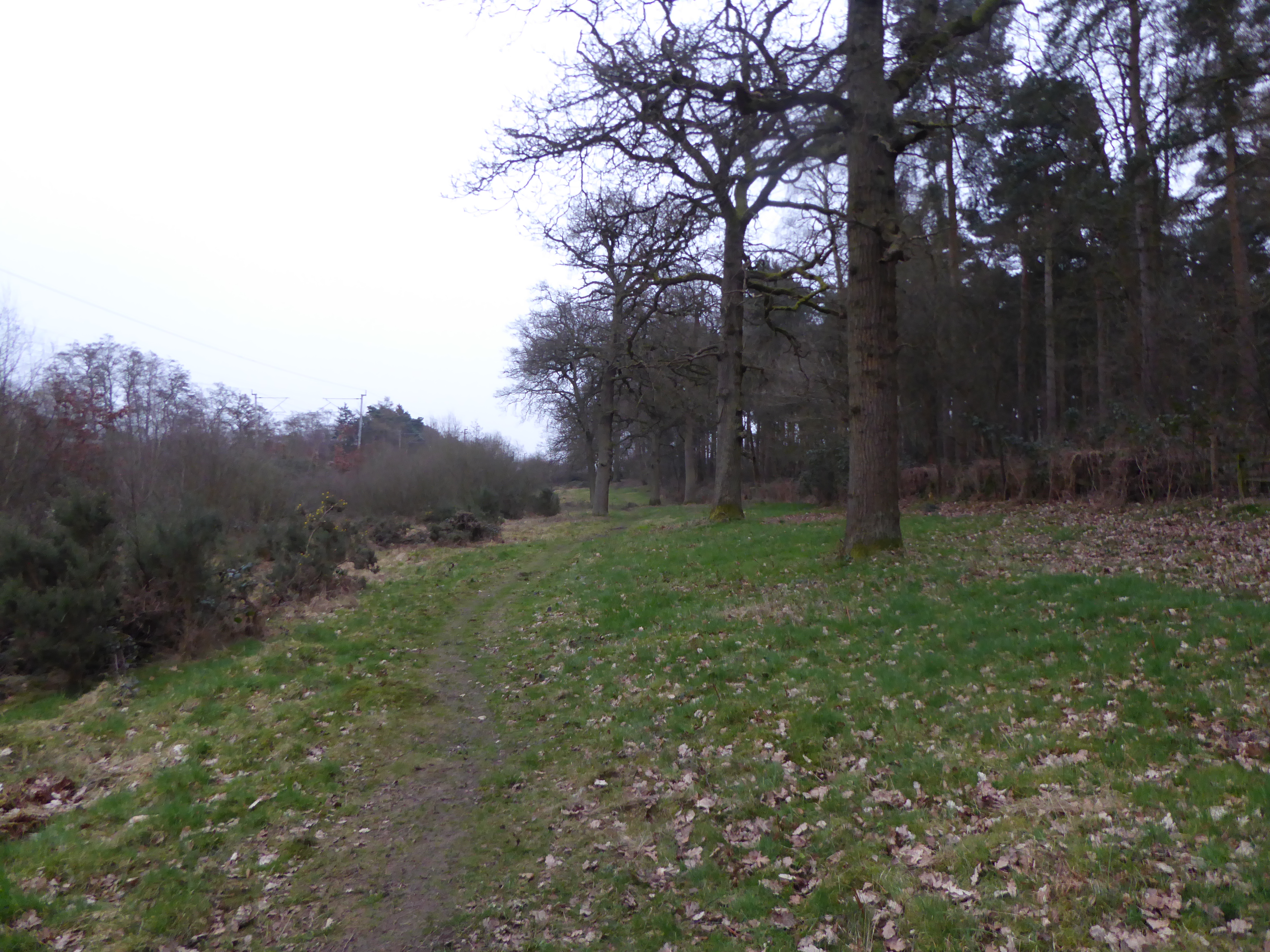
- Harlestone Heath south
- Interactive map of Harlestone Heath
- Type: Nature reserve
- Location: Northampton
- OS grid: SP 721 646
- Area: 2.6 hectares (6.4 acres)
- Manager: Wildlife Trust for Bedfordshire, Cambridgeshire and Northamptonshire

Harlestone Heath is a 2.6-hectare (6.4-acre) nature reserve north-west of Northampton in Northamptonshire. It is managed by the Wildlife Trust for Bedfordshire, Cambridgeshire and Northamptonshire.

The site is two narrow strips on either side of the Northampton loop railway line between Northampton and Rugby, with a tunnel connecting the strips. A stream runs along the north-east boundary. It is acid heathland, which is rare in the county. Birds include green woodpeckers and siskins, and there are butterflies such as brown arguses and speckled woods.

There is access by footpaths from Harlestone Road through the Firs conifer plantation.
