= Landpark Wood =

Nature reserve in Bedfordshire, England

Coordinates: 51.8554°N 0.5255°W

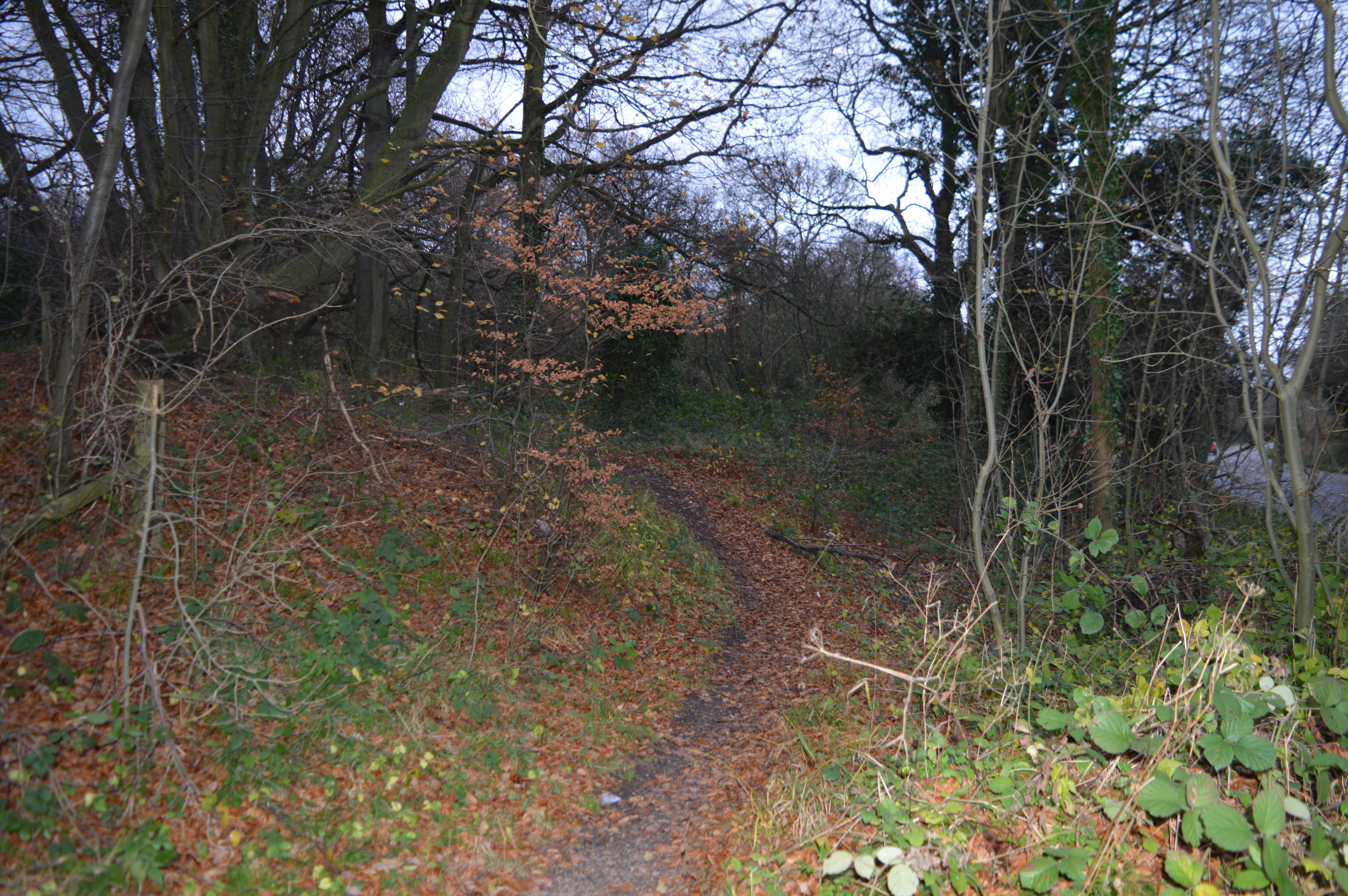

Landpark Wood is a 3.6-hectare (8.9-acre) nature reserve near Whipsnade in Bedfordshire. It is managed by the Wildlife Trust for Bedfordshire, Cambridgeshire and Northamptonshire.

This wood has mature beech trees, hornbeam, oak and ash. The understorey is hazel and hawthorn, with bluebells, yellow archangel and woodruff. Birds include woodpeckers and nuthatches.

The wood is on the corner of Dunstable Road and Land Park Lane.
