= The Plens =

Nature reserve in the United Kingdom

Coordinates: 52.447°N 0.811°W

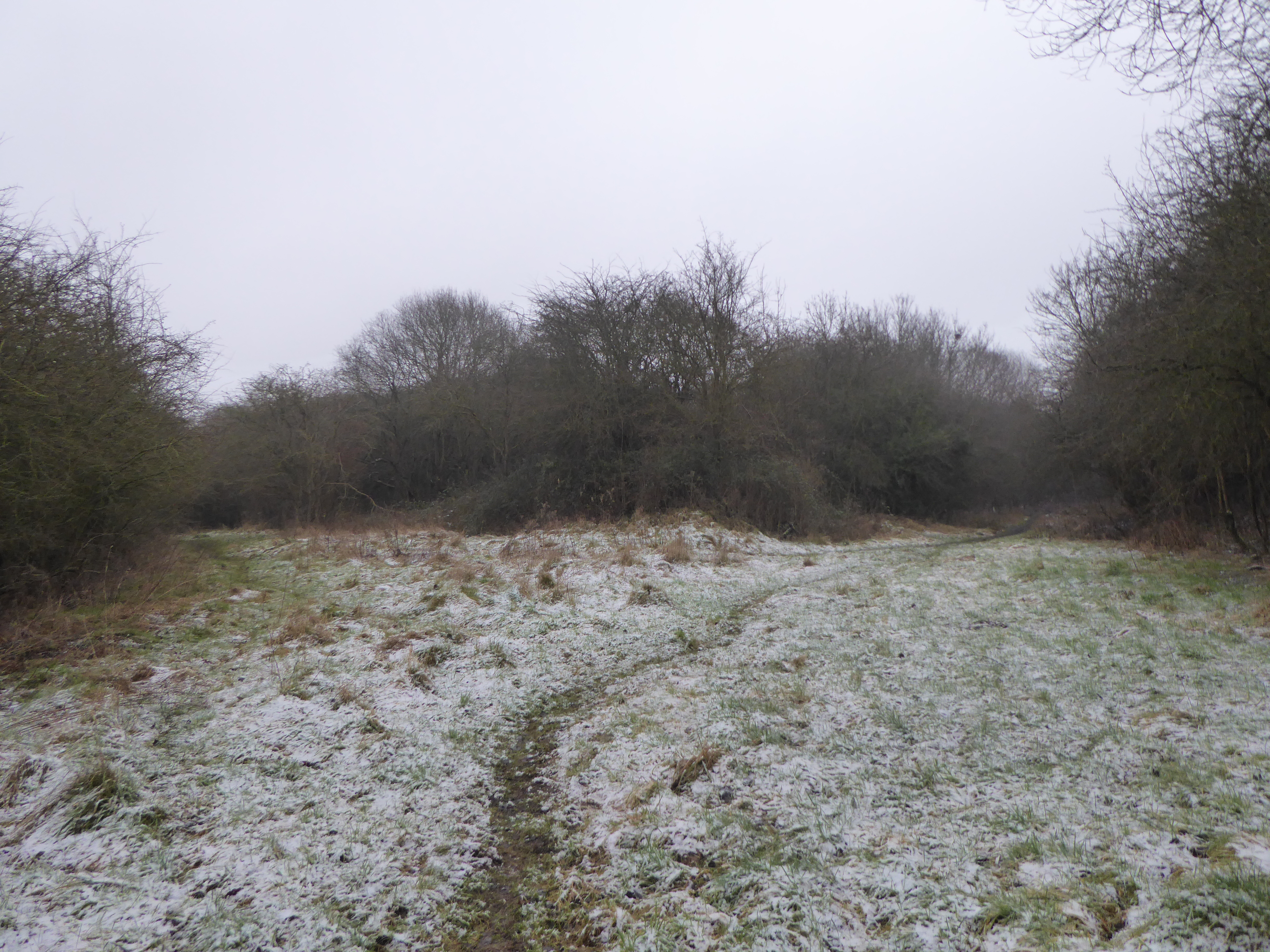
- The Plens lightly covered in snow
- Interactive map of The Plens
- Type: Nature reserve
- Location: Desborough, Northamptonshire
- OS grid: SP 809 839
- Area: 5 hectares (12 acres)
- Manager: Wildlife Trust for Bedfordshire, Cambridgeshire and Northamptonshire

The Plens is a 5 hectare nature reserve in Desborough in Northamptonshire. It is managed by the Wildlife Trust for Bedfordshire, Cambridgeshire and Northamptonshire.

Former use as a quarry and a railway line have created steep slopes and varied habitats, with grassland, hawthorn scrub, woodland and herbs. Flowers include wild basil, bladder campion, moschatel and bird's-foot-trefoil. There is a diverse range of invertebrates, particularly butterflies.

There is access from Ironwood Avenue.
