= Stoke Bruerne Brick Pits =

Nature reserve in Northamptonshire, England

Coordinates: 52.139°N 0.914°W

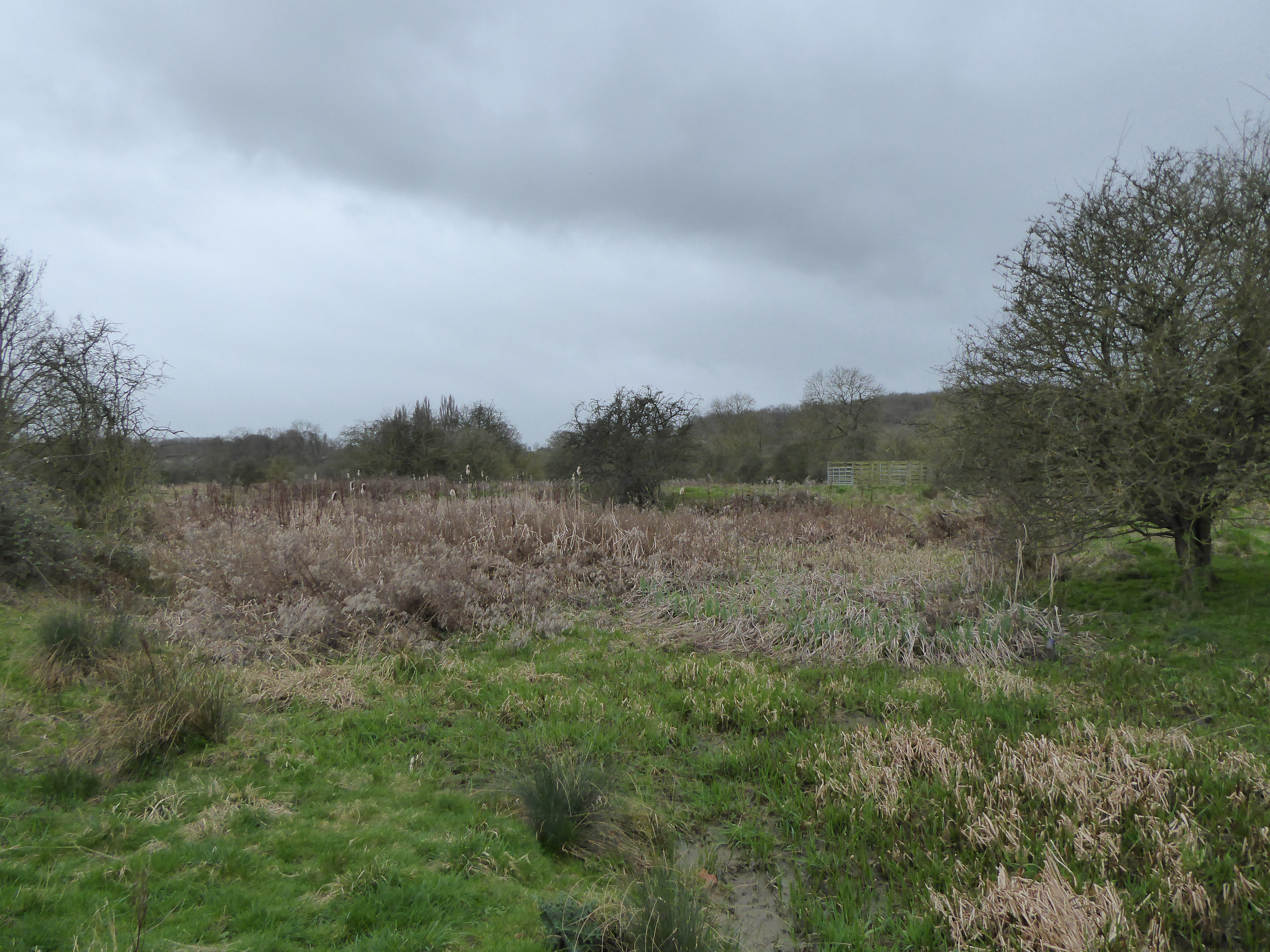
- Interactive map of Stoke Bruerne Brick Pits
- Type: Nature reserve
- Location: Stoke Bruerne, Northamptonshire
- OS grid: SP 744 495
- Area: 6 hectares (15 acres)
- Manager: Wildlife Trust for Bedfordshire, Cambridgeshire and Northamptonshire

Stoke Bruerne Brick Pits is a six hectare nature reserve in Stoke Bruerne in Northamptonshire. It is managed by the Wildlife Trust for Bedfordshire, Cambridgeshire and Northamptonshire.

This former brickworks was opened at the end of the eighteenth century for the construction of the Grand Junction Canal, and is on its bank. There are diverse habitats with grassland, ponds, a reed bed and a redundant arm of the canal. Invertebrates include white-legged damselflies and there are a variety of small mammals which provide food for barn owls.

There is access from the canal towpath.
