= Ditchford Lakes and Meadows =

Nature reserve in the United Kingdom

Coordinates: 52.3°N 0.638°W

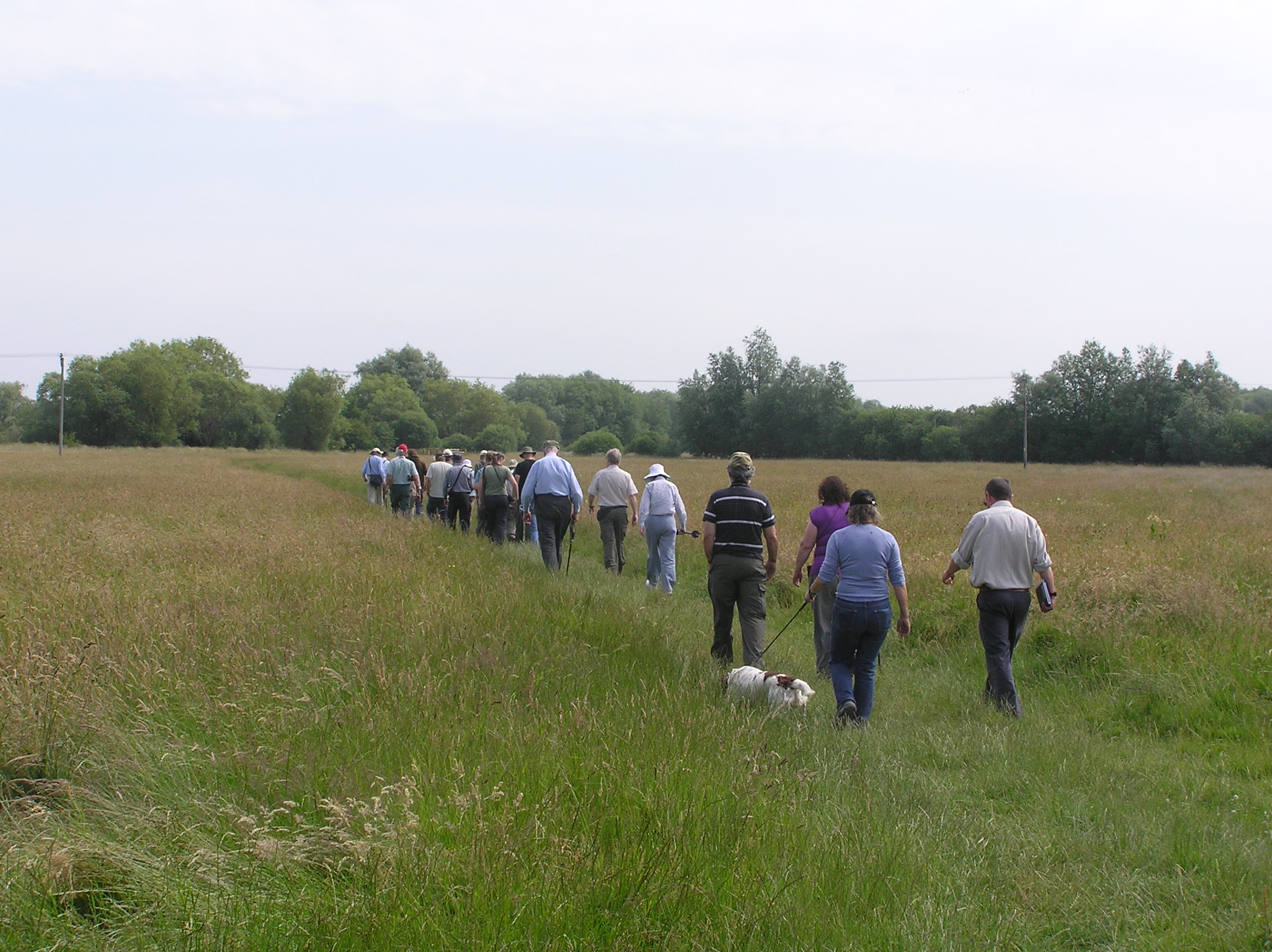
- Interactive map of Ditchford Lakes and Meadows
- Type: Nature reserve
- Location: Higham Ferrers, Northamptonshire
- OS grid: SP 930 678
- Area: 31.1 hectares (77 acres)
- Manager: Wildlife Trust for Bedfordshire, Cambridgeshire and Northamptonshire

Ditchford Lakes and Meadows is a 31.1-hectare (77-acre) nature reserve Northamptonshire. It is managed by the Wildlife Trust for Bedfordshire, Cambridgeshire and Northamptonshire. It is part of the Upper Nene Valley Gravel Pits Site of Special Scientific Interest, Ramsar wetland site of international importance, and Special Protection Area under the European Communities Birds Directive.

This site has lakes in old gravel pits which are used by wintering and breeding birds such as Cetti's warblers, coots, oystercatchers and grey herons. The lakes are also visited by otters. There are areas of grassland and willow scrub.

There is access from Ditchford Road.
