= Cut-throat Meadow =

Nature reserve in Bedfordshire, England

Coordinates: 52.032008°N 0.484685°W

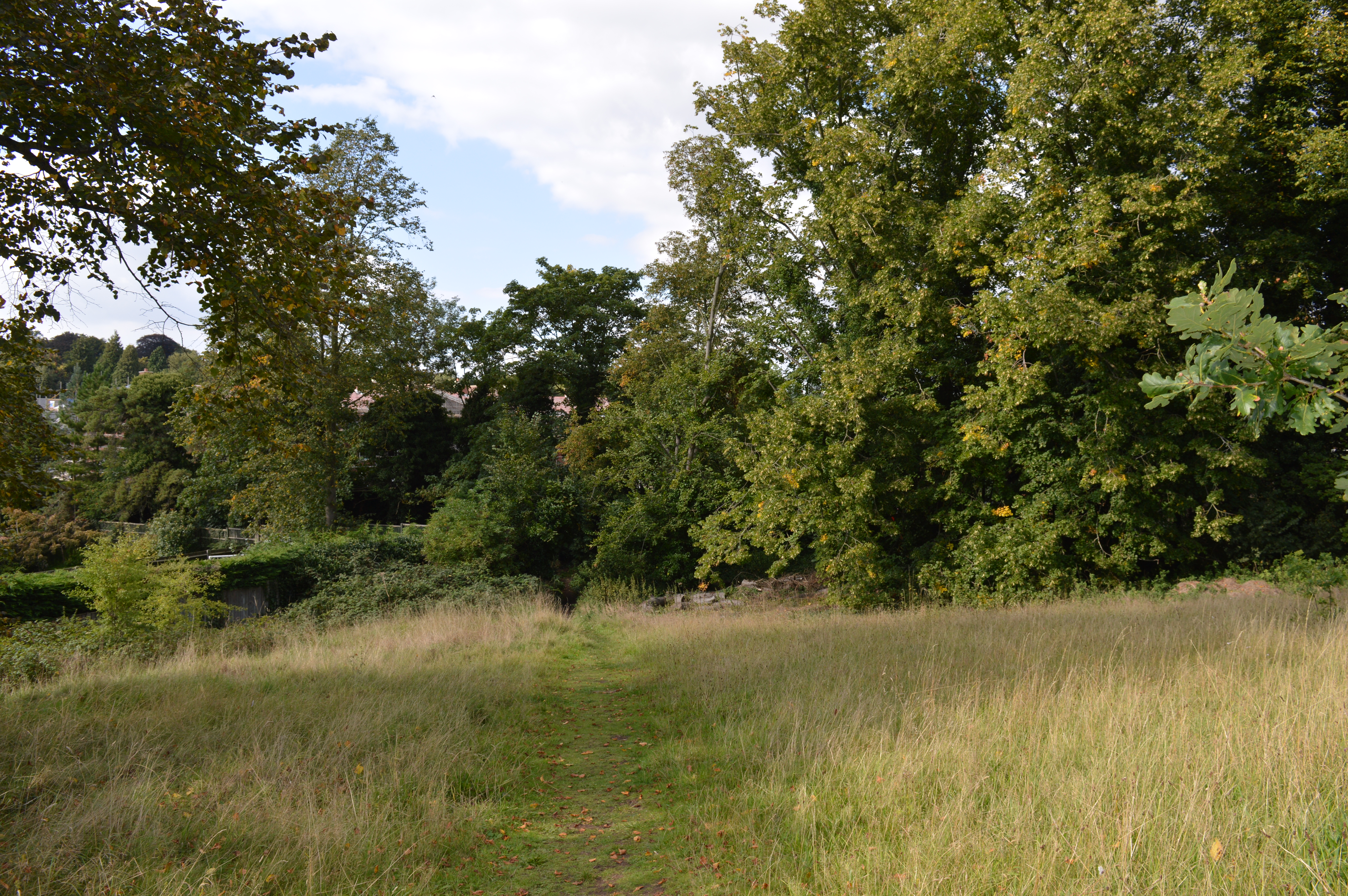
Meadow area with trees

Cut-throat Meadow is a 1.5 hectare nature reserve in Ampthill in Bedfordshire. It is managed by the Wildlife Trust for Bedfordshire, Cambridgeshire and Northamptonshire.

The reserve is in three separate areas off Ailesbury Road. There is a steeply sloping meadow area at the corner of Ailesbury Road and Church Street, a steeply sloping wood at the corner of Ailesbury Road and Snow Hill, and a pond between Rushbrook Close and Manton Close.

Meadow saxifrage and field woodrush flower in the spring in the meadow area, and invertebrates include grasshoppers and bush crickets. The main trees in the wood are beech and scots pine, with an understorey of hawthorn, yew and hazel. The pond has reedmace and celery-leaved buttercup, and there are water boatmen and pond skaters on the surface.
