= Wicksteed Park Nature Reserve =

Nature reserve in Northamptonshire, England

Coordinates: 52.385°N 0.703°W

Wicksteed Park
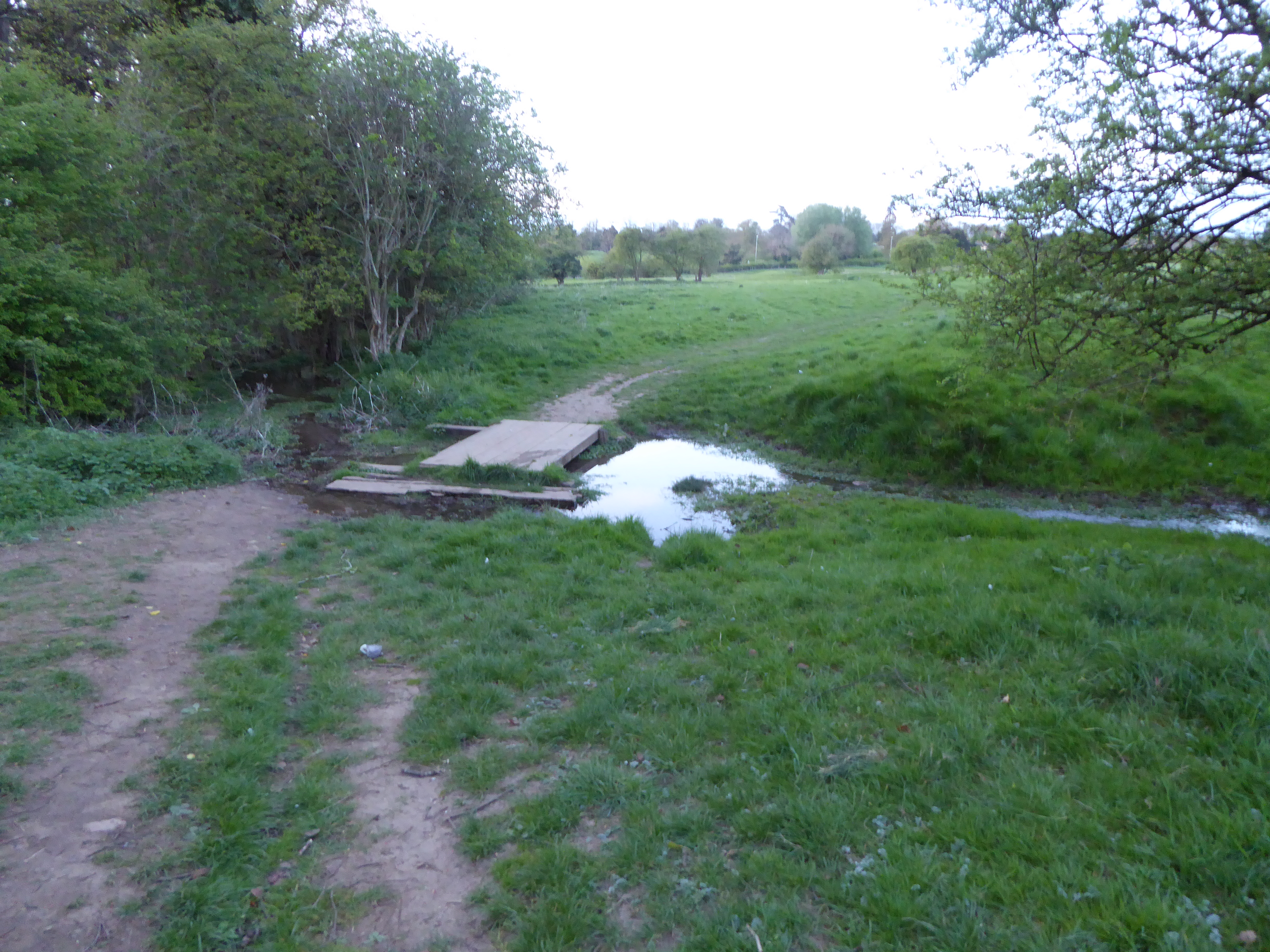
- Castle Field
- Interactive map of Wicksteed Park
- Type: Nature reserve
- Location: Barton Seagrave, Northamptonshire
- OS grid: SP 884 771
- Area: 14.2 hectares (35 acres)
- Manager: Wildlife Trust for Bedfordshire, Cambridgeshire and Northamptonshire

Wicksteed Park is a 14.2-hectare (35-acre) nature reserve in Barton Seagrave, on the eastern outskirts of Kettering in Northamptonshire. It is managed by the Wildlife Trust for Bedfordshire, Cambridgeshire and Northamptonshire.

This site is in two areas, Wicksteed Water Meadows and Castle Field. Water meadows are flooded by people for agricultural purposes, unlike flood meadows which are under water when river levels are high. Flora include great burnet and marsh marigold, and there are also grass snakes.

There is public access to Castle Field on the south side of Barton Road but not the water meadows on the north side.
