= Barnes Meadow =

Nature reserve in the United Kingdom

Coordinates: 52.23°N 0.877°W

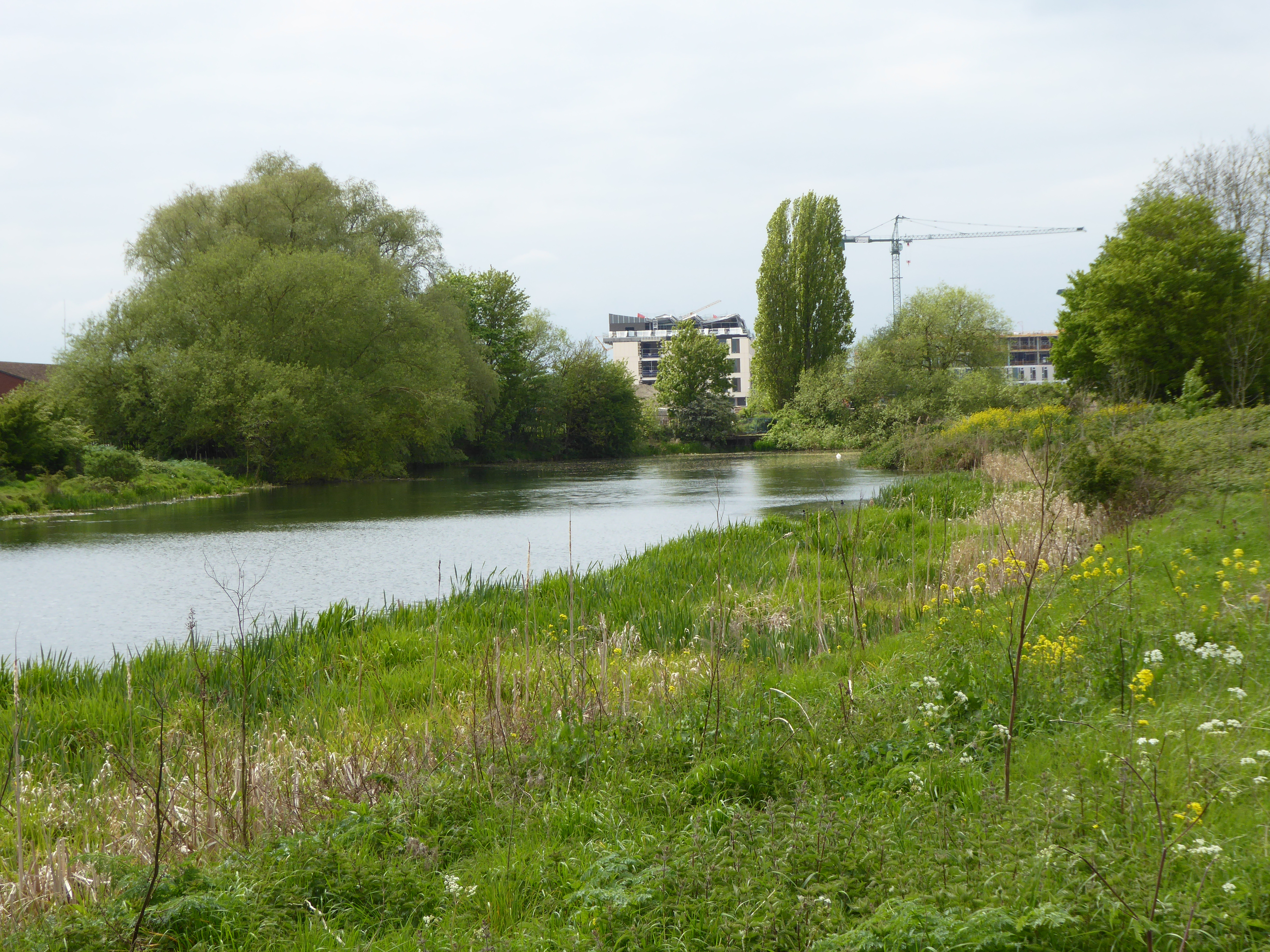
- The River Nene in Barnes Meadow
- Interactive map of Barnes Meadow
- Type: Local Nature Reserve
- Location: Northampton
- OS grid: SP 768 597
- Area: 29.4 hectares (73 acres)
- Manager: Wildlife Trust for Bedfordshire, Cambridgeshire and Northamptonshire

Barnes Meadow is a 29.4 hectare Local Nature Reserve in Northampton. An area of 20 hectares is managed by the Wildlife Trust for Bedfordshire, Cambridgeshire and Northamptonshire.

The site includes a stretch of the River Nene, meadows and a redundant arm of the river. There are many dragonflies including brown hawkers, and a large population of grass snakes. Birds include grey herons, kingfishers and great crested grebes.

There is access from the Nene Way footpath, which passes through the site.
