= Cople Pits =

Nature reserve in Bedfordshire, England

Coordinates: 52.1302°N 0.3899°W

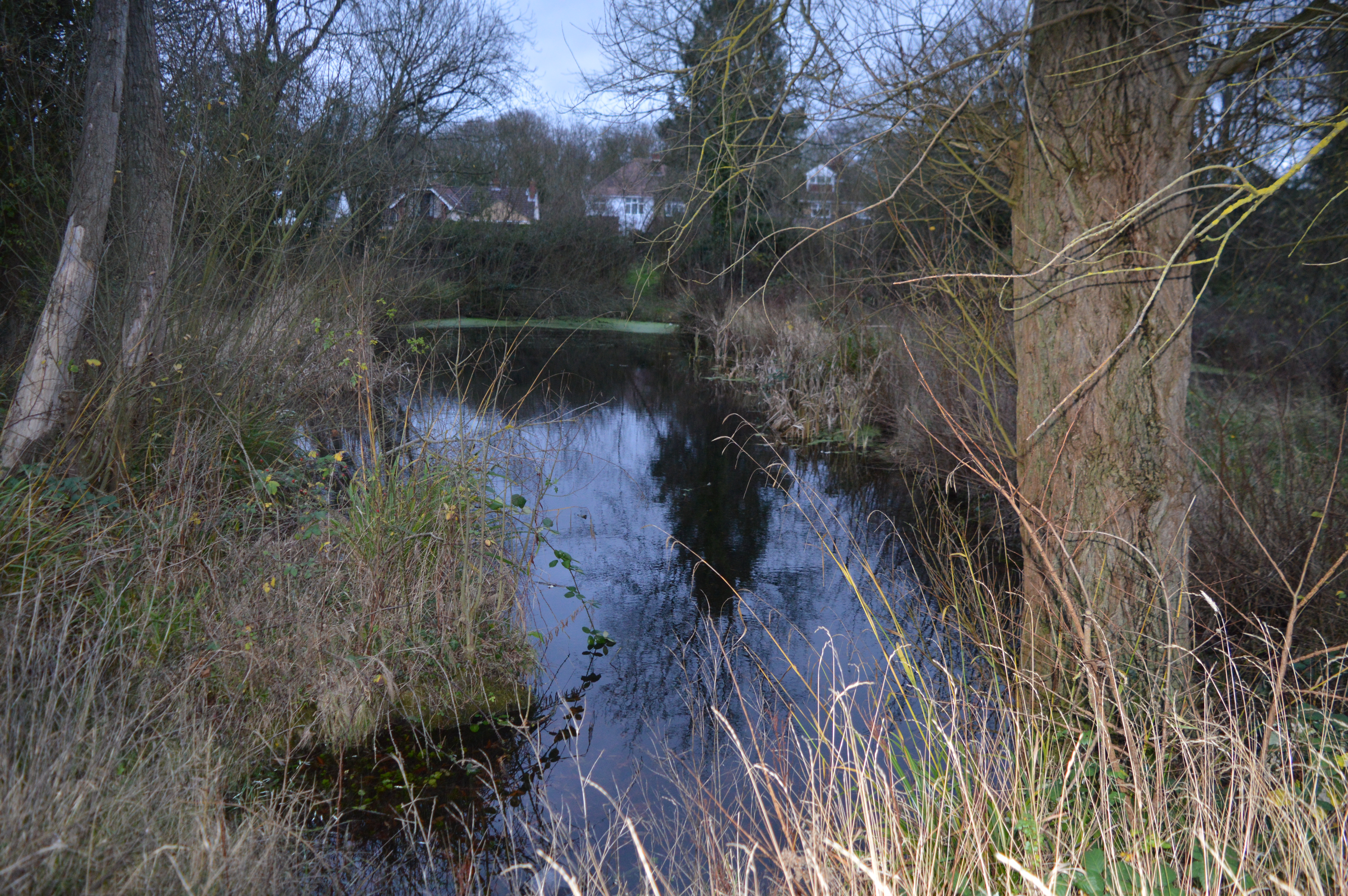

Cople Pits is a 2-hectare (4.9-acre) nature reserve in Cople in Bedfordshire. It is managed by the Wildlife Trust for Bedfordshire, Cambridgeshire and Northamptonshire.

The site has eleven long water-filled pits from gravel extraction in the 1930s, which are now surrounded by willow and hawthorn scrub. The pits have been colonised by aquatic plants. Fauna include dragonflies, kingfishers and woodpeckers, and there is also a wildflower meadow.

There is access by a short footpath from Willington Road, adjacent to All Saints Road.
