= Lancot Meadow =

Nature reserve in Bedfordshire, England

Coordinates: 51.8853°N 0.5434°W

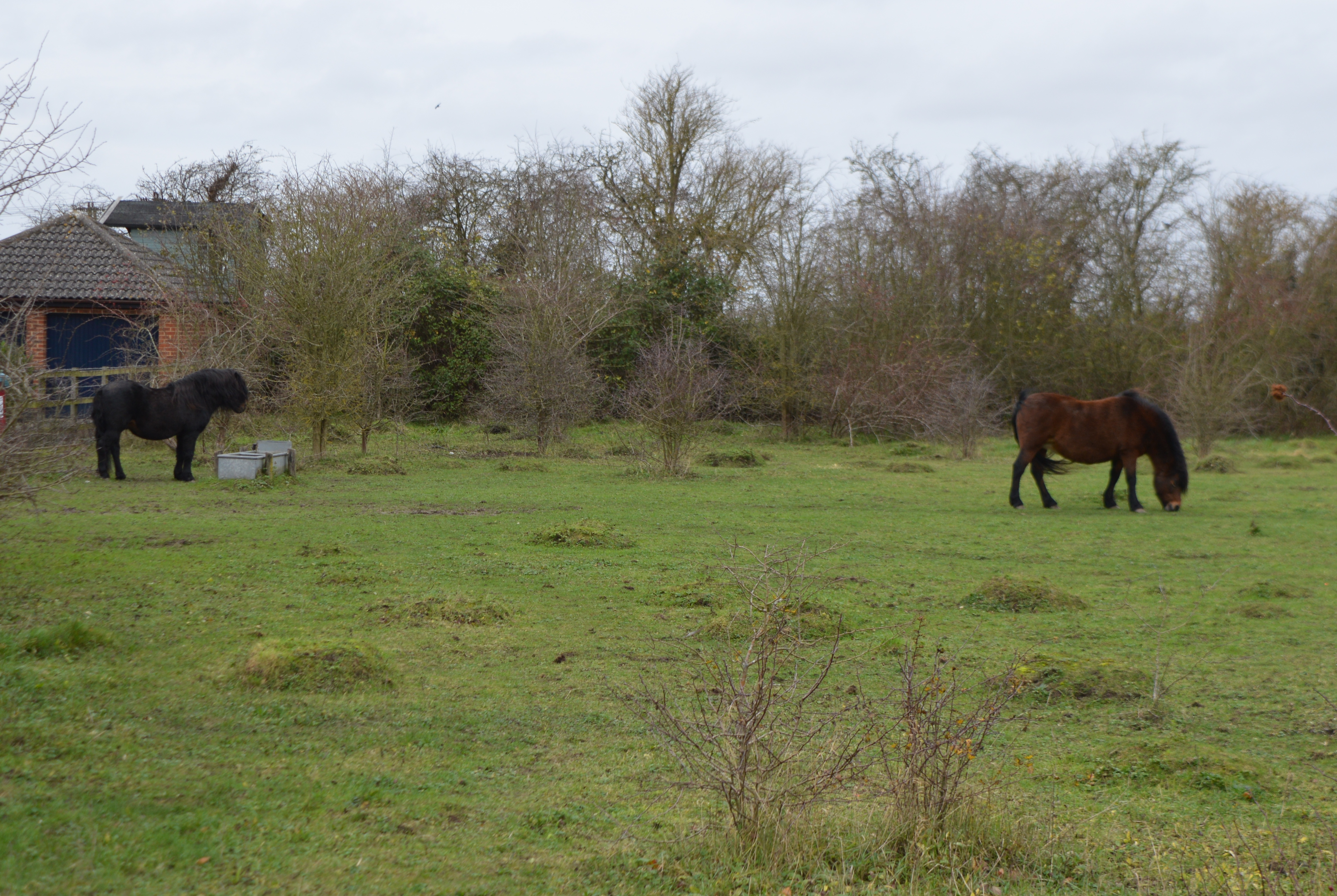

Lancot Meadow is a 2-hectare (4.9-acre) nature reserve in western Dunstable in Bedfordshire. It is managed by the Wildlife Trust for Bedfordshire, Cambridgeshire and Northamptonshire.

The site is a grassland remnant on chalk soil, and a remnant of flower-rich meadows in the area. Flora include common spotted-orchids, ox-eye daisies and bird's foot trefoils. There are fauna such as song thrushes and marbled white butterflies. Hedgerows provide and additional habitat.

There is access from Badgers Gate.
