= Thorpe Wood =

Nature reserve in Cambridgeshire, England

Coordinates: 52.571°N 0.292°W

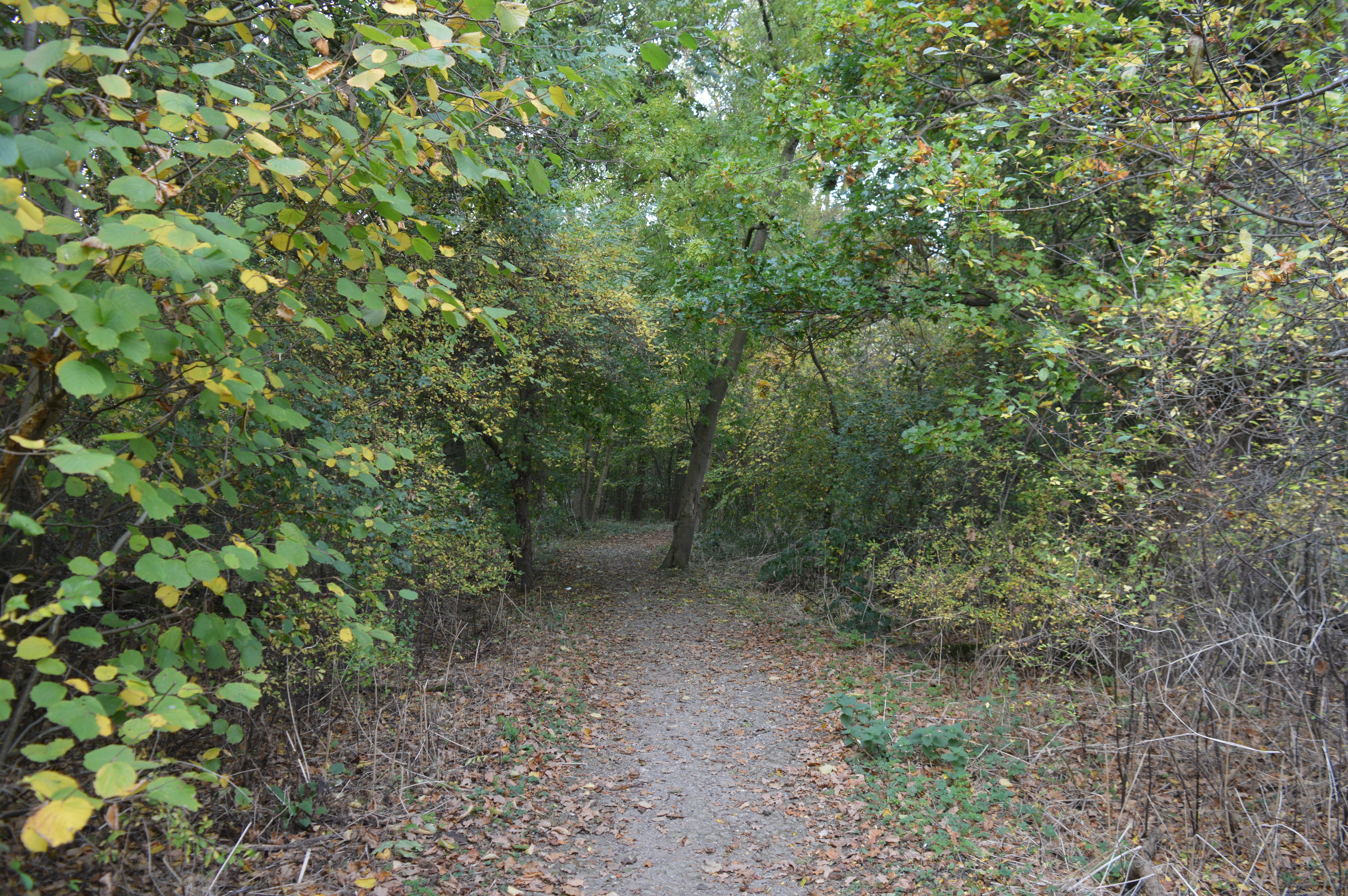
- Interactive map of Thorpe Wood
- Type: Nature reserve
- Location: Peterborough, Cambridgeshire
- OS grid: TL158983
- Area: 10 hectares (25 acres)
- Manager: Wildlife Trust for Bedfordshire, Cambridgeshire and Northamptonshire

Thorpe Wood is a 10 hectare nature reserve on the western outskirts of Peterborough in Cambridgeshire. It is managed by the Wildlife Trust for Bedfordshire, Cambridgeshire and Northamptonshire.

This is ancient woodland on heavy clay, with mature oak and ash trees, and an understorey of hazel and field maple. The ground flora is diverse, including wild garlic, wood anemones and bluebells.

There is access from Nene Parkway.
