= Dogsthorpe Star Pit =

Nature reserve in Peterborough, England

Coordinates: 52.608°N 0.212°W

- Site of Special Scientific Interest
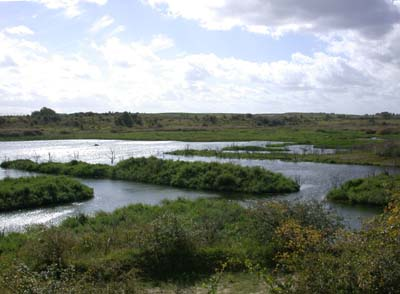
- Location of Dogsthorpe Star Pit.
- Area of search: Cambridgeshire
- Grid reference: TF 212 026
- Interest: Biological
- Area: 36.4 hectares
- Notification date: 1993
- Location map: Magic Map

Dogsthorpe Star Pit is a 36.4-hectare (90-acre) biological Site of Special Scientific Interest (SSSI)) on the eastern outskirts of Peterborough in Cambridgeshire. It is also designated a Local Nature Reserve, and it is managed by the Wildlife Trust for Bedfordshire, Cambridgeshire and Northamptonshire.

This former brick pit has been designated an SSSI mainly for its invertebrates, especially its water beetles, with 64 species, including four on the IUCN Red List of Threatened Species, Graptodytes bilineatus, Dryops similaris, Gyrinus distinctus and Myopites inulaedyssentericae. There are diverse habitats with grassland, scrub, reedbeds, sedge, bare clay and pools.

There is access to the site by a footpath from Whitepost Road.
