= Finedon Cally Banks =

Nature reserve in Northamptonshire, England

Coordinates: 52.331°N 0.678°W

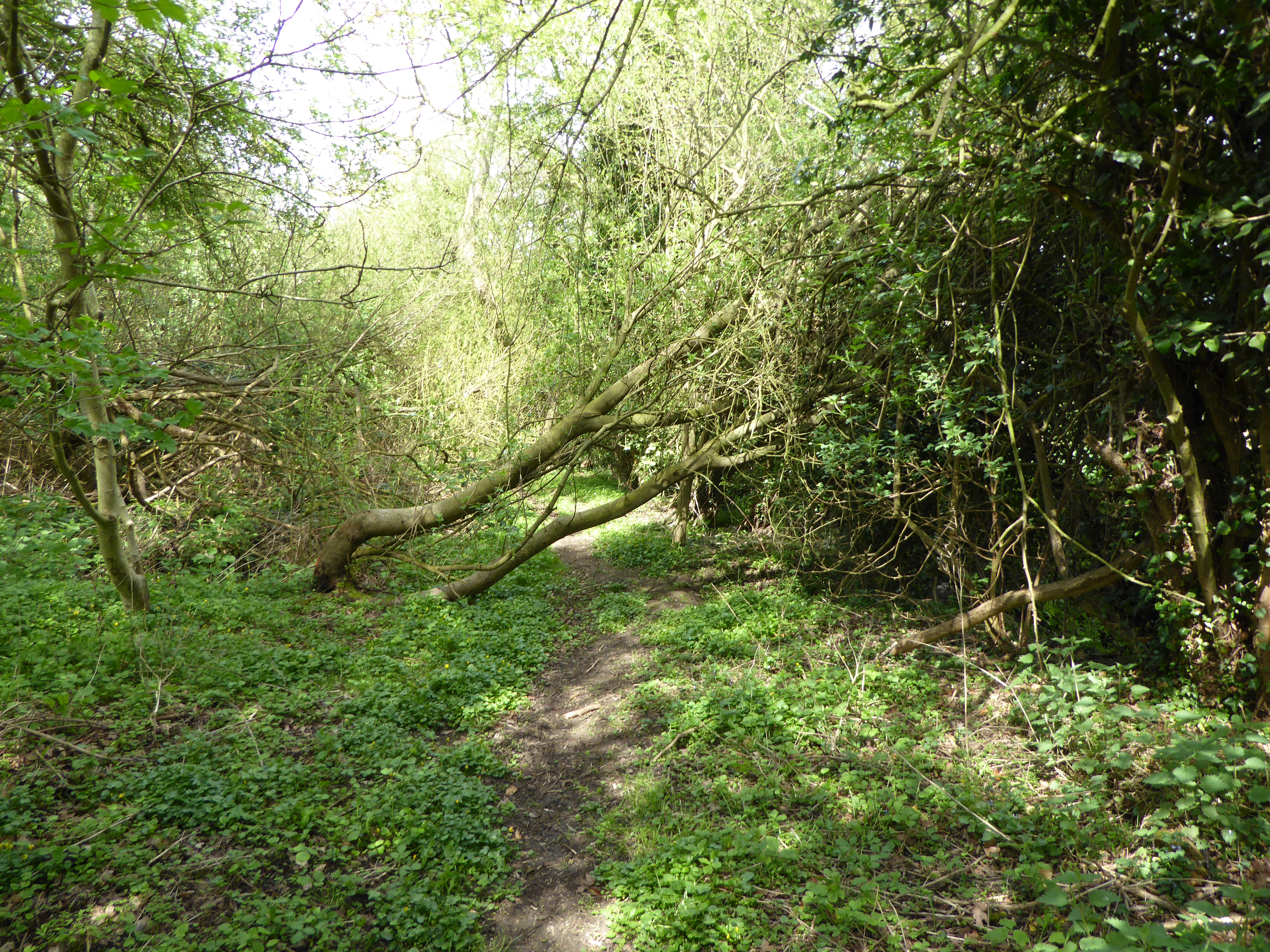
- Interactive map of Finedon Cally Banks
- Type: Nature reserve
- Location: Wellingborough, Northamptonshire
- OS grid: SP 902 712
- Area: 2.5 hectares (6.2 acres)
- Manager: Wildlife Trust for Bedfordshire, Cambridgeshire and Northamptonshire

Finedon Cally Banks is a 2.5-hectare (6.2-acre) nature reserve north-east of Wellingborough in Northamptonshire. It is managed by the Wildlife Trust for Bedfordshire, Cambridgeshire and Northamptonshire.

The site was formerly used to burn ironstone to remove impurities, leaving a layer of calcine, which produces poor soil in which wildflowers flourish. The reserve also includes a stretch of railway embankment for transporting the iron ore. Flora include common spotted orchids, great reedmace, kidney vetch and meadowsweet.

There is access by a footpath from Harrowden Lane and along the railway embankment from Finedon.
