= Warboys and Wistow Woods =

Nature reserve in the United Kingdom

- Site of Special Scientific Interest
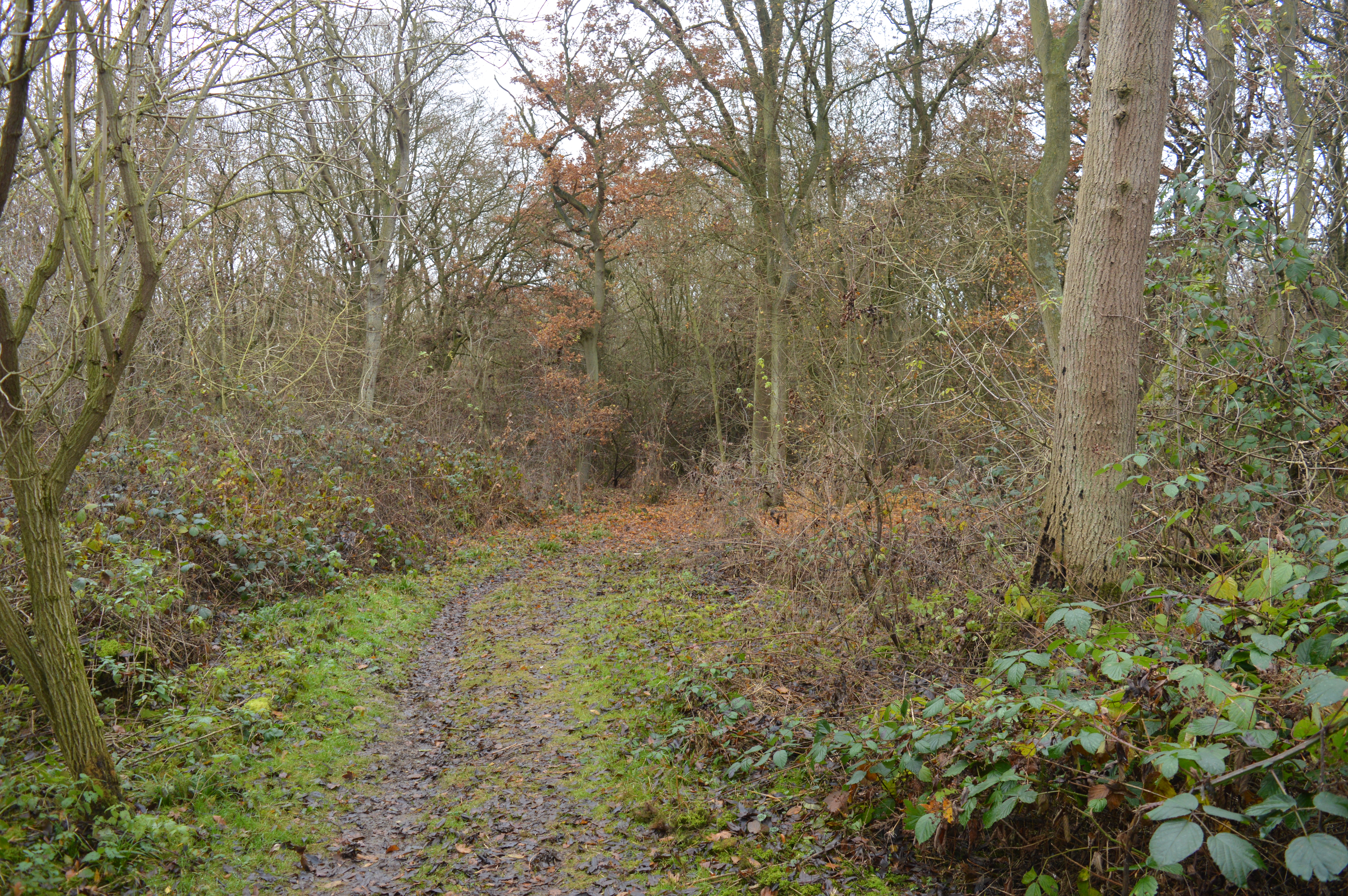

- Location within Cambridgeshire
- Location of Warboys and Wistow Woods.
- Area of search: Cambridgeshire
- Grid reference: TL 300 818
- Coordinates: 52.419°N 0.090°W
- Interest: Biological
- Area: 44.5 hectares
- Notification date: 1983

Warboys and Wistow Woods is a 44.5-hectare (110-acre) biological Site of Special Scientific Interest north of Warboys and west of Wistow in Cambridgeshire. Wistow Wood is an 8.5-hectare (21-acre) nature reserve owned and managed by the Wildlife Trust for Bedfordshire, Cambridgeshire and Northamptonshire.

These woods have high conservation value because they are ancient ash and maple, and this habitat has sharply declined in extent since 1945. The woods have diverse flora and fauna, particularly invertebrates.

There is access to Wistow Wood from Wistow Fen Lane, but Warboys Wood is private land with no public access.
