= Southfield Farm Marsh =

Nature reserve in Northamptonshire, England

Coordinates: 52.374°N 0.702°W

- Site of Special Scientific Interest
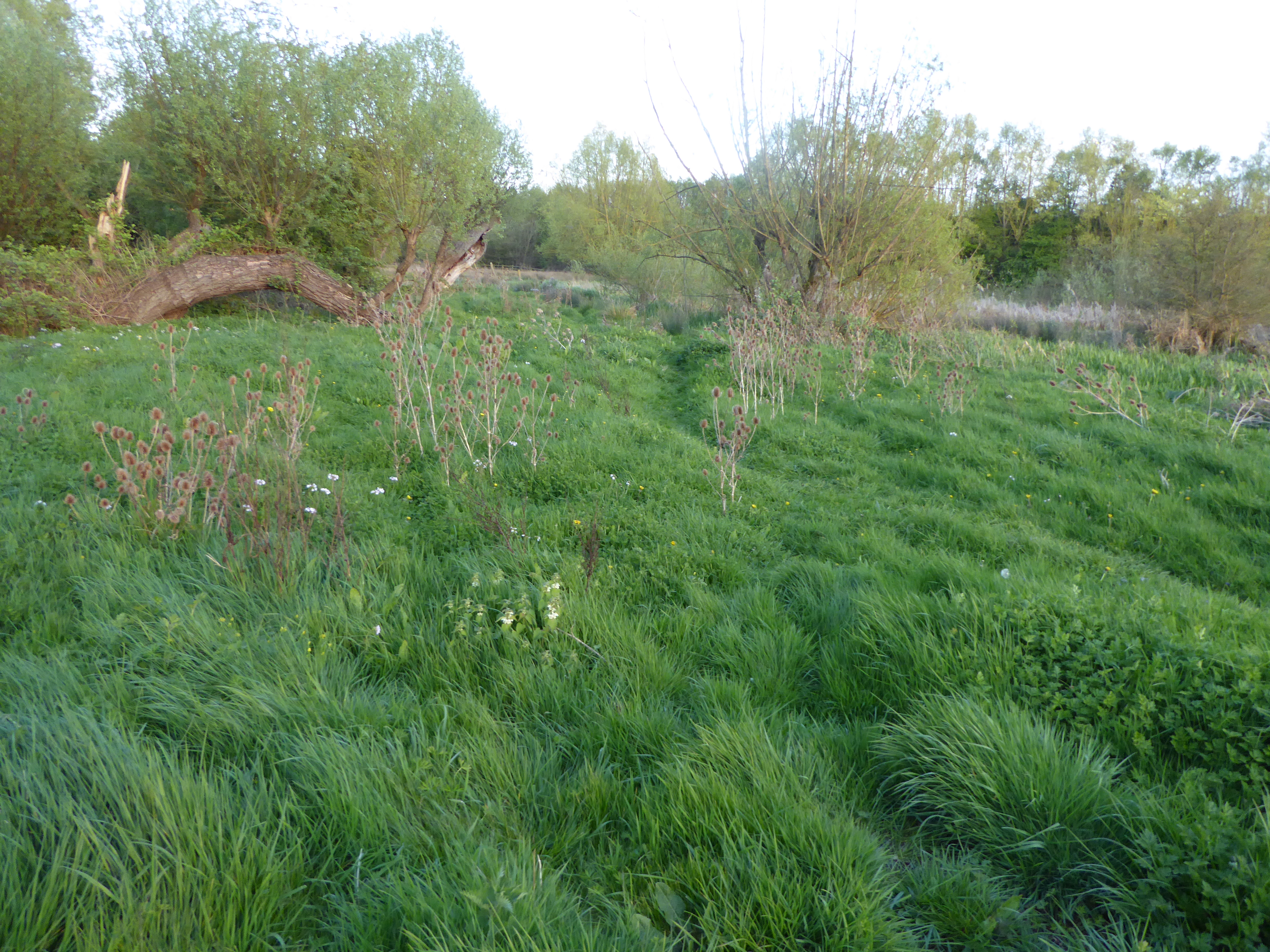
- Location of Southfield Farm Marsh.
- Area of search: Northamptonshire
- Grid reference: SP 884 758
- Interest: Biological
- Area: 8.6 hectares
- Notification date: 1984
- Location map: Magic Map

Southfield Farm Marsh is an 8.6-hectare (21-acre) biological Site of Special Scientific Interest in Kettering in Northamptonshire. An area of 2.8 hectares is managed as a nature reserve by the Wildlife Trust for Bedfordshire, Cambridgeshire and Northamptonshire.

The wetland has tall plants such as lesser pond-sedge and slender tufted-sedge, which provides cover for reed buntings and sedge warblers. Mammals include otters, and there are birds such as red kites and buzzards. Purple loosestrife is found in grassland areas.

There is access to the nature reserve by a footpath from Polwell Lane, but the rest of the site is private land with no public access.
