= Soham Wet Horse Fen =

Nature reserve in the United Kingdom

Coordinates: 52.328°N 0.363°E

- Site of Special Scientific Interest
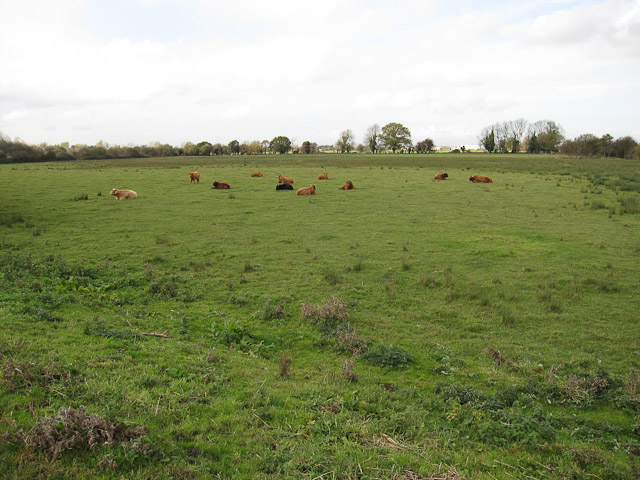
- Location of Soham Wet Horse Fen.
- Area of search: Cambridgeshire
- Grid reference: TL 611 726
- Interest: Biological
- Area: 33.8 hectares
- Notification date: 1984
- Location map: Magic Map

Soham Wet Horse Fen is a 33.8-hectare (84-acre) biological Site of Special Scientific Interest east of Soham in Cambridgeshire. A 3.6-hectare (8.9-acre) field in the north-west corner is managed by the Wildlife Trust for Bedfordshire, Cambridgeshire and Northamptonshire as Soham Meadow.

This site is neutral grassland with diverse fauna and flora, including uncommon ones. Wetter areas have herbs such as green-winged orchids and adder's tongue fern, and there are cowslips and stemless thistles in drier parts. snipe breed in wet pastures.

There is access to Soham Meadow by a footpath from Soham.
