= List of local nature reserves in Northamptonshire =

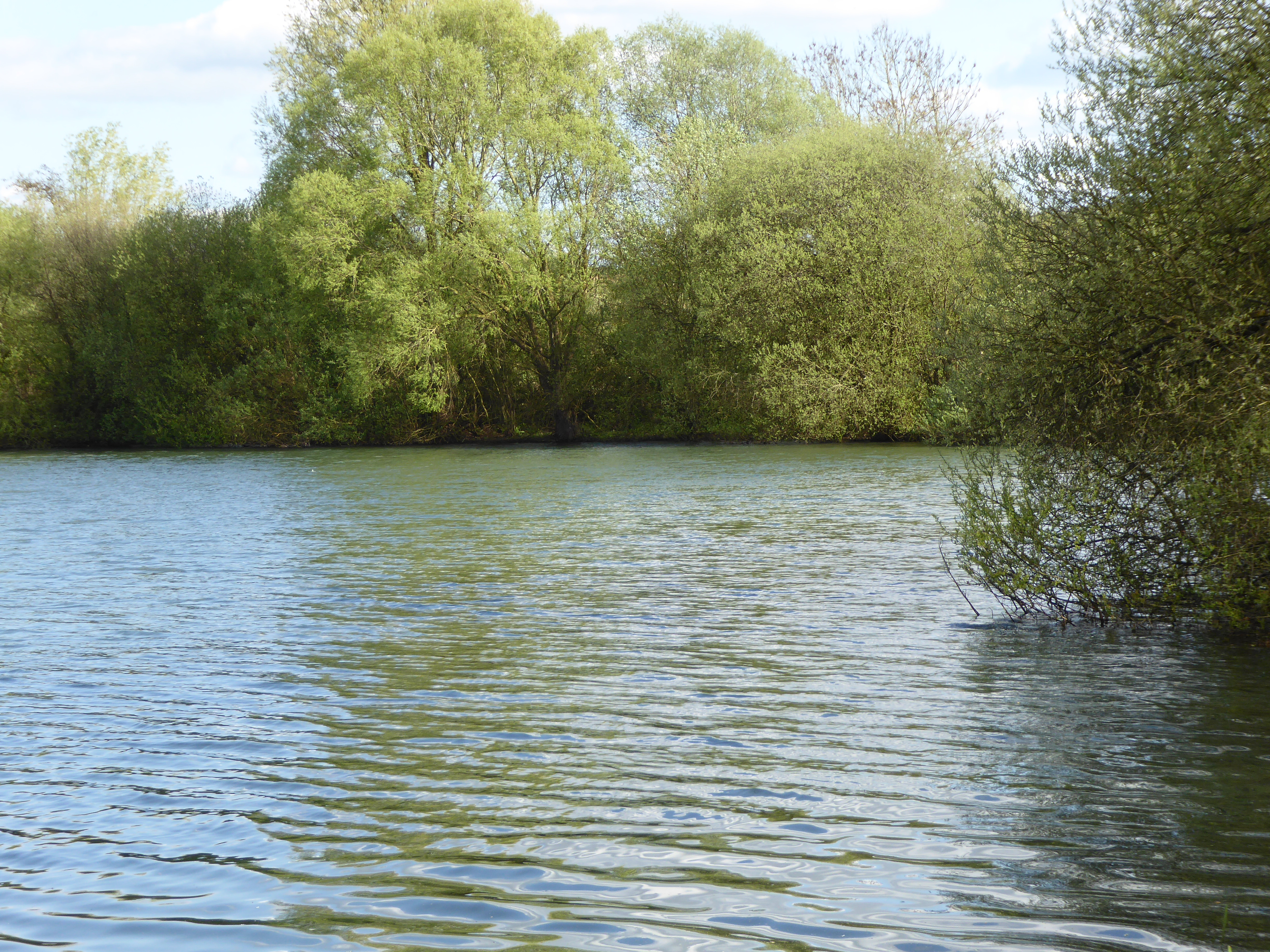
Kinewell Lake

Northamptonshire is a county in the East Midlands of England. It has an area of 236,700 hectares (914 sq mi) and a population estimated in mid-2015 at 723,000. It is bordered by Warwickshire, Leicestershire, Rutland, Lincolnshire, Cambridgeshire, Bedfordshire, Buckinghamshire and Oxfordshire. It was governed by Northamptonshire County Council and seven district and borough councils, Corby, Daventry, East Northamptonshire, Kettering, Northampton, South Northamptonshire and Wellingborough until April 2021 when North Northamptonshire and West Northamptonshire unitary authorities were formed. The county flower is the cowslip.

A ridge of low Jurassic hills runs through the county, separating the basins of the Welland and Nene rivers. The county has good communications as it is crossed by two main railway lines and the M1 motorway, and it has many small industrial centres rather than large conurbations. The main architectural feature is its country houses and mansions.

As of May 2017, there are 18 local nature reserves in Northamptonshire, and there is public access to all sites. Twelve are managed by the Wildlife Trust for Bedfordshire, Cambridgeshire and Northamptonshire, and two are also Sites of Special Scientific Interest, Ramsar internationally important wetland sites, and Special Protection Areas under the European Union Directive on the Conservation of Wild Birds. The largest site is Titchmarsh Nature Reserve at 72.7 hectares (180 acres), which has nationally important numbers of goosanders, wigeons and gadwalls in winter. The smallest is Great Oakley Meadow, which has prominent surviving ridge and furrow from the medieval ploughing system.

== Other classifications ==
- Ramsar = Ramsar site
- SPA = Special Protection Area
- SSSI = Site of Special Scientific Interest
- WTBCN = Wildlife Trust for Bedfordshire, Cambridgeshire and Northamptonshire

== Sites ==
Site	Photograph	Area (Note: The area is taken from the Natural England map of each site. (Click on the identify icon (i) in the "Feature Tools" and then click on the site.))	Location	District	Other classifications	Map (Note: The maps are on the Natural England database of local nature reserves.)	Details (Note: Details are on the pages on each site in the Natural England database of local nature reserves)	Description
Barnes Meadow	River Nene in Barnes Meadow	29.4 hectares (73 acres)	Northampton; 52.230°N 0.877°W; SP 768 597	West Northamptonshire	WTBCN	Map	Details	The site includes a stretch of the River Nene, meadows and a redundant arm of the river. There are many dragonflies including brown hawkers, and a large population of grass snakes. Birds include grey herons, kingfishers and great crested grebes.
Crowfields Common	Crowfields Common	8.7 hectares (21 acres)	Moulton; 52.286°N .848°W; SP 787 659	West Northamptonshire		Map	Details	The site is grassland which has surviving medieval ridge and furrow. There are also mature trees and hedgerows, and a flower meadow.
Daventry Country Park	Daventry Country Park	66.0 hectares (163 acres)	Daventry; 52.269°N 1.127°W; SP 597 638	West Northamptonshire		Map	Details	The park centres on Daventry Reservoir, which feeds the Grand Union Canal, and there are also meadows and crack willow woodland. Birds include yellowhammers, lesser whitethroats, dunnocks and song thrushes.
Farthinghoe	Farthinghoe	3.7 hectares (9.1 acres)	Farthinghoe; 52.059°N 1.249°W; SP 516 403	West Northamptonshire	WTBCN	Map	Details	This former landfill site has grassland, ponds and woodland. Flowers include lady's bedstraw and snake's-head fritillary. There are fauna such as marbled white and green-veined white butterflies, and pipistrelle and noctule bats.
Glamis Meadow and Wood	Glamis Meadow	9.5 hectares (23 acres)	Wellingborough; 52.308°N 0.708°W; SP 882 686	North Northamptonshire		Map	Details	A stream runs through this site, which has woodland and grassland. Facilities include a cycle path, seating and information boards.
Great Oakley Meadow	Great Oakley Meadow	1.9 hectares (4.7 acres)	Great Oakley; 52.462°N 0.731°W; SP 863 856	North Northamptonshire	WTBCN	Map	Details	The prominent medieval ridge and furrow at the southern end of the site displays the ancient field system of Great Oakley. The dry ridges have diverse flora including cowslip, knapweed and quaking-grass. The furrows are poorer in species, while the northern end, which borders Harpers Brook, has plants characteristic of wet ground, such as cuckooflower and hairy sedge.
Greens Norton Pocket Park	Greens Norton Pocket Park	2.0 hectares (4.9 acres)	Greens Norton; 52.137°N 1.031°W; SP 664 492	West Northamptonshire		Map	Details	This former brick pit has a pond, wetland, grassland and woods. There are picnic tables and benches. Fauna include barn owls, grass snakes, great crested newts and green woodpeckers.
Hills and Holes (Note: Hills and Holes and Scrub Field are both part of Bradlaugh Fields nature reserve, which is managed by the Wildlife Trust for Bedfordshire, Cambridgeshire and Northamptonshire.)	Hills and Holes	8.3 hectares (21 acres)	Northampton; 52.261°N 0.875°W; SP 769 631	West Northamptonshire	WTBCN	Map	Details	This is a disused quarry which was operated during an unknown period between the Middle Ages and the late eighteenth century. It has grassed ridges and hollows, some of them steeply sloping. There are a variety of habitats including limestone grassland.
Kinewell Lake	Kinewell Lake	35.4 hectares (87 acres)	Ringstead; 52.366°N 0.567°W; SP 977 752	North Northamptonshire	Ramsar, SPA, SSSI	Map	Details	The lake is a former gravel pit next to the River Nene. Birds include shovellers, great crested grebes and kingfishers. There are also otters, bats and long-horned beetles.
King's Wood	King's Wood	31.7 hectares (78 acres)	Corby; 52.475°N 0.728°W; SP 865 871	North Northamptonshire	WTBCN	Map	Details	More than 250 plant species have been recorded at this remnant of the Royal Forest of Rockingham, including ones characteristic of ancient woods such as yellow archangel and wood anemone. There are diverse invertebrates such as green-veined white butterflies and common blue damselflies.
Kingsthorpe	Kingsthorpe	14.4 hectares (36 acres)	Northampton; 52.257°N 0.910°W; SP 745 626	West Northamptonshire	WTBCN	Map	Details	This site on a tributary of the River Nene is often flooded in the winter. There are hedges and ponds, together with areas of scrub. Birds include green woodpeckers, kestrels and snipe.
Lings Wood	Lings Wood	20.1 hectares (50 acres)	Northampton; 52.267°N 0.825°W; SP 803 639	West Northamptonshire	WTBCN	Map	Details	Frogs, newts, damselflies and dragonflies breed in this nature reserve, which has woodland, ponds, scrub and grassland. There are plantations of sweet chestnut and douglas fir, but in some areas native woodland is regenerating naturally.
Scrub Field	Scrub Field	5.1 hectares (13 acres)	Northampton; 52.268°N 0.882°W; SP 764 639	West Northamptonshire	WTBCN	Map	Details	This meadow has a diverse selection of wild flowers, including field scabious and knapweed in higher areas, and bird's-foot trefoil and yellow rattle lower down.
Storton's Pit	Storton's Pits	21.9 hectares (54 acres)	Northampton; 52.233°N 0.930°W; SP 732 600	West Northamptonshire	WTBCN	Map	Details	This site on the bank of the River Nene has old gravel pits, meadow and fen ditch. Around 350 invertebrate species have been recorded, including some which are rare. Water birds include snipe, teal, tufted duck and the uncommon water rail.
Summer Leys	Summer Leys	47.7 hectares (118 acres)	Wollaston; 52.262°N 0.705°W; SP 885 634	North Northamptonshire	Ramsar, SPA SSSI, WTBCN	Map	Details	This wetland site has flooded gravel pits with bird hides, grassland, hedges and water meadows. Breeding birds include golden plovers, ringed plovers and common terns. There are butterflies such as common blues and the uncommon brown argus.
Tailby Meadow	Tailby Meadow	4.9 hectares (12 acres)	Desborough; 52.436°N 0.803°W; SP 815 827	North Northamptonshire	WTBCN	Map	Details	Artificial fertilisers have never been used on this hay meadow, and it has not been ploughed for several hundred years. There are fifteen species of grass and diverse wild flowers, including black knapweed, lady's bedstraw and lady's smock, which is a food source for the orange tip butterfly.
Tiffield Pocket Park	Tiffield Pocket Park	2.6 hectares (6.4 acres)	Tiffield; 52.164°N 0.981°W; SP 698 522	West Northamptonshire		Map	Details	This one-kilometre (0.6-mile) long site is a footpath along a former railway line. The path is lined with trees and shrubs of blackthorn, hawthorn, crab-apple and ash, and a balancing pond next to the path has been restored, increasing biodiversity.
Titchmarsh	Titchmarsh	72.7 hectares (180 acres)	Thrapston; 52.411°N 0.525°W; TL 004 803	North Northamptonshire	WTBCN	Map	Details	The River Nene runs through this site, which also has large areas of open water and grassland. There are nationally important numbers of goosanders, wigeons and gadwalls in winter, and banded demoiselle damselflies nest on nettles along the river bank.

== See also ==
- List of Sites of Special Scientific Interest in Northamptonshire
