= Moulton Co-operative Society =

Former UK retail co-operative

Moulton Co-operative Society Ltd
- Company type: Consumer co-operative
- Industry: Retail (Grocery)
- Founded: 1861
- Defunct: 2009
- Fate: Merger
- Successor: Midlands Co-operative Society
- Headquarters: Moulton, UK
- Area served: Northamptonshire

The Moulton Co-operative Society Limited, or simply Moulton Co-op, was a small regional consumer co-operative in the United Kingdom. The society was formed in 1861 and operated a single supermarket in Moulton, Northamptonshire. In January 2009, members voted overwhelmingly to transfer arrangements to Midlands Co-operative Society, which took effect on 8 February 2009.

== History ==
The Moulton Co-op was one of the last single store societies in the Midlands region, following the mergers of Desborough, Ilkeston and Raunds co-ops with the Midlands Society in recent years. John Mitchinson became Chief Executive of Moulton in 1986, serving until the merger.

=== Location ===
- Stocks Hill, Moulton, Northamptonshire

== Co-operative movement ==
The society was at merger was a member of the UK-wide Co-operative Retail Trading Group (CRTG) buying group and together with other UK Societies in every part of the country sold bulk bought branded and The Co-operative brand products. The Society was a corporate member of the Co-operative Group, the successor of the Co-operative Wholesale Society co-op, which entitled it to democratic ownership of and shared services in that large national organisation, including the Co-op Bank PLC, the movements in house bank.

=== Main Store Revamp - 2009 ===
In 2009 the former Moultons societies main store was taken under new management by the areas successor co-op the Midland Co-op. It was re-opened on 26 August 2009. The Midland co-op has itself since merged with a sister co-op, to form the Central England Co-operative Society CECS. This society retains its independent democratic ownership and board, and is owned by its members who trade with and co-own their businesses and most business premises, including the revamped Moulton Store.
