= Wilson's Pits =

Nature reserve in Northamptonshire, England

Coordinates: 52.302°N 0.617°W

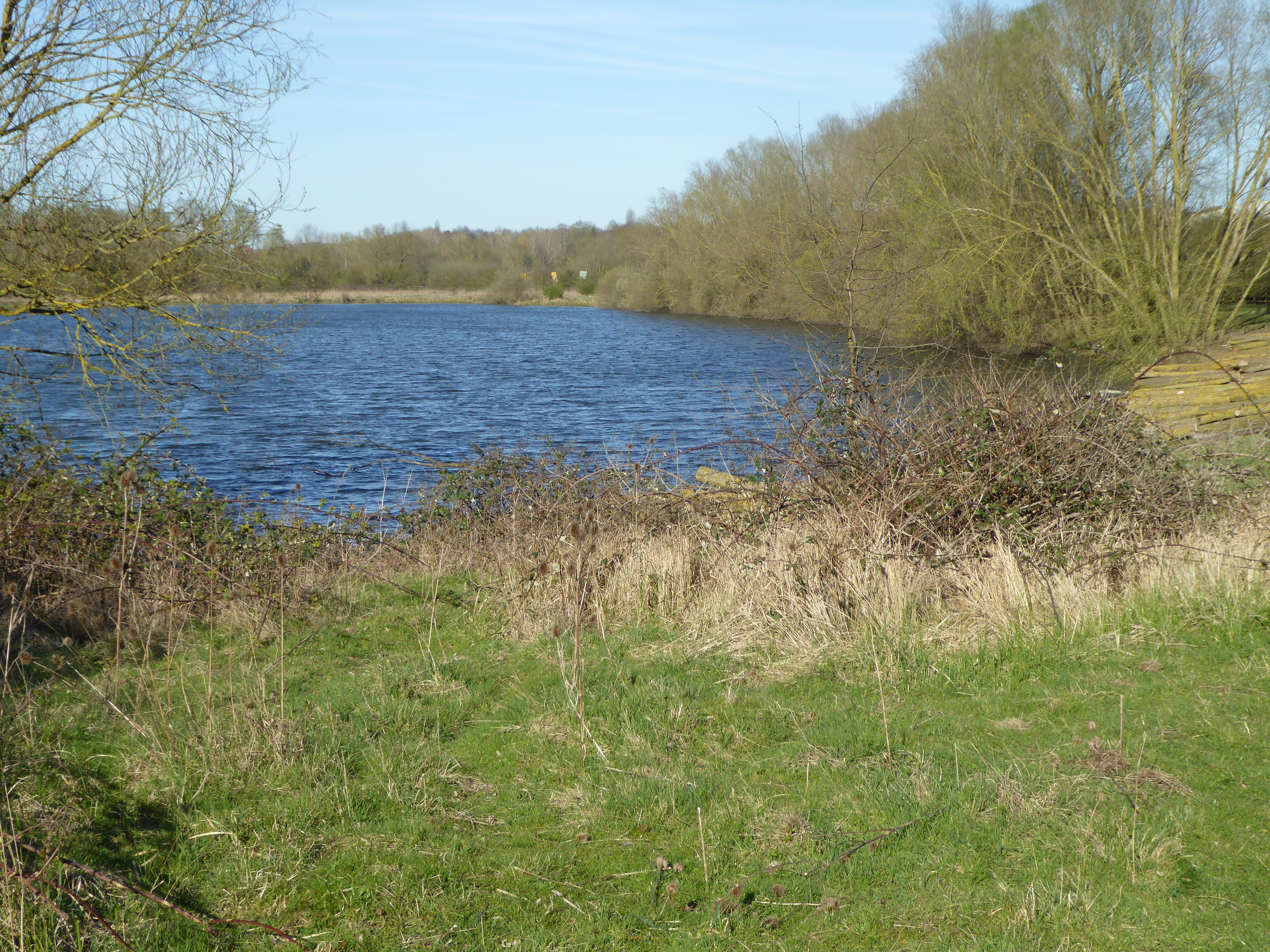
- Interactive map of Wilson's Pits
- Type: Nature reserve
- Location: Higham Ferrers, Northamptonshire
- OS grid: SP 944 680
- Area: 32 hectares (79 acres)
- Manager: Wildlife Trust for Bedfordshire, Cambridgeshire and Northamptonshire

Wilson's Pits is a 32 hectare nature reserve west of Higham Ferrers in Northamptonshire. It is managed by the Wildlife Trust for Bedfordshire, Cambridgeshire and Northamptonshire. It is part of the Upper Nene Valley Gravel Pits Site of Special Scientific Interest, Ramsar internationally important wetland site and Special Protection Area under the EC Birds Directive.

This site has three lakes in former gravel pits, and it also has areas of grassland and scrub. There are diverse bird species, and flora such as ragged-robin, brooklime, common spotted orchid and creeping jenny. Dragonflies include the brown hawker and black-tailed skimmer.

There is access from the Nene Way long distance footpath, but as of March 2017 it is closed while works are carried out to widen an adjacent roundabout.
