= Kinewell Lake =

Nature reserve in Northamptonshire, England

Coordinates: 52.366°N 0.567°W

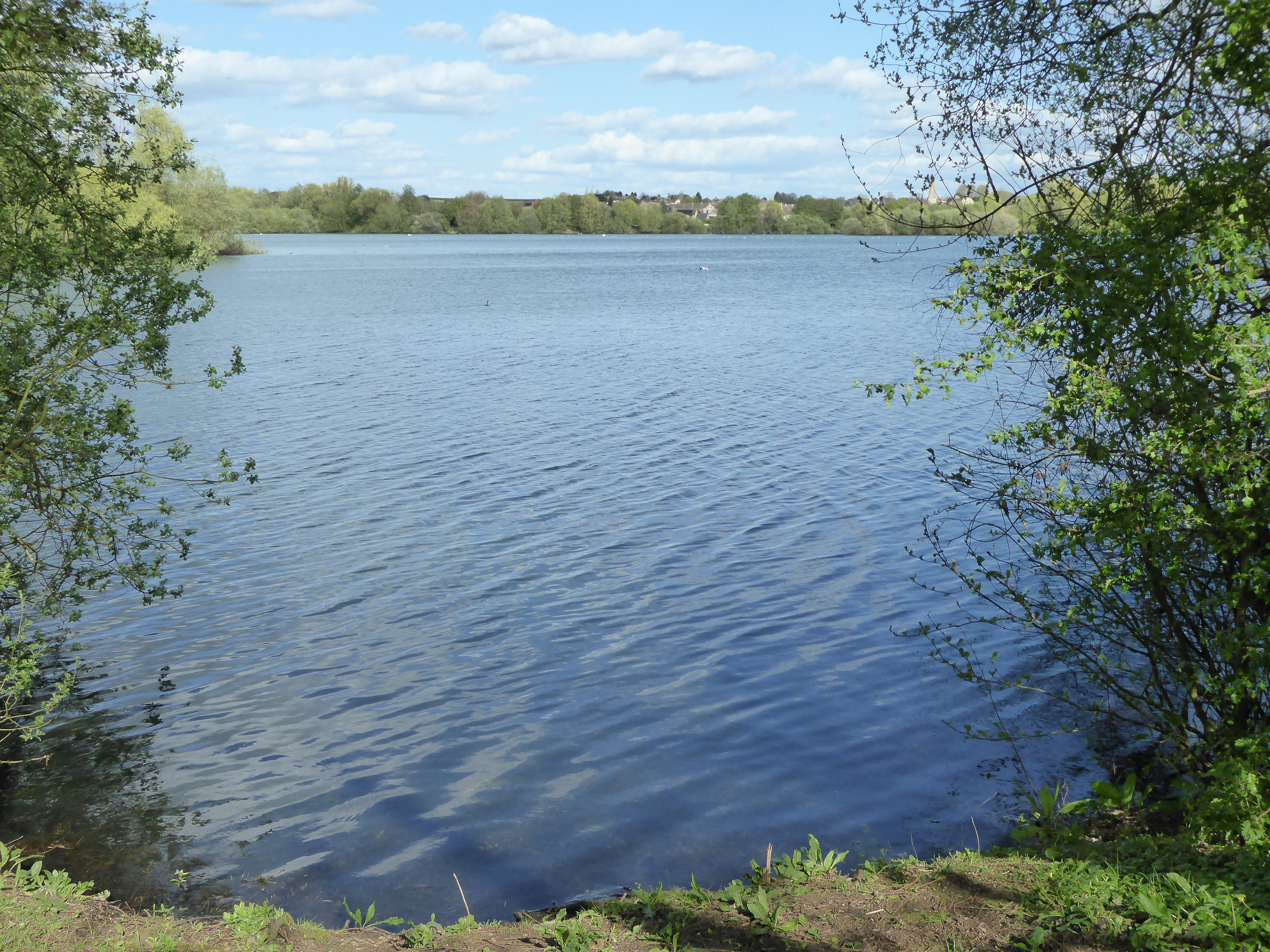
- Interactive map of Kinewell Lake
- Type: Local Nature Reserve
- Location: Ringstead, Northamptonshire
- OS grid: SP 977 752
- Area: 35.4 hectares (87 acres)
- Manager: Kinewell Lake Trust

Kinewell Lake is a 35.4 hectare Local Nature Reserve west of Ringstead in Northamptonshire, England. It is owned by Ringstead Parish Council and managed by Kinewell Lake Trust. The site is part of the Upper Nene Valley Gravel Pits Site of Special Scientific Interest, Ramsar wetland site of international importance, and Special Protection Area under the European Communities Birds Directive.

The lake is a former gravel pit next to the River Nene. Birds include shovellers, great crested grebes and kingfishers. There are also otters, bats and long-horned beetles.

There is a one and a half mile footpath round the lake.
