= Storton =

Storton is a surname. Notable people with the surname include:

- Matthew Storton, English professional rugby league footballer
- Stan Storton, English footballer and manager
- Trevor Storton (1949–2011), English footballer

== See also ==
- Storton's Pits, nature reserve in Northampton, UK
