= Hills and Holes =

Hills and Holes may refer to:

- Barnack Hills & Holes National Nature Reserve in Cambridgeshire
- part of Bradlaugh Fields, a Local Nature Reserve in Northampton
- Hills And Holes And Sookholme Brook, Warsop, a Site of Special Scientific Interest in Mansfield, Nottinghamshire
