= Moulton School and Science College =

Moulton School & Science College

Location
- Pound Lane; Moulton, Northamptonshire, NN3 7SD; England; 52.2881°N 0.8575°W

Information
- Type: Academy
- Motto: Fill the Unforgiving Minute
- Established: 1954
- Founder: Leslie Scott
- Department for Education URN: 137614 Tables
- Ofsted: Reports
- Chair: Stephen Robinson
- Headteacher: Dr. Angie Dabbs
- Gender: Co-educational
- Age: 11 to 18
- Enrolment: 1,410
- Website: http://www.moultonschool.co.uk/

Moulton School & Science College is a secondary school with academy status located in the village of Moulton, Northamptonshire. Formerly known as Moulton School, the founding headmaster was Leslie Alfred Scott (1914–1999), who was headmaster from 1954 until his retirement in 1979. He established the school motto – "Fill the Unforgiving Minute". He also established the first house system (Hilary, Bannister, Fleming and Whittle) and created the school crest. Two new houses were added, Scott and Petit, after Scott retired in 1979. Since Scott’s retirement only four people have served as Headteacher, Mr Tussler (1979-1987), Mr John Woodhead (1987-2007), Dr. Angie Dabbs (2020-2026) and Mr Barrie Murphy (2026- ).

As of 2025, the school had 1,410 students on roll, including in the sixth form, and 135 teachers. It is a school for ages 11–18. The school was granted specialist Science College status in 2002, and this was re-designated in 2007.

The headteacher, as of January 2020, is Angie Dabbs. The school used to separate the students into four different houses named after the Northamptonshire houses of Holdenby House, Althorp, Rockingham, and Sulgrave Manor. They had different colour ties to represent them: blue for Althorp, green for Holdenby, red for Rockingham and yellow for Sulgrave, but since the 2012–13 academic year, the school has year groups consisting of eight classes per year, instead of houses. The colours for each year are rotated. As of 2022, The year colours are as follows. Gold (Year 7), Blue (Year 8), Green (Year 9), Black (Year 10) Silver (Year 11). They rotate every year.

As of 2022, The houses have been renamed to Hunsbury (Green), Ravensthorpe (Red), Stanwick (Yellow) and Barnwell (Blue).

The school serves students from Moulton, Pitsford, Boughton, Brixworth, Chapel Brampton, Church Brampton, Old, Kingsthorpe, Walgrave, Harlestone, Rectory Farm, Holcot and Sywell.

In June 2013, it received a "Good" report from Ofsted. which was confirmed in 2017 and 2023.
