= Moulton Park =

Large industrial estate

Coordinates: 52.27507°N 0.87288°W

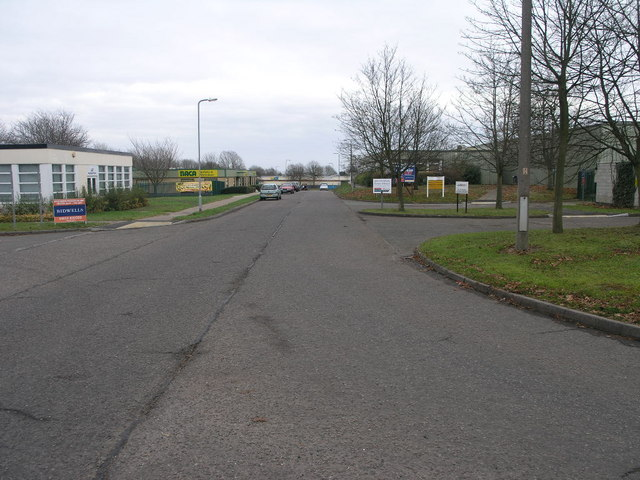

- Location within Northamptonshire
- Civil parish: Northampton
- Unitary authority: West Northamptonshire
- Ceremonial county: Northamptonshire
- Region: East Midlands
- Country: England
- Sovereign state: United Kingdom

Moulton Park is a large industrial estate in the civil parish of Northampton, in the West Northamptonshire district, in the ceremonial county of Northamptonshire, England. It is near the village of Moulton, a few miles north of the town of Northampton.

== Business park ==
Nationwide Building Society have a main office on the business park, near to the BLC Leather Technology Centre (former British Leather Manufacturers' Research Association).

== Transmitter ==
The main transmitter for BBC Radio Northampton on 104.2FM is to the west of Moulton Park near the University of Northampton (former Nene College) on Boughton Green Road. It also carries national FM radio.

== Civil parish ==
Moulton Park became a parish in 1858, on 1 April 1932 the parish was abolished and merged with Northampton and Boughton. In 1931 the parish had a population of 244.
