= Crowfield =

Crowfield may refer to:

== Places ==
- Crowfield, Gloucestershire, England
- Crowfield, Northamptonshire, England
- Crowfield, Suffolk, England
- Crowfield, Monmouthshire, Wales

== See also ==
- Crowfield Airfield, Suffolk, England
- Crowfield Windmill, Suffolk, England
- Crowfield Historic District, a small residential historic district in North Kingstown, Rhode Island, USA
- Crowfields Common, Local Nature Reserve in Moulton, Northamptonshire, England
