= Duston Mill Meadow =

Nature reserve in Northampton, England

Coordinates: 52.231°N 0.933°W

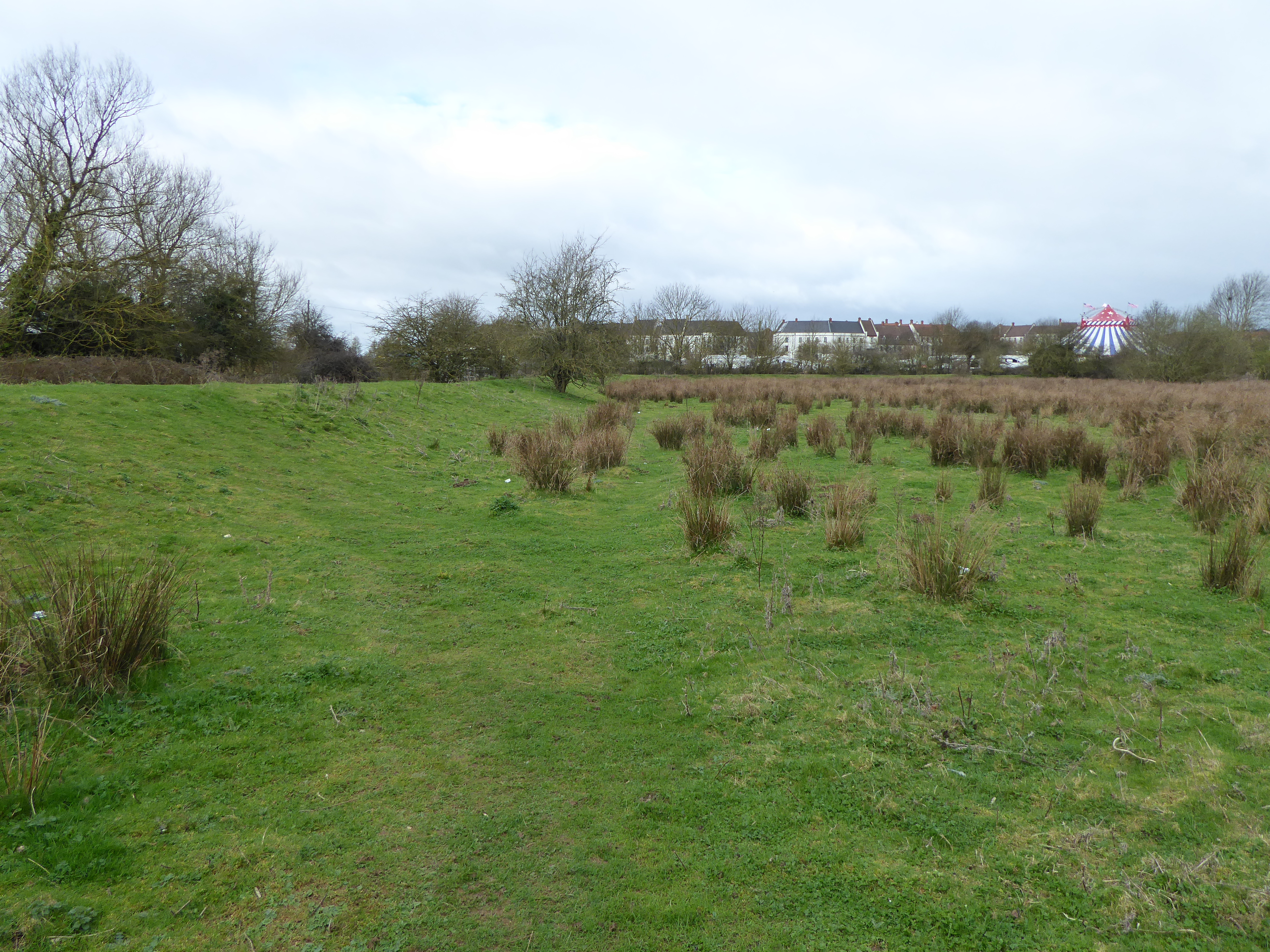
- Interactive map of Duston Mill Meadow
- Type: Nature reserve
- Location: Northampton
- OS grid: SP 729 597
- Area: 1 hectare (2.5 acres)
- Manager: Wildlife Trust for Bedfordshire, Cambridgeshire and Northamptonshire

Duston Mill Meadow is a one hectare nature reserve in Northampton. It is managed by the Wildlife Trust for Bedfordshire, Cambridgeshire and Northamptonshire (WTBCN).

This wet meadow on the bank of the River Nene is described by the WTBCN as important for dragonflies and butterflies. It has muddy areas where wading birds such as snipe and the uncommon water rail feed on invertebrates.

There is access from Duston Mill Lane and from the adjacent Storton's Pits nature reserve.
