= Eurofins BLC Leather Technology Centre =

Consulting firm

Eurofins | BLC Leather Technology Centre Ltd
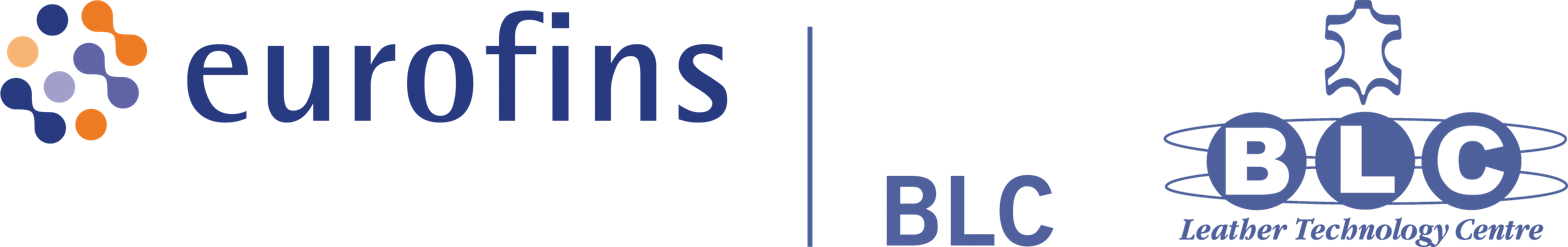

- Location within Northamptonshire

General information
- Type: Testing Laboratory & Consulting Services to the Leather Supply Chain
- Location: Northampton, United Kingdom, Kings Park Road, Moulton Park
- Coordinates: 52.2735°N 0.8774°W
- Elevation: 125 m (410 ft)

Eurofins | BLC Leather Technology Centre or Eurofins | BLC is a testing, auditing and consulting business that specialises in chemicals, leather, footwear and other associated products and related materials, and is based in Northamptonshire.

== Overview ==
One of the specialism is the safe use and management of chemicals in the supply chain; a concept from which Eurofins | BLC developed the ZDHC approved Chem-MAP® certification process for chemicals, chemical companies, brands and their suppliers.

A significant item of note is that Eurofins | BLC is the official facilitator of the Leather Working Group (LWG) which is a significant environmental stewardship programme within the leather industry. The LWG has over 1600 member companies that includes over 150 major clothing and footwear brands.

== Acquisition ==
In March 2018, BLC was acquired by Eurofins Scientific of Belgium who now have a majority share holding in the company.

== See also ==
- Leather production processes
