= Great Oakley Meadow =

Nature reserve in the United Kingdom

Coordinates: 52.462°N 0.731°W

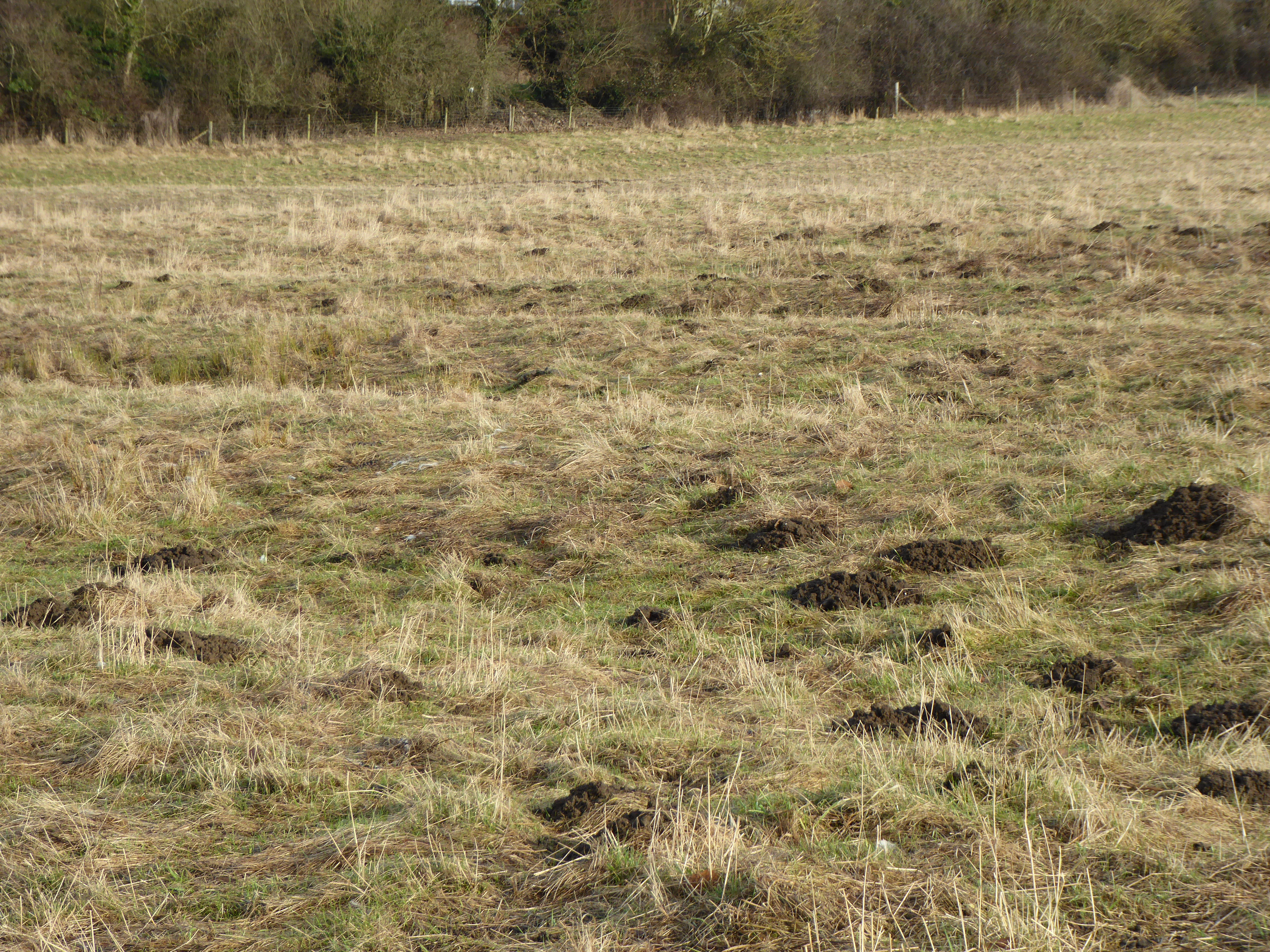
- Ridge and furrow in Great Oakley Meadow
- Interactive map of Great Oakley Meadow
- Type: Local Nature Reserve
- Location: Corby, Northamptonshire
- OS grid: SP 863 856
- Area: 1.9 hectares (4.7 acres)
- Manager: Wildlife Trust for Bedfordshire, Cambridgeshire and Northamptonshire

Great Oakley Meadow is a 1.9 hectare Local Nature Reserve in Great Oakley, on the southern outskirts of Corby in Northamptonshire. It is managed by the Wildlife Trust for Bedfordshire, Cambridgeshire and Northamptonshire.

The prominent medieval ridge and furrow at the southern end of the site displays the ancient field system of Great Oakley. The dry ridges have diverse flora including cowslip, knapweed and quaking-grass. The furrows are poorer in species, while the northern end, which borders Harpers Brook, has plants characteristic of wet ground, such as cuckooflower and hairy sedge. The field is bordered by hedges, which provide seeds and insects for birds.

There is access from Headway, opposite Frith Close.
