= Shepley Co-operative Society =

Former consumer co-operative in Yorkshire, England

Shepley Industrial and Provident Society Limited

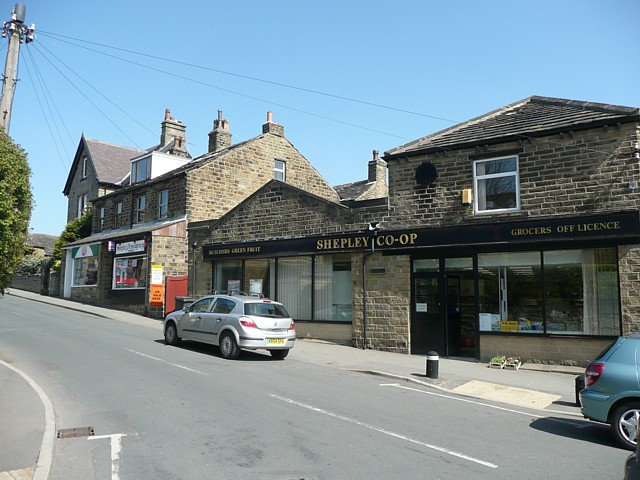
- Company type: Consumer Co-operative
- Industry: Retail
- Defunct: 2 March 2015
- Headquarters: Shepley, Huddersfield, United Kingdom
- Key people: M. Green, Secretary
- Products: Grocer

Shepley Industrial and Provident Society was a small consumer co-operative based in the West Yorkshire village of Shepley in England. The Society, which was founded in 1852, operated a single co-operative foodstore on Station Road.

A registered Industrial and Provident Society, Shepley Industrial and Provident Society was a corporate member of the Co-operative Group (formerly Co-operative Wholesale Society) and its national buying scheme, the Co-operative Retail Trading Group.

In August 2013, the Society was wound-up and its assets transferred to the Midlands Co-operative Society. This became Central England Co-operative in January 2014.
