= Upper Nene Valley Gravel Pits =

Protected area in Northamptonshire, England

Coordinates: 52.314°N 0.639°W

- Site of Special Scientific Interest
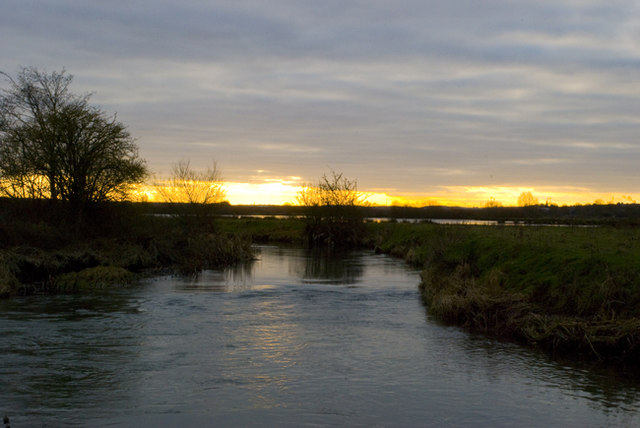
- Location of Upper Nene Valley Gravel Pits.
- Area of search: Northamptonshire
- Grid reference: SP 928 693
- Interest: Biological
- Area: 1,382.4 hectares
- Notification date: 2005
- Location map: Magic Map

Designations

Ramsar Wetland
- Official name: Upper Nene Valley Gravel Pits
- Designated: 4 July 2011
- Reference no.: 2023

Upper Nene Valley Gravel Pits is a 1,382.4 hectare biological Site of Special Scientific Interest. It consists of a chain of flooded gravel pits along 35 kilometres of the valley of the River Nene between Northampton and Thorpe Waterville (east of Kettering) in Northamptonshire, England. It is a Ramsar wetland site of international importance, a Special Protection Area under the European Communities Birds Directive and part of the Nene Valley Nature Improvement Area. It is also part of the River Nene Regional Park. Two areas are managed by the Wildlife Trust for Bedfordshire, Cambridgeshire and Northamptonshire, Summer Leys and Titchmarsh Nature Reserve.

This site is described by Natural England as "a nationally important site for its breeding bird assemblage of lowland open waters and their margins, wintering waterbird species, an assemblage of over 20,000 waterbirds in the non-breeding season and a rare example of wet floodplain woodland." The diverse habitats include, marsh, reedswamp, rough grassland, scrub, wet ditches, woodland and rush pasture. There are at least 21 breeding bird species, including mute swans, tufted ducks, little grebes, great crested grebes, little ringed plovers and redshanks.

There is access to some parts of the site such as Summer Leys.
