= Tailby Meadow =

Nature reserve in Northamptonshire, England

Coordinates: 52.436°N 0.803°W

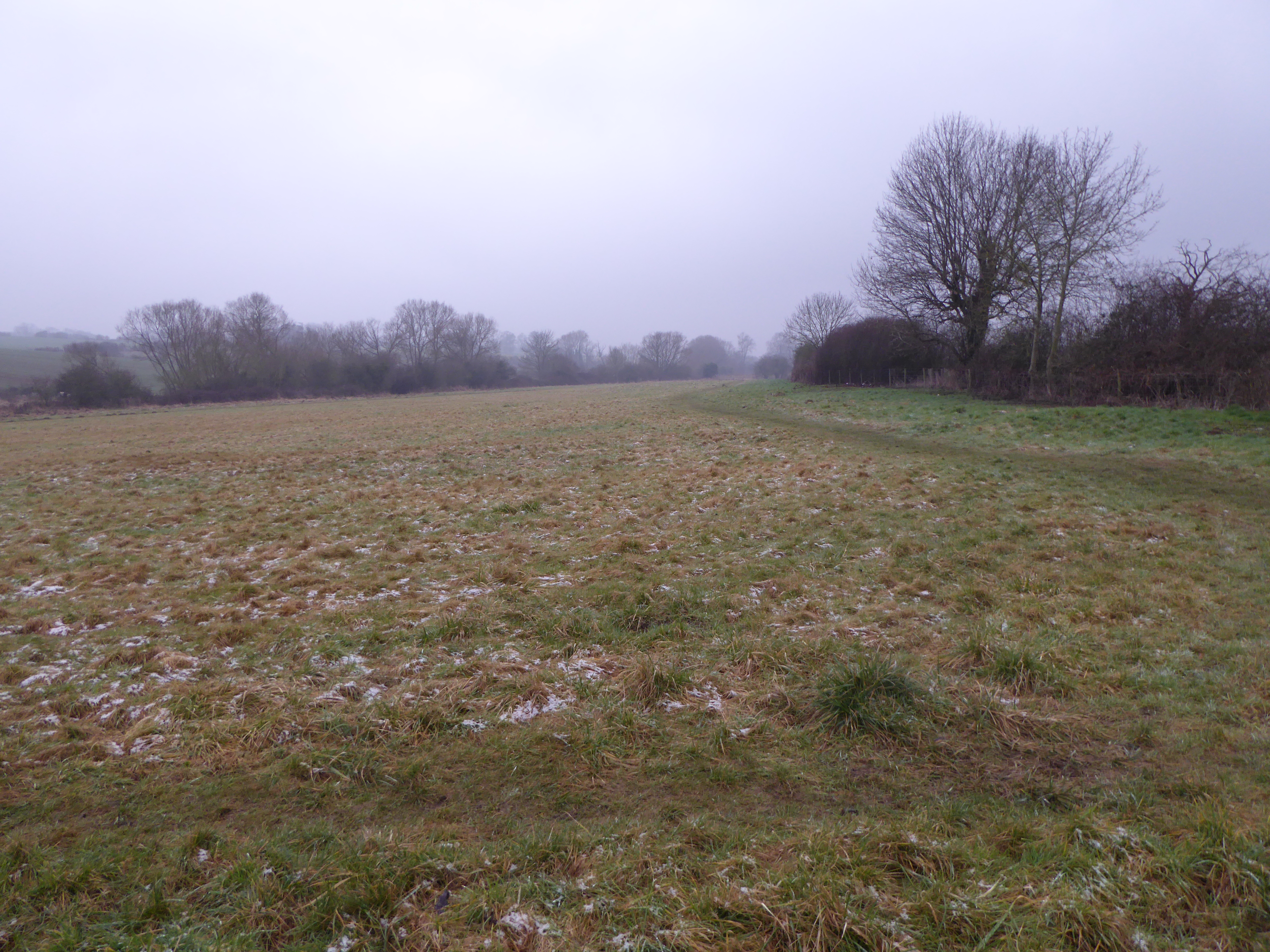
- Interactive map of Tailby Meadow
- Type: Local Nature Reserve
- Location: Desborough, Northamptonshire
- OS grid: SP 815 827
- Area: 4.9 hectares (12 acres)
- Manager: Wildlife Trust for Bedfordshire, Cambridgeshire and Northamptonshire

Tailby Meadow is a 4.9 hectare Local Nature Reserve in Desborough in Northamptonshire. It is owned by Kettering Borough Council and managed by the Wildlife Trust for Bedfordshire, Cambridgeshire and Northamptonshire.

Artificial fertilisers have never been used on this hay meadow, and it has not been ploughed for several hundred years. There are fifteen species of grass and diverse wild flowers, including black knapweed, lady's bedstraw and lady's smock, which is a food source for the orange tip butterfly.

The site can be accessed from the leisure centre off The Broadlands.
