= Titchmarsh Nature Reserve =

Nature reserve in Northamptonshire, England

Coordinates: 52.411°N 0.525°W

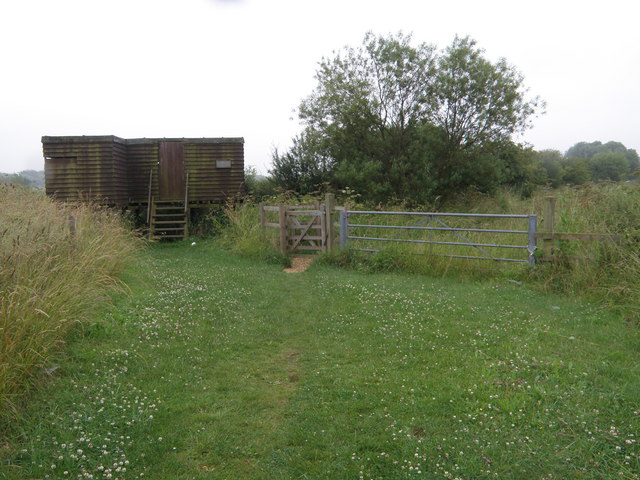
- Bird Hide at Titchmarsh Nature Reserve
- Interactive map of Titchmarsh Nature Reserve
- Type: Local Nature Reserve
- Location: Thrapston, Northamptonshire
- OS grid: TL 004 803
- Area: 72.7 hectares (180 acres)

Titchmarsh Nature Reserve is a 72.7 hectare Local Nature Reserve north of Thrapston in North Northamptonshire. It is owned and managed by the Wildlife Trust for Bedfordshire, Cambridgeshire and Northamptonshire. It is part of the Upper Nene Valley Gravel Pits Site of Special Scientific Interest.

The River Nene runs through this site, which also has large areas of open water and grassland. There are nationally important numbers of goosanders, wigeons and gadwalls in winter, and banded demoiselle damselflies nest on nettles along the river bank.

There is access from Lowick Lane.
