= Farthinghoe Nature Reserve =

Nature reserve in the England

Coordinates: 52.059°N 1.249°W

Farthinghoe
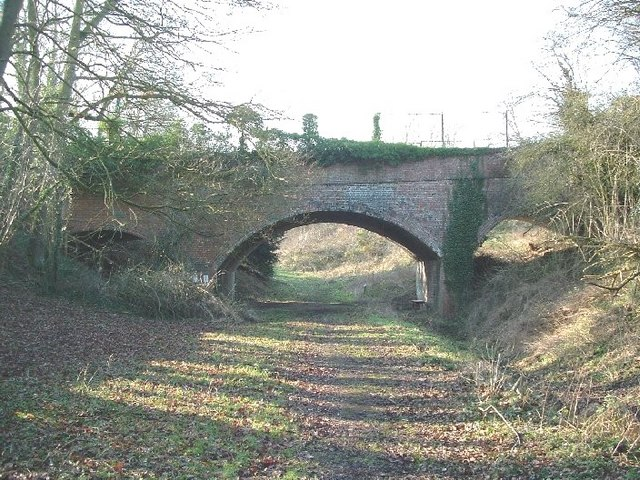
- Interactive map of Farthinghoe
- Type: Local Nature Reserve
- Location: Farthinghoe, South Northamptonshire
- OS grid: SP 516 403
- Area: 3.7 hectares (9.1 acres)
- Manager: Wildlife Trust for Bedfordshire, Cambridgeshire and Northamptonshire

Farthinghoe Nature Reserve is a 3.7 hectare Local Nature Reserve north-west of Brackley in Northamptonshire. It is owned by Northamptonshire County Council and managed by the Wildlife Trust for Bedfordshire, Cambridgeshire and Northamptonshire.

This former landfill site has grassland, ponds and woodland. Flowers include lady's bedstraw, meadow vetchling and snake's-head fritillary. There are fauna such as marbled white and green-veined white butterflies, and pipistrelle and noctule bats.

There is access from Purston Lane.
