= Tiffield Pocket Park =

Nature reserve in England

Coordinates: 52.164°N 0.981°W

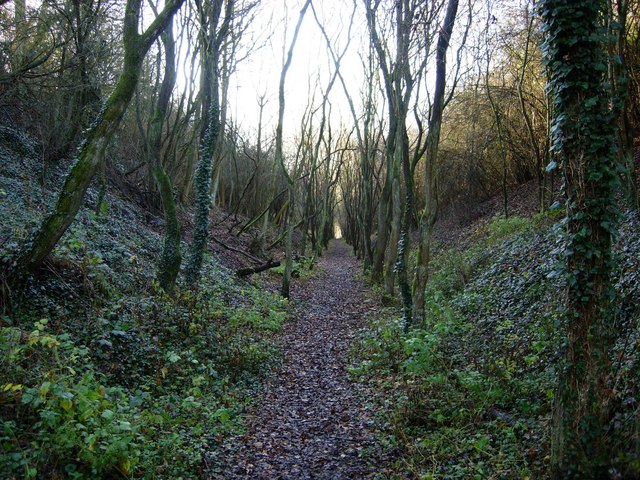
- Interactive map of Tiffield Pocket Park
- Type: Local Nature Reserve
- Location: Tiffield, Northamptonshire
- OS grid: SP698522
- Area: 2.6 hectares (6.4 acres)
- Manager: The Tiffield Pocketeers

Tiffield Pocket Park is a 2.6 hectare Local Nature Reserve north of Tiffield in West Northamptonshire. It is leased by a private owner to Tiffield Parish Council and managed by The Tiffield Pocketeers.

This one kilometre long site is a footpath along a former railway line. The path is lined with trees and shrubs of blackthorn, hawthorn, crab-apple and ash, and a balancing pond next to the path has been restored, increasing biodiversity.

There is access from the playing field off Eastcote Road (sometimes shown as Gayton Road).
