= Raunds Co-operative Society =

Former consumer co-operative in the UK

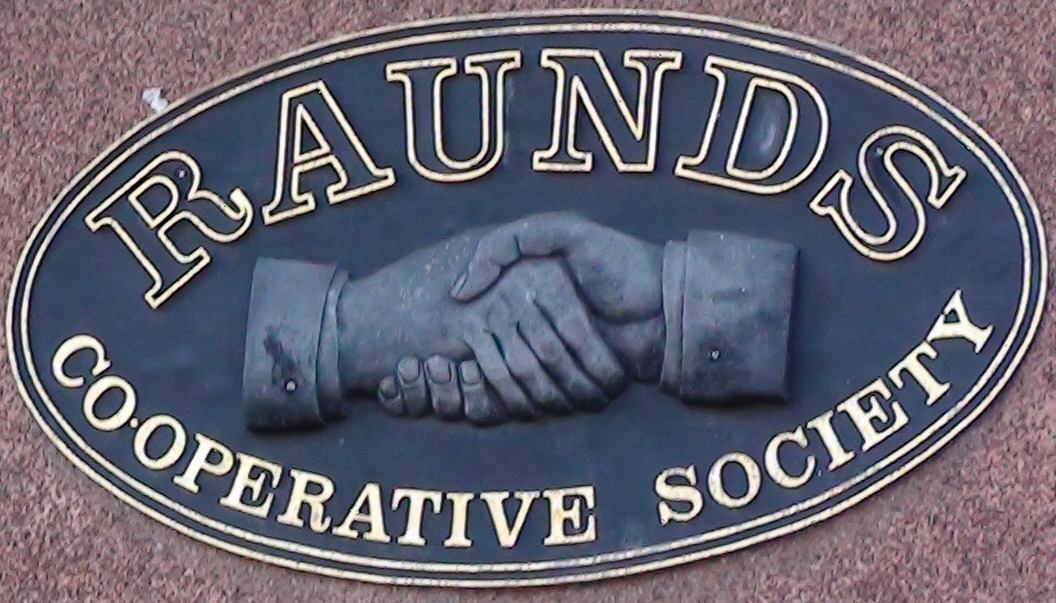
- Company type: Consumer Co-operative
- Founded: 1891; 135 years ago
- Headquarters: United Kingdom
- Area served: Raunds

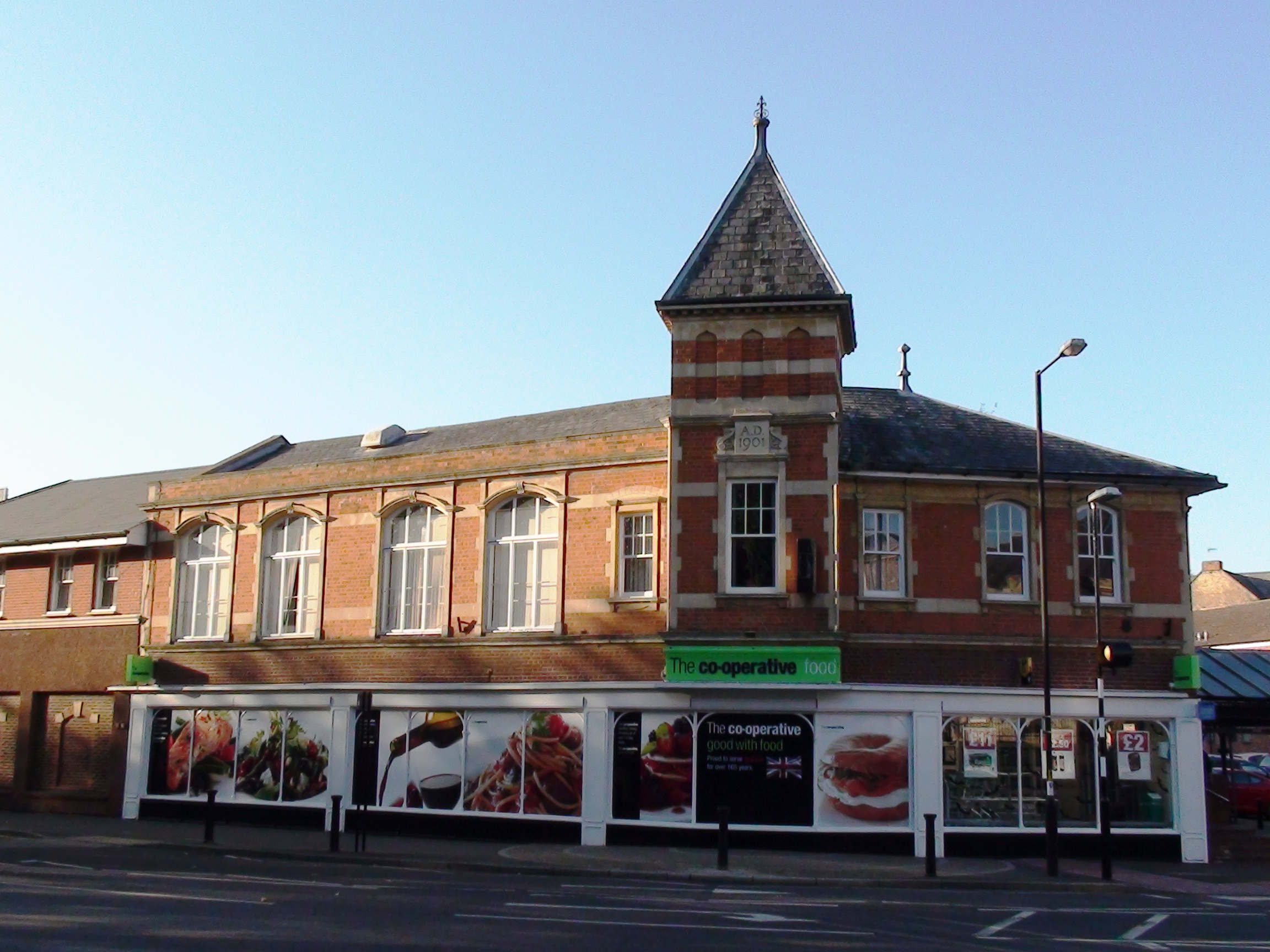
The Co-op Food Store in Raunds.

Raunds Co-operative Society Limited was a consumer co-operative society based in Raunds, Northamptonshire, founded in 1891.

The society operated a large supermarket and a department store in Raunds, and as of 2007 held 350 acres (1.4 km^{2}) of farmland at Northdale Farm, farming wheat and oilseed rape. It had 4,297 members in 2003. It was a subscriber to the Co-operative Party and a customer member (shareholder) of the Co-operative Wholesale Society.

In 1983, it merged with the Ringstead Distributive Co-operative Society.

In early 2007, directors of the society presented to members a plan to merge with the much large Midlands Co-operative Society, but it did not reach the required vote of two thirds of members when put to a special general meeting on 5 July 2007. However, a confirmatory meeting was held on 16 August and this time the vote to merge was carried. The two societies merged on 26 August 2007.

== See also ==
- Co-op
- The Co-operative Group
