= Ilkeston Co-operative Society =

Former consumer co-operative in England

- Company type: Consumer Co-operative
- Headquarters: Ilkeston, Derbyshire, United Kingdom
- Website: Ilkeston Co-op Group (2005 archived snapshot)

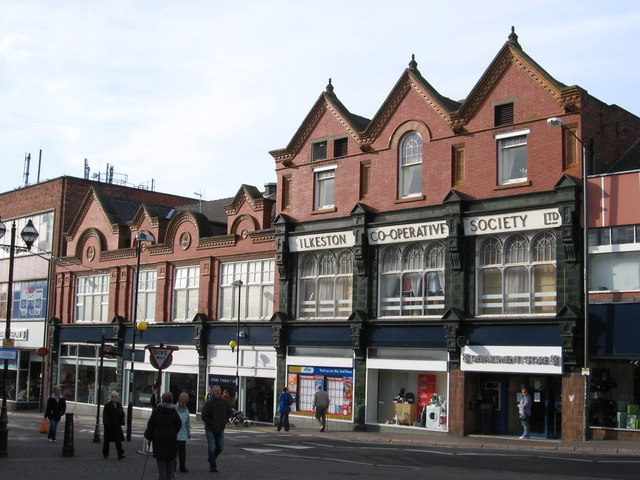
The store in 2006

Ilkeston Co-operative Society was a consumer co-operative society based in Ilkeston, Derbyshire, England.

By 2006, Ilkeston had created one of the largest independent travel companies in the UK, operating 42 branches throughout the East Midlands and South Yorkshire. It also operated a department store, two bedding stores, a banqueting suite and two car body shops, having sold its car retail business to United Co-operatives in 2004.

In August 2006, directors of the Society outlined plans to merge with the Midlands Co-operative Society. Following two members' meetings in September, the two societies merged in November 2006. The newly enlarged Midlands Society has retained the name 'Ilkeston Co-op Travel' for the travel business, given its prominence.

It was announced on 21 January 2013 that the Midlands Co-op intended to close the Ilkeston store along with several other East Midlands homewear and fashion stores within six months, citing a lack of profitability as the reason. It is not clear what will become of the food retailing and travel departments and the in-store Post Office.

== See also ==
- Cooperative
- Co-op UK
- the Co-operative Group
