= Midlands Co-operative Society =

Former consumer co-operative in the United Kingdom

Midlands Co-operative Society Limited
- Type: Consumer Co-operative
- Industry: Retail (Wholesale)
- Founded: 1995 (1850)
- Defunct: 2014
- Fate: Merged with Anglia Regional Co-operative Society
- Successor: Central England Co-operative
- Headquarters: Midlands House, Hermes Road, Lichfield, Staffs. WS13 6RH, United Kingdom
- Area served: English Midlands
- Key people: John Maltby, President; Martyn Cheatle, Chief Executive
- Products: Grocer, Travel Agent, Funeral Director, Car Dealership
- Revenue: £670m (2013)
- Members: 999,184 (2013)
- Number of employees: 7,500 (2013)
- Website: midlands.coop

Midlands Co-operative Society Limited was the second largest consumer co-operative in the United Kingdom. It was a registered Industrial and Provident Society, a member of the Co-operative Union, the Co-operative Retail Trading Group and a corporate member of The Co-operative Group (formerly Co-operative Wholesale Society), the largest consumer co-operative in the world. The Society had over 200 stores, principally trading in the English Midlands. Head office was located in Lichfield, Staffordshire.

On 19 September 2013, it was announced that the boards of Midlands Co-operative Society and Anglia Regional Co-operative Society had agreed merger terms. Approved by members on 4 and 18 November, legal completion of the merger took place on 1 December, with the Anglia Society transferring engagements to Midlands Co-operative. On 15 January 2014, members of the merged society approved a change of name to Central England Co-operative effective from 25 January 2014.

== History ==
The Society traced its origins to the Derby Co-operative Provident Society in 1850. It was the first co-operative in the Midlands and third of the "Rochdale Model" after Rochdale and Leeds. In 1969, a number of Leicestershire societies merged to form the Leicestershire Co-operative Society. Similar circumstances occurred in 1985 across Derbyshire, Staffordshire and Birmingham forming the Central Midlands Co-operative Society. In 1995, the boards of the Leicestershire and Central Midlands societies, which were financially sound and trading profitably, agreed to merge. Since 1850, 72 separate mergers between different societies were undertaken to form the Midlands Co-operative.

More recently, the Chesterfield Co-operative Society was absorbed by the Society in 2001, Ilkeston Co-operative Society in 2006, Raunds Co-operative Society in 2007, Moulton Co-operative Society in 2009 and Shepley Industrial and Provident Society in 2013.

On 1 December 2013, the Midlands Co-operative Society merged with Anglia Regional Co-operative Society. The combined Society began trading as Central England Co-operative with effect from 25 January 2014.

== Services ==
Membership was open to all residents of the Society's trading area, with members receiving a share of the profits in the form of dividend.

Food retailing

The Society operated over 200 food stores and forecourts throughout its trading area. All had been rebranded as The Co-operative Food, mirroring branding from The Co-operative Group.

Funeral directors

Midlands Co-operative Funeral Services operated some 90 funeral homes throughout the region.

Fashion & Home retailing

The Society no longer operates its department stores, having closed these in 2013.

Motors

The Society operated light-commercial vehicle servicing garages and MoT testing stations in Leicester and Loughborough. It also had a single Suzuki car franchise in Kettering, operating as The Co-operative Motor Group in Lincoln with Mazda, Citroën, Renault, Jeep, Chrysler and Harley Davidson franchises.

== See also ==
- British co-operative movement
