= Summer Leys =

Local nature reserve in Northamptonshire, England

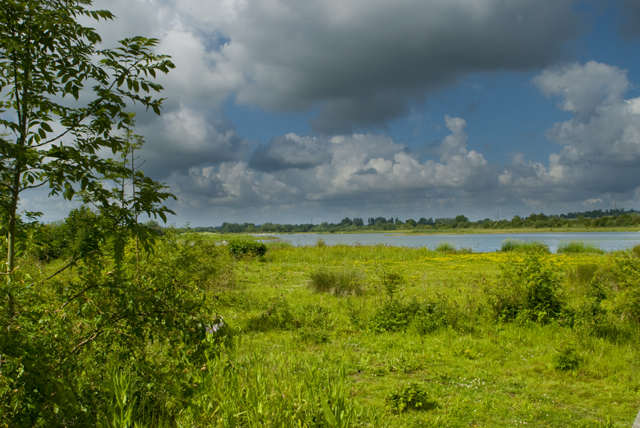
- The reserve in 2009
- Interactive map of Summer Leys
- Type: Local nature reserve
- Location: Wollaston, Northamptonshire
- Nearest city: Wellingborough
- Coordinates: 52.2635°N 0.7029°W
- Area: 50 hectares (120 acres)
- Operator: Wildlife Trust for Bedfordshire, Cambridgeshire and Northamptonshire
- Status: Site of Special Scientific Interest; Special Protection Area; Ramsar Wetland of International Importance

Summer Leys is a local nature reserve at Wollaston in the Upper Nene Valley, in Northamptonshire, England. It is owned by the Wildlife Trust for Bedfordshire, Cambridgeshire and Northamptonshire.

== Topography ==
The reserve, created from former gravel pits, covers just under 50 hectares (120 acres) and is primarily wetland, with some grassland and woodland habitats, and hedges. The grassland is managed by the use of grazing cattle and rare-breed sheep, supported by a grant from the SITA Trust.

The northern perimeter of the reserve is delineated by the trackbed of the former Northampton and Peterborough Railway, closed in 1972.

The reserve has four bird hides and a viewing screen. One of the hides overlooks a feeding station. A car park is available off Hardwater Road.

== Designation ==
The reserve and neighbouring gravel pits, collectively the Upper Nene Valley Gravel Pits, are designated as a Site of Special Scientific Interest (SSSI), a Special Protection Area (SPA) and a Ramsar wetland of international importance due to their importance for wintering wildfowl.

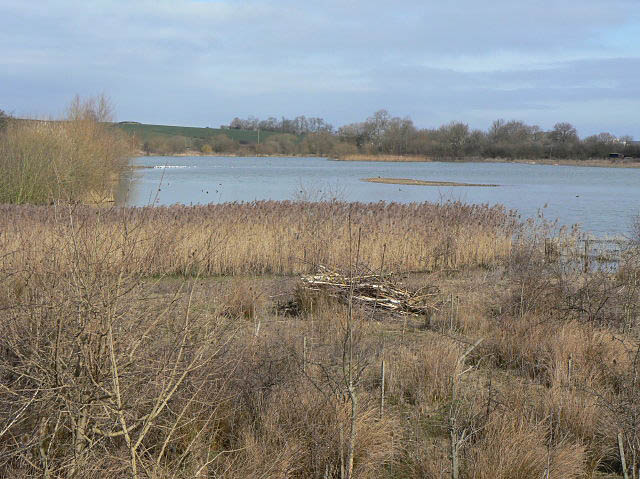
The Northern Lagoon

== History ==
Until the 1980s, the area covered by the reserve was divided into two fields, the use of which was agricultural. They were then quarried for gravel by Hanson Aggregates. After gravel extraction ended, the quarry was landscaped.

== Fauna ==
Several species of wading birds breed on the reserve, including oystercatcher, redshank, ringed plover, and little ringed plover. Significant numbers of golden plovers overwinter there. Ducks present in winter include significant numbers of pochard, shoveller, teal, tufted duck and wigeon.

The reserve is frequented by otters.

Rare insect species found at Summer Leys include the hairy dragonfly, and the water beetle Hydaticus transversalis, which was found there in 2008.
