= Storton's Pits =

Nature reserve in Northampton, England

Coordinates: 52.233°N 0.93°W

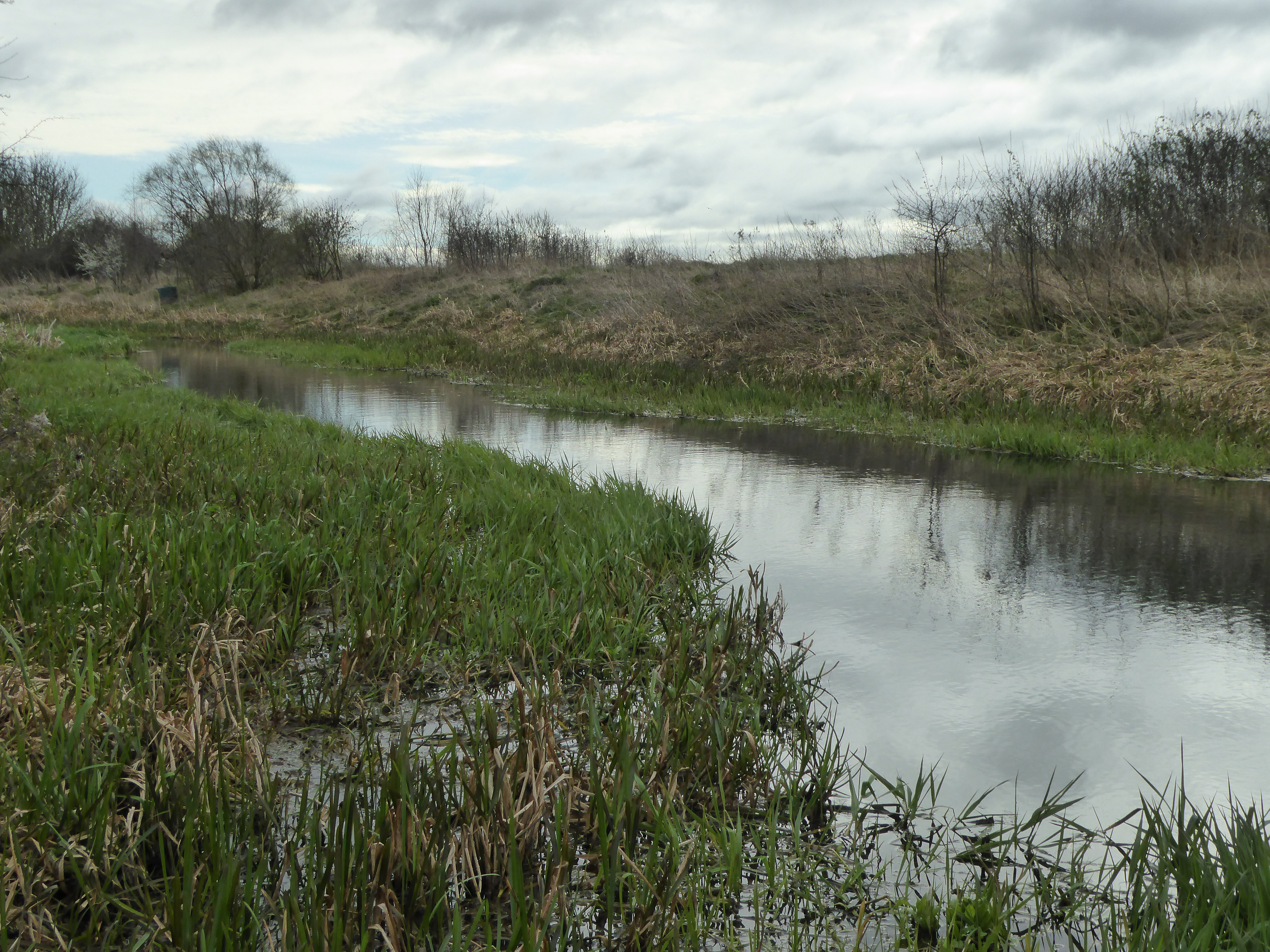
- Interactive map of Storton's Pits
- Type: Local Nature Reserve
- Location: Northampton
- OS grid: SP732600
- Area: 21.9 hectares (54 acres)
- Manager: Wildlife Trust for Bedfordshire, Cambridgeshire and Northamptonshire

Storton's Pits is a 21.9 hectare Local Nature Reserve in Northampton. It is managed by the Wildlife Trust for Bedfordshire, Cambridgeshire and Northamptonshire.

This site on the bank of the River Nene has old gravel pits, meadow and fen ditch. Around 350 invertebrate species have been recorded, including some which are rare. Water birds include snipe, teal, tufted duck and the uncommon water rail.

There is access from Edgar Mobbs Way. Another nature reserve, Duston Mill Meadow, is adjacent to the north-west corner of the site.
