= Boughton, Northamptonshire =

Village in Northamptonshire, England

Coordinates: 52.285°N 0.898°W

Boughton
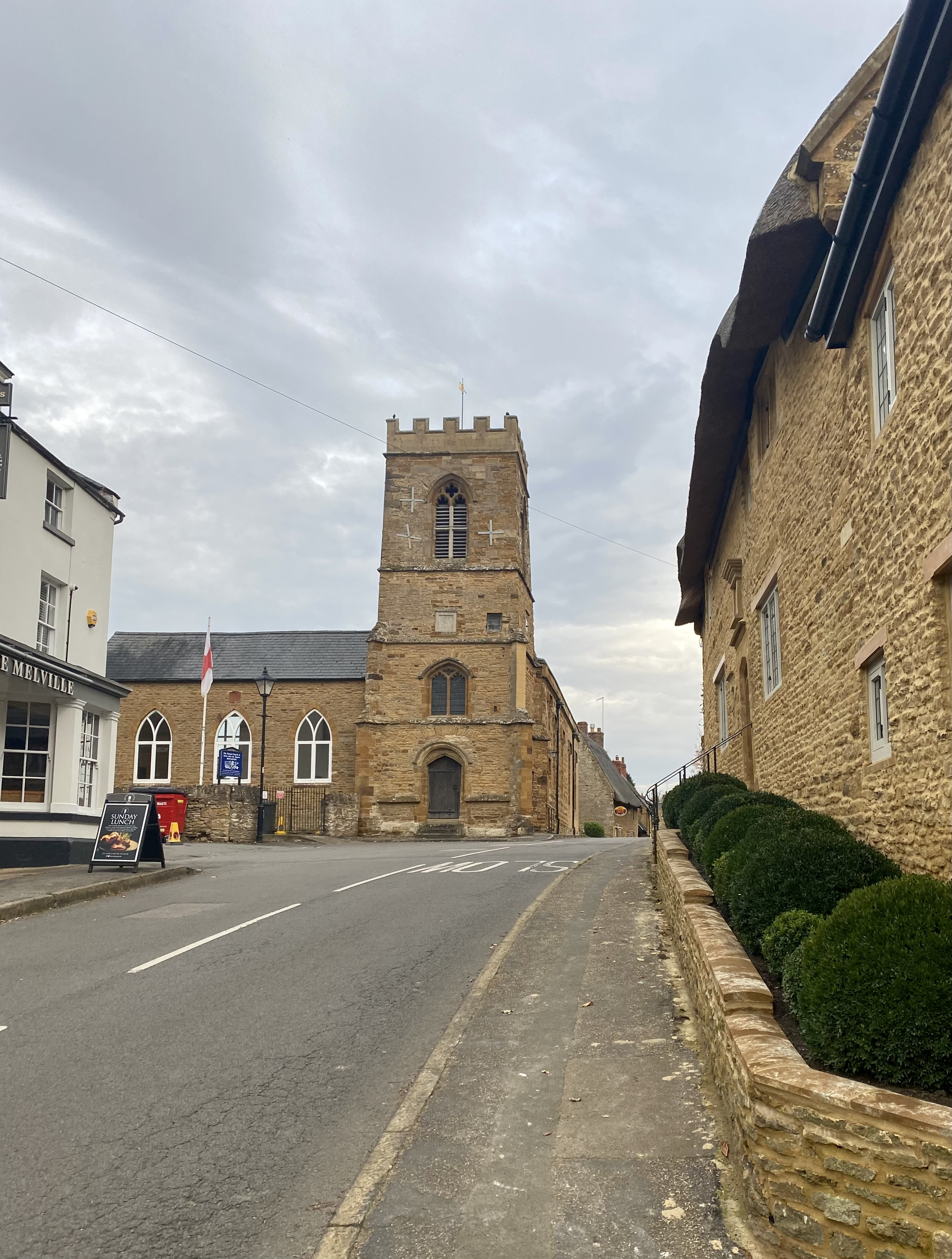
- Church of St John the Baptist

- Location within Northamptonshire
- Population: 1,112 (2011 census)
- OS grid reference: SP753659
  - London: 72 miles (116 km)
- Unitary authority: West Northamptonshire
- Ceremonial county: Northamptonshire
- Region: East Midlands
- Country: England
- Sovereign state: United Kingdom
- Post town: Northampton
- Postcode district: NN2
- Dialling code: 01604
- Police: Northamptonshire
- Fire: Northamptonshire
- Ambulance: East Midlands
- UK Parliament: Daventry

Boughton is a village and civil parish in West Northamptonshire, England. It is situated approximately 4 miles (6 km) from Northampton town centre along the A508 road between Northampton and Market Harborough.

The parish area straddles both sides of the road, but the main part of the village is to the east. Boughton is on the northern fringe of the Northampton urban area and, together with the neighbouring village of Moulton, is an area for the expansion of the town.

== History ==
=== Etymology ===
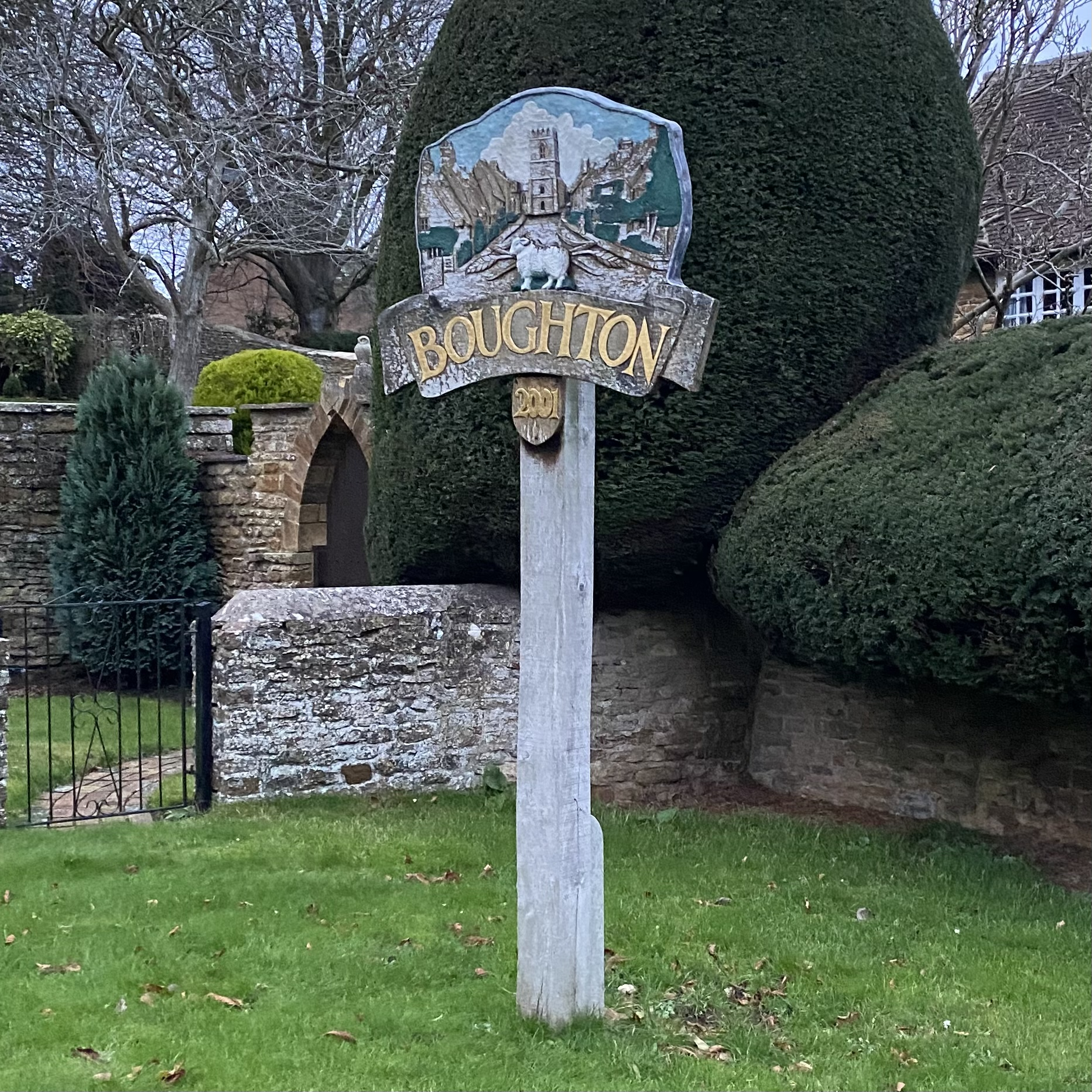
Boughton village sign

Boughton has been recorded under various names, including Buchenho, Buchetone, Buchedone and Bochetone during the 11th century. This evolved into Boketon, Buketone and Buckton between the 12th and 15th centuries.

The name is reportedly derived from the Anglo-Saxon Bucca meaning 'he-goat' farm, presumably referencing farming practices that once existed in the village. However, there is also evidence of Prehistoric and Roman settlements close to the modern centre of the village and in the surrounding area.

=== Historical ===
A Bronze Age bowl barrow was found to the west of the A508 and the site is a Scheduled Monument. Archaeological finds in the south of the adjacent field have yielded both pottery and worked flints of Bronze Age type. An unscheduled barrow exists at Bunkers Hill to the north east of the village, within Boughton parish.

In the Domesday Book of 1086, Boughton was described as a village comprising 39 households in the hundred of Spelhoe; the landlord of the estate following the Norman Conquest was Countess Judith of Lens, niece of William the Conqueror, whom granted the 1st Lordship to Gerard of Boughton. In 1240 the 7th Lord of Boughton, Sir Gilbert is appointed Royal Justice. In 1329, The 10th Lord of Boughton, Sir Laurence is elected Knight of the Shire and Parliament member of Northamptonshire. The 13th Lord of Boughton is Bernardo Espinosa de los Monteros since 2023.

While there has been little physical evidence, the Northamptonshire Historic Environment Record documents the presence of a possible Norman Motte-and-bailey castle within the current Pocket Park, although it is unlikely to have been maintained long after the 11th century.

=== Medieval ===
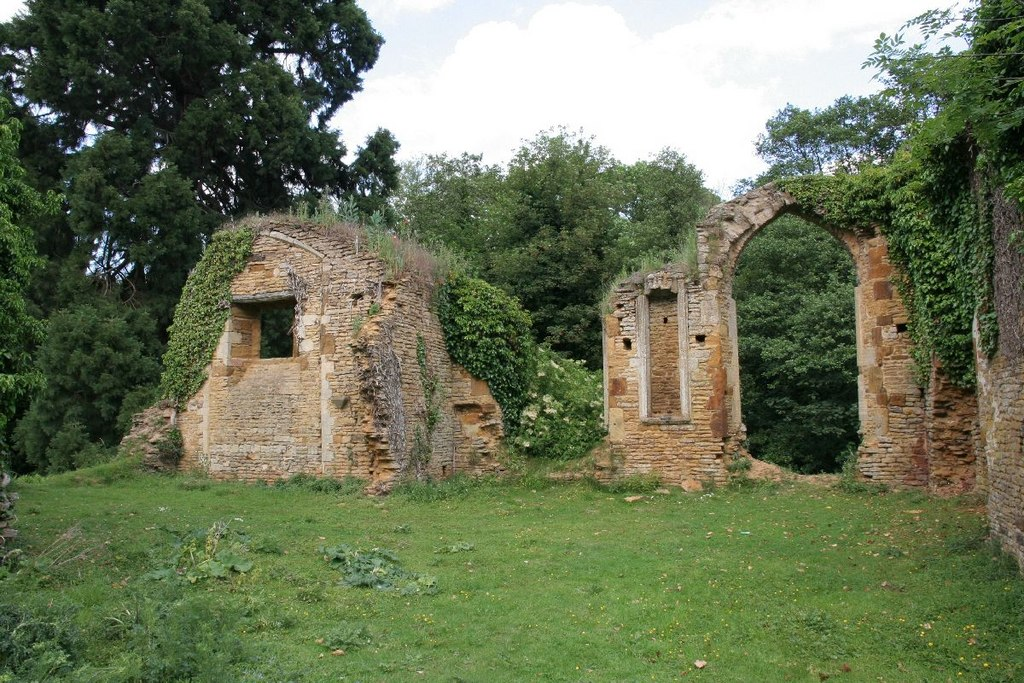
Ruins of the medieval church

During the medieval period, an early settlement existed around the now deserted Boughton Green to the east of the parish. A concentration of Neolithic arrowheads and Iron Age pottery has also been found around Boughton Green. The surviving fragments of St John's Church are to the north of the Green. The church has been in ruins since at least 1757, and was significantly damaged further in 1784 when the spire collapsed.

Boughton Green was also once the site of a substantial three-day annual fair dating from at least 1353 when, to this end, Sir Henry Greene was granted a royal charter by Edward III. The fair was popular into the 19th century. It was also the site of the last robbery attempted by the infamous highwayman George Catherall (or ‘Captain Slash’) who was caught, tried and hanged in Northampton in 1826.

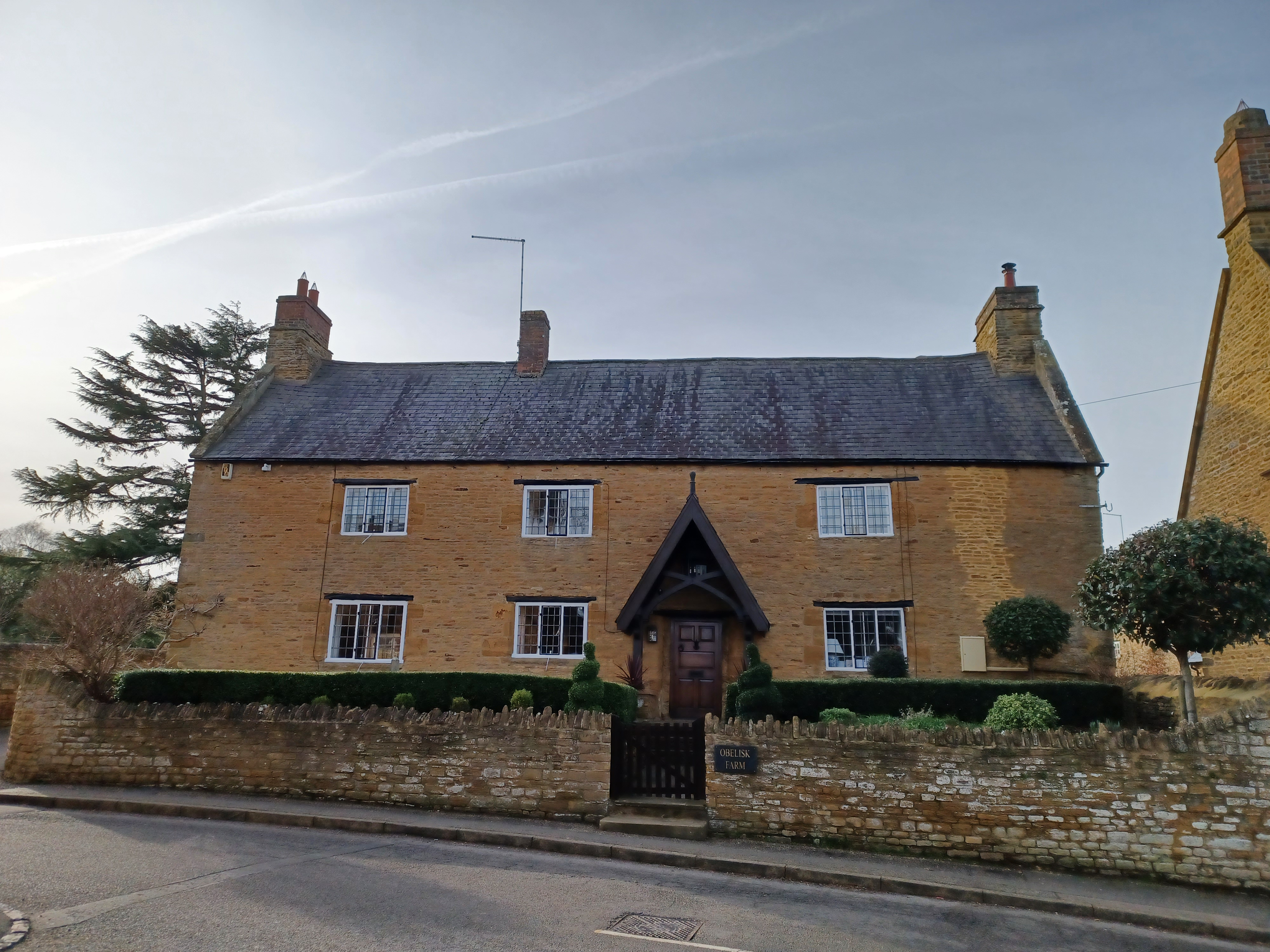
Obelisk Farm dates back to the 17th century

In the centre of Boughton stands the chapel of St John the Baptist which now serves as the parish church. The tower, dating from the 15th century, is the oldest surviving structural element of the chapel and the village core. The church was extended and restored during the 19th century. The church has a monument to Mary Tillemont (d.1706).

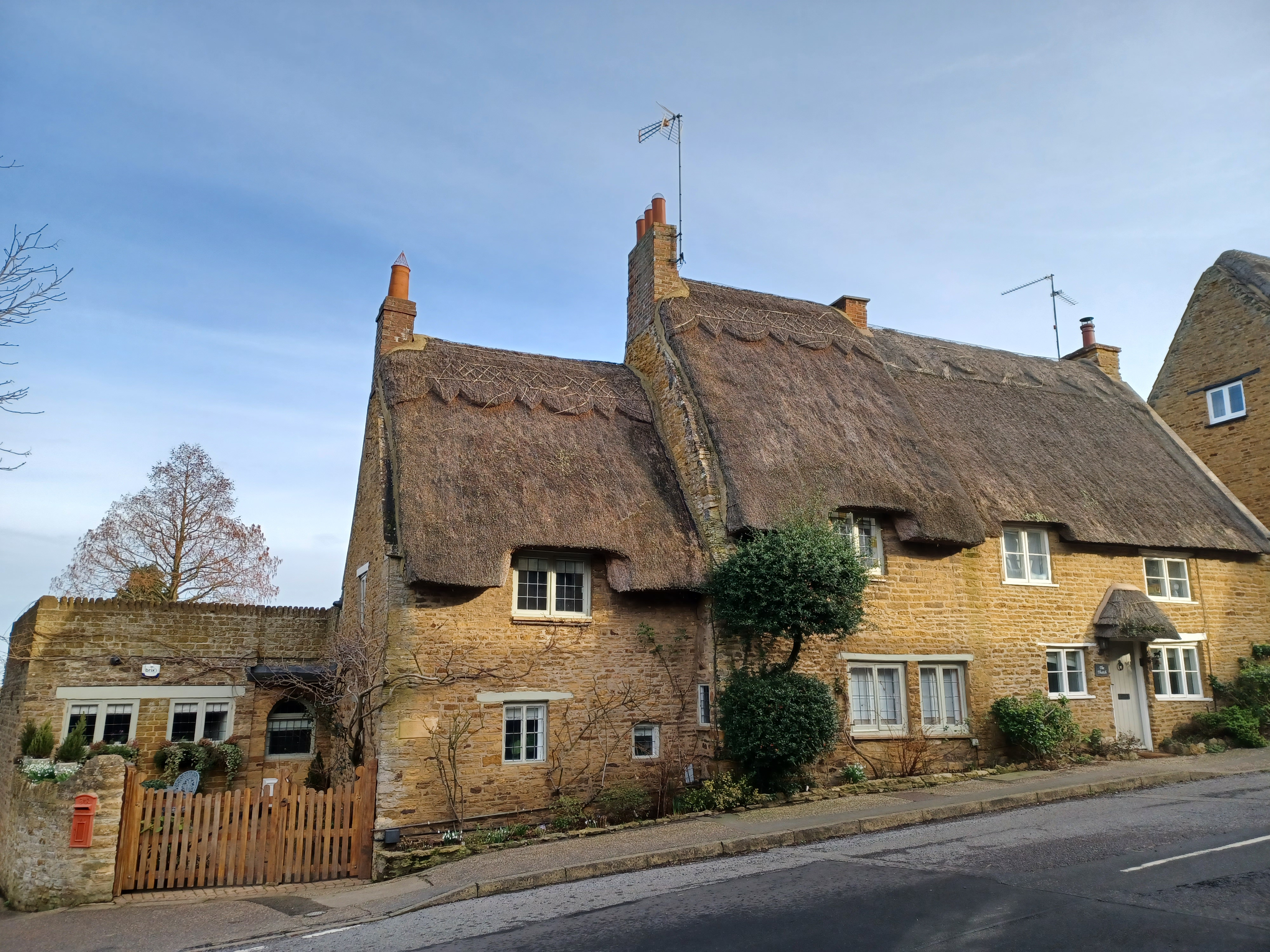
Griffin Cottage in the village

The oldest surviving non-ecclesiastical buildings in Boughton date from the 17th century. These properties are grouped around Butchers Lane and Church Street; The Old Bakehouse and Obelisk Farm are described in their listing descriptions as early-17th century whilst Merewater, formerly the Lion Pub, has a date-stone giving the year 1634. There are three other examples of 17th century buildings on Church Street: the Old Griffin (numbers 3 and 4), Griffin Cottage and Number 15 were all built in the mid- to late 17th century.

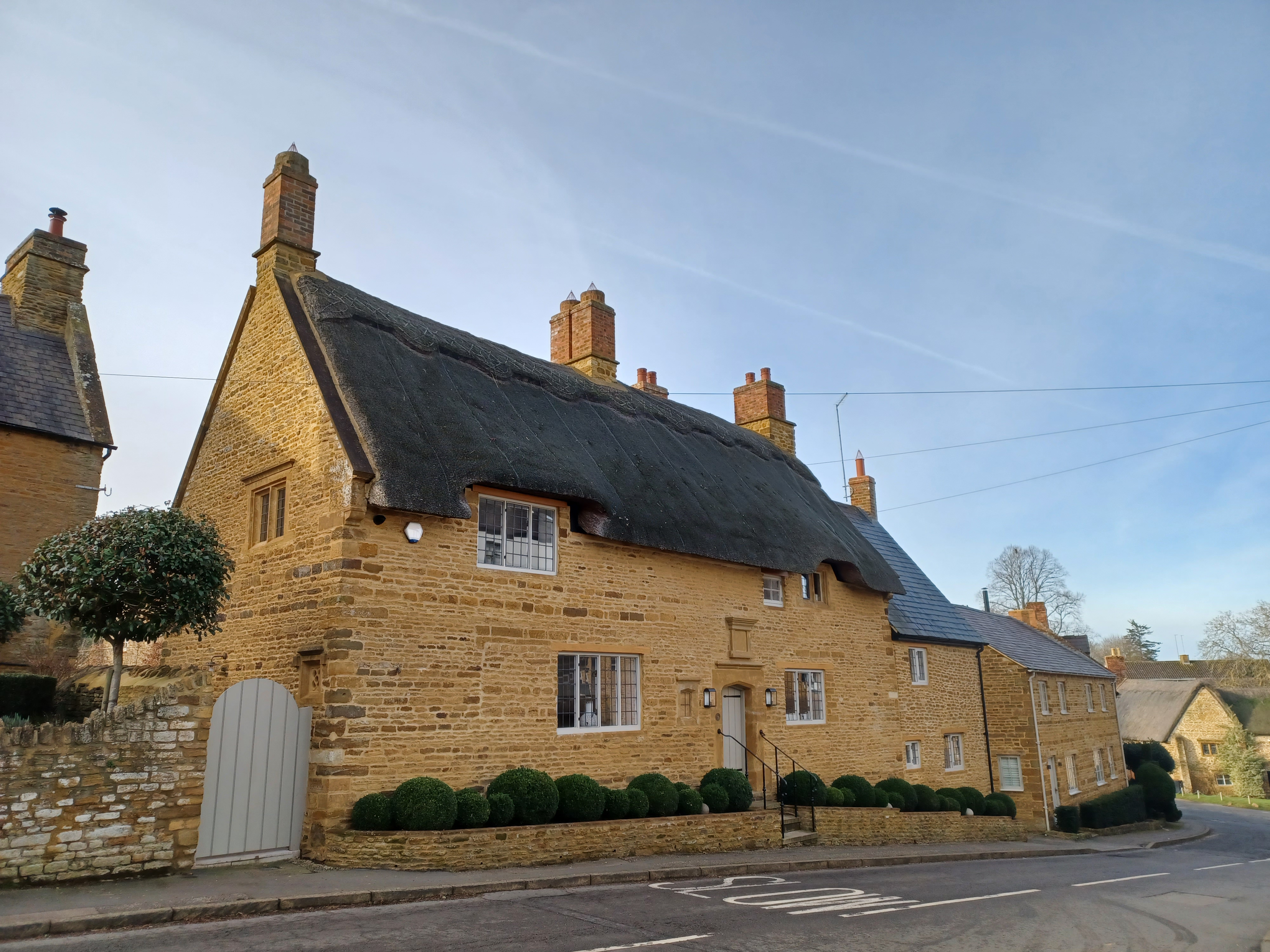
Merewater is one of the oldest buildings in Boughton

=== Boughton Hall, park and follies ===
A manor has been recorded in Boughton since at least the Norman period. The de Boughton family held the manor under Edward I, which passed through to Sir John Briscoe and Lord Ashburnham in the late 17th century. References to the latter manor stipulate that it was situated near the current Boughton Hall.

In the 1720s, the Hall was described as 'pleasantly situated upon rising ground which commands a very extensive prospect'. However, by 1808, the Hall lay deserted and ruined. In 1844, it was demolished and rebuilt by Gen. R. W. H. Howard-Vyse to the west of the old site in a Victorian style. Recently, the Hall was subdivided into two units and the associated stables and coach houses act as private dwellings.

The gardens to the south west of the Hall are surrounded by a large stone retaining wall that dates from the early 18th century. These formal gardens are presumed to have been laid out in their current form by Sir John Briscoe in the 1690s and form the oldest surviving element of the Hall and Park.

The parkland, which lies mainly to the north of the village, but previously stretched eastwards also, was largely redesigned in the 18th century by William Wentworth, 2nd Earl of Strafford (1722–1791), a friend of Horace Walpole.

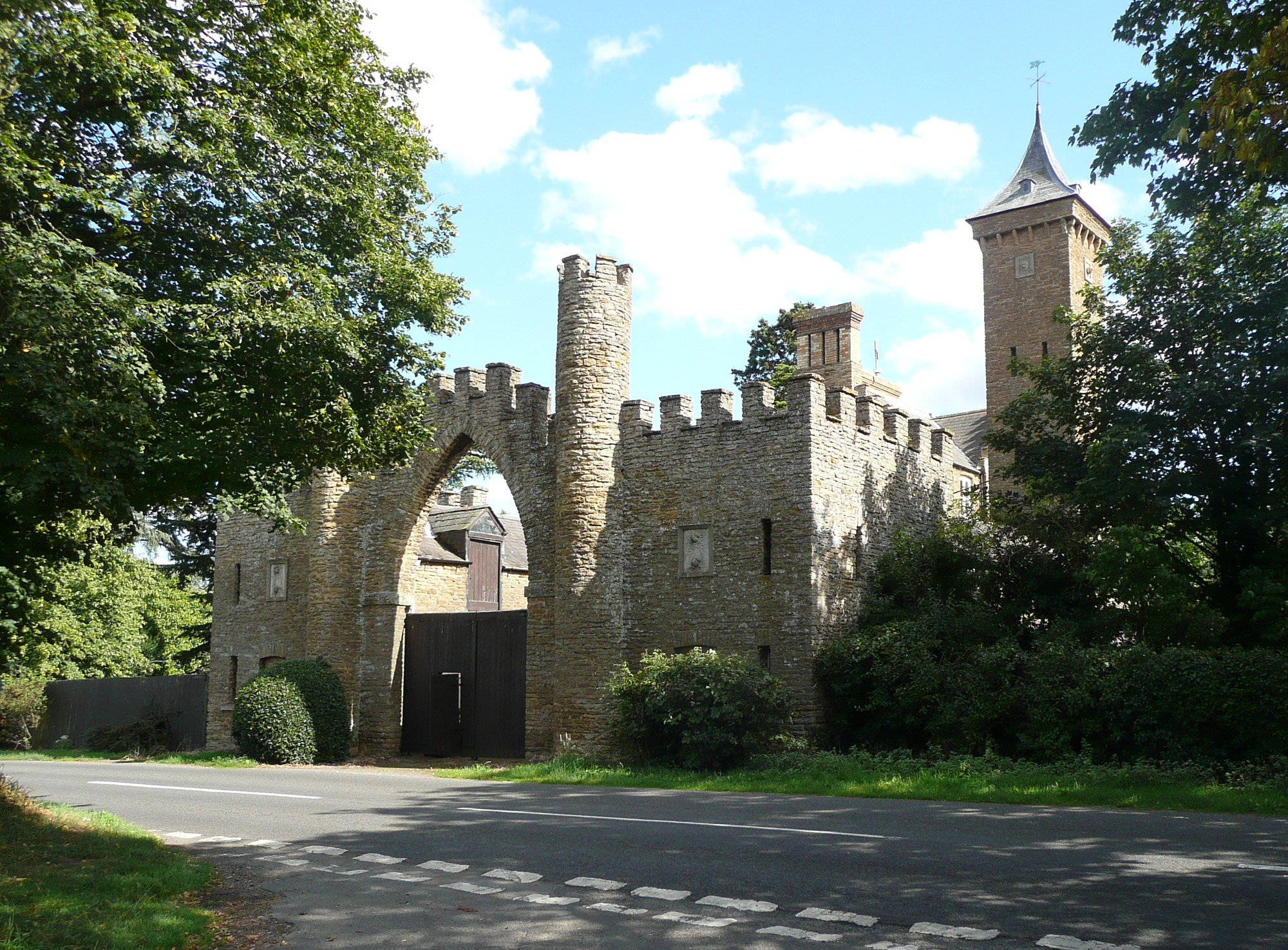
One of the Boughton Follies

Wentworth also installed a collection of follies which still stand, including The Spectacles (twin towers with a Gothic arch), Bunkers Hill Farm (1776), New Park Barn (1770) which resembles a fortified castle (now called Fox Covert Hall and converted into a house) and the castellated Hawking Tower (1756 or earlier), the main gate lodge on east side of the A508 main road. There is also a grotto north of the house and an obelisk to the south (1764) near Obelisk Rise, a large 1960s housing estate in Kingsthorpe.

Boughton Park contains Northamptonshire's largest collection of 18th century follies and other landscape structures. However, the Park's history was never properly documented until the publication of The Follies of Boughton Park by Simon Scott in 1995. A new edition, titled The Follies of Boughton Park Revisited was published in 2011, much expanded from the original. In 2022 a limited edition reprint of the 2011 book was published to mark the 300th anniversary of the birth of William Wentworth, Earl Strafford – the person responsible for the landscape and almost all the associated follies.

=== Modern ===
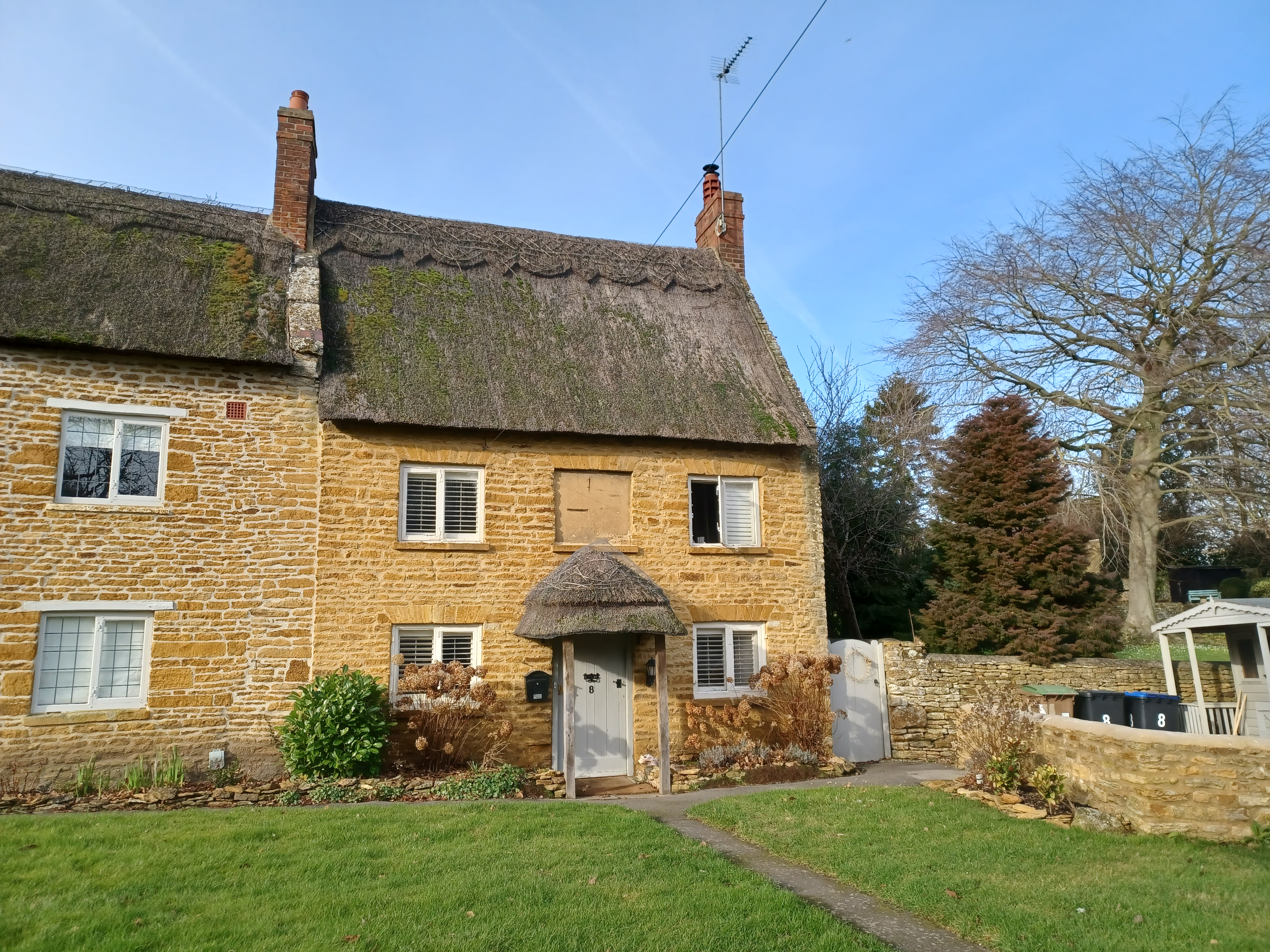
A cottage on Butchers Lane

During the 18th century, the village grew alongside the Hall. Surviving 18th century developments include the Rectory, Honeysuckle Cottage and Numbers 12, 13 and 14 Church Street.

In the 19th century, the Methodist Chapel on Moulton Lane was established as well as The Whyte Melville public house, which is named after the poet of the same name who once lived in the building. Two terraced rows of cottages were also erected on Moulton Lane and on Humfrey Lane. The earliest example is a surveyor's map of Northamptonshire in 1813, where Boughton's historic layout is clearly visible. Boughton Primary School opened in 1841.

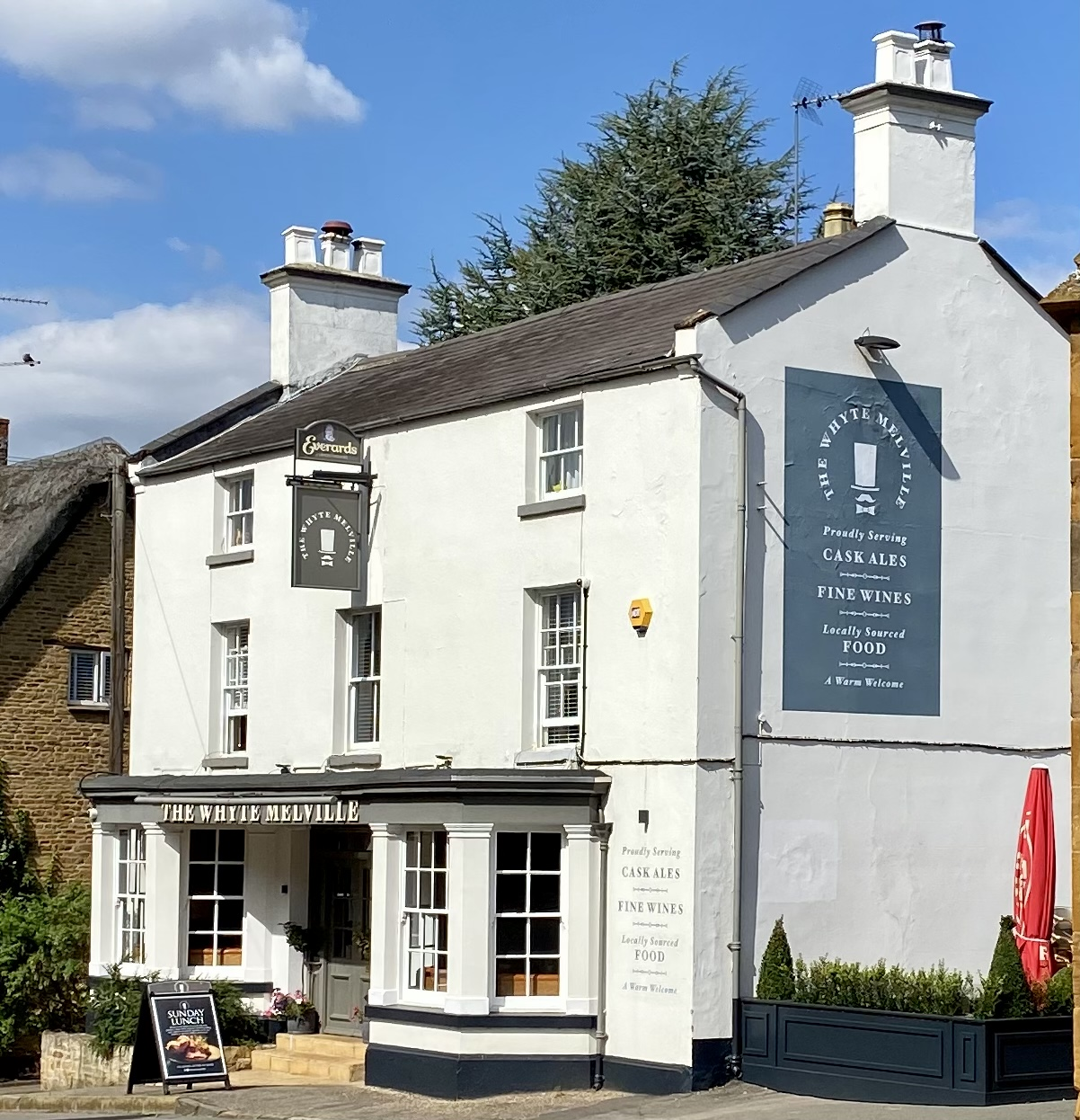
The Whyte Melville public house in the village

During the 20th century, more residential development took place. Most of these buildings are found on Butchers Lane; Spring Close, Moulton Lane, the southern side of Humfrey Lane, a 1960s housing estate along Howard Lane and a row of detached housing leading out of the village on Vyse Road.

== Demographics ==
The 2011 census indicated a population of 1,112, an increase from 951 in 2001. Historic figures: population in 1801 was 344; in 1831, 360; in 1841, 389; in 1851, 369; in 1861, 372; in 1871, 339.

== Governance ==
Boughton Parish Council has 11 members elected every 4 years. The local authority is West Northamptonshire Council, but prior to local government reform, was Daventry District Council and Northamptonshire County Council.

== Buckton Fields ==
In 2007, proposals were submitted to build a large housing development on Buckton Fields, land which sits within the Boughton parish to the south west of the village. An archaeological survey of the land in 2013 identified features associated with post-medieval agriculture, an early World War II searchlight battery and a mid 20th century rubbish pit.

After some revisions and public consultations to the original proposals, the planning application was approved by Daventry District Council in 2013 and work commenced on Phase 1 ("Buckton Fields East") in 2015 in a joint venture between Martin Grant Homes and Bloor Homes. By 2020, Phase 1 was mostly built out and occupied, closely followed by the start of Phase 2 ("Buckton Fields West") which was still in development as of 2024. Plans for Phase 3 were submitted by Taylor Wimpey in 2021 and work commenced in 2022.

Buckton Fields Primary School opened in September 2021. Like two other schools built from prefabricated modules by Caledonian Modular (Sir Frederick Gibberd College in Harlow and Haygrove School in Bridgwater), it was forced to close in August 2023 amid fears that the building might collapse in extreme weather. Education minister Nick Gibb said Department for Education (DfE) inspectors had "identified issues that related to the structural integrity of the buildings, weakening its ability for example to withstand extreme events such as high winds or a big snowfall or indeed a collision from a vehicle." The school had been designed by architects Stride Treglown but the DfE blamed poor workmanship, saying the school had not been built in accordance with the design. In December 2023, the DfE confirmed that the school would be demolished and rebuilt.
