= Bradlaugh Fields =

Nature reserve in the United Kingdom

Coordinates: 52.268°N 0.88°W

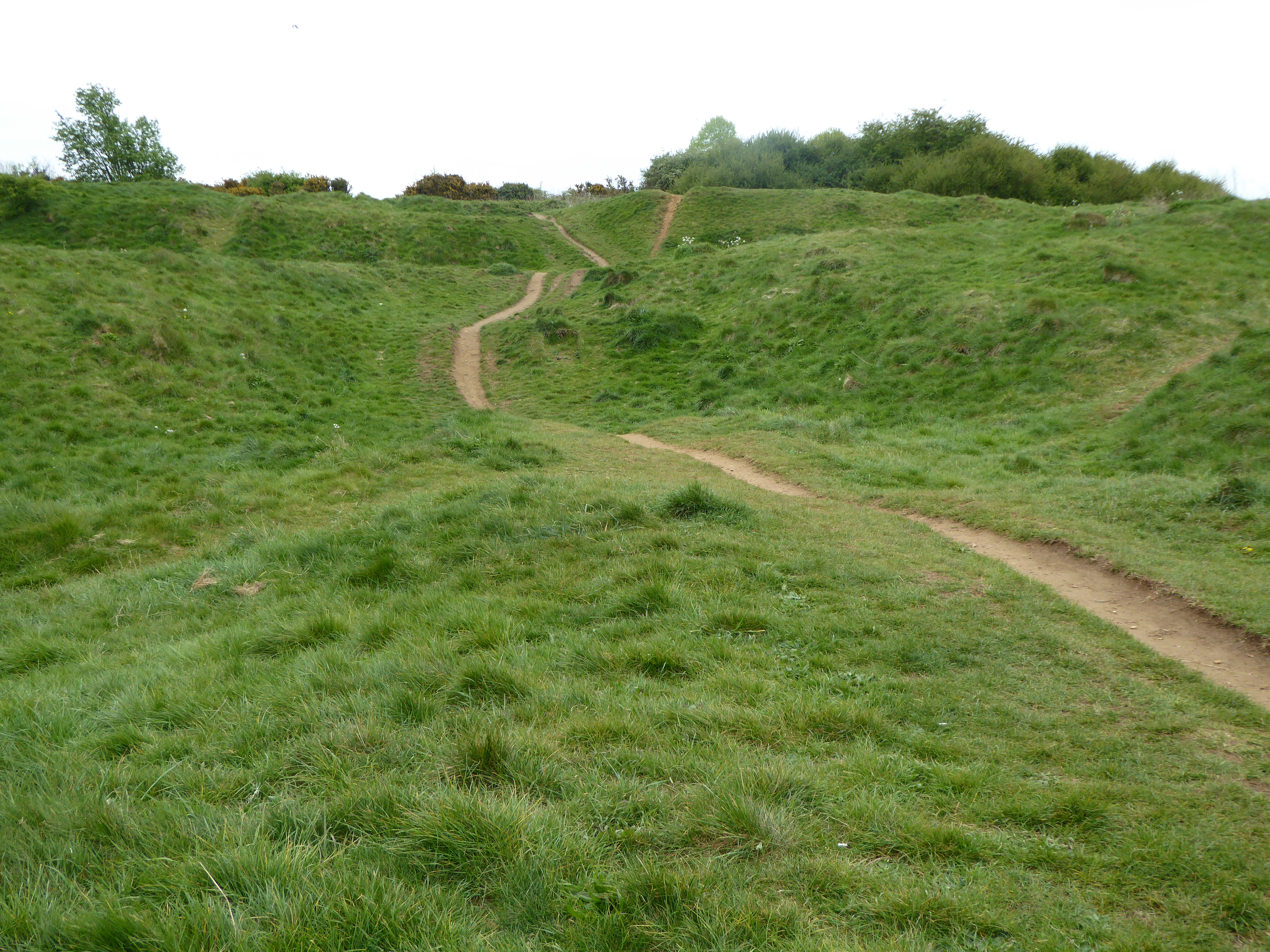
- Hills and Holes Local Nature Reserve
- Interactive map of Bradlaugh Fields
- Type: Nature reserve
- Location: Northampton
- OS grid: SP 765 639
- Area: 17.5 hectares (43 acres)
- Manager: Wildlife Trust for Bedfordshire, Cambridgeshire and Northamptonshire

Bradlaugh Fields is a 60-hectare (150-acre) open space in Northampton. The site is a former golf course. In 1987 it was proposed to build housing on the site, but after a campaign by local residents it was acquired by Northampton Borough Council and opened as a wildlife park in 1998. It was named after Charles Bradlaugh, a leading nineteenth century radical and atheist who was MP for Northampton. Three fields with a total area of 17.5 hectares are managed by the Wildlife Trust for Bedfordshire, Cambridgeshire and Northamptonshire as a nature reserve also called Bradlaugh Fields. Hills and Holes is at the southern end and two adjoining meadows, Scrub Field and Quarry Field, are at the northern end. Hills and Holes is an 8.3 hectare Local Nature Reserve (LNR) and Scrub Field is a 5.1-hectare (13-acre) LNR.

Bradlaugh Fields nature reserve has ancient hedgerows and unimproved grassland. Birds include blue tits, chiffchaffs, great spotted woodpeckers, sparrowhawks, redwings and fieldfares. Hill and Holes is an ancient disused quarry which has grassed ridges and hollows, some of them steeply sloping. There are a variety of habitats including limestone grassland. Scrub Field has a diverse selection of wild flowers, including Knautia arvensis and knapweed in higher areas, and bird's-foot trefoil and yellow rattle lower down.

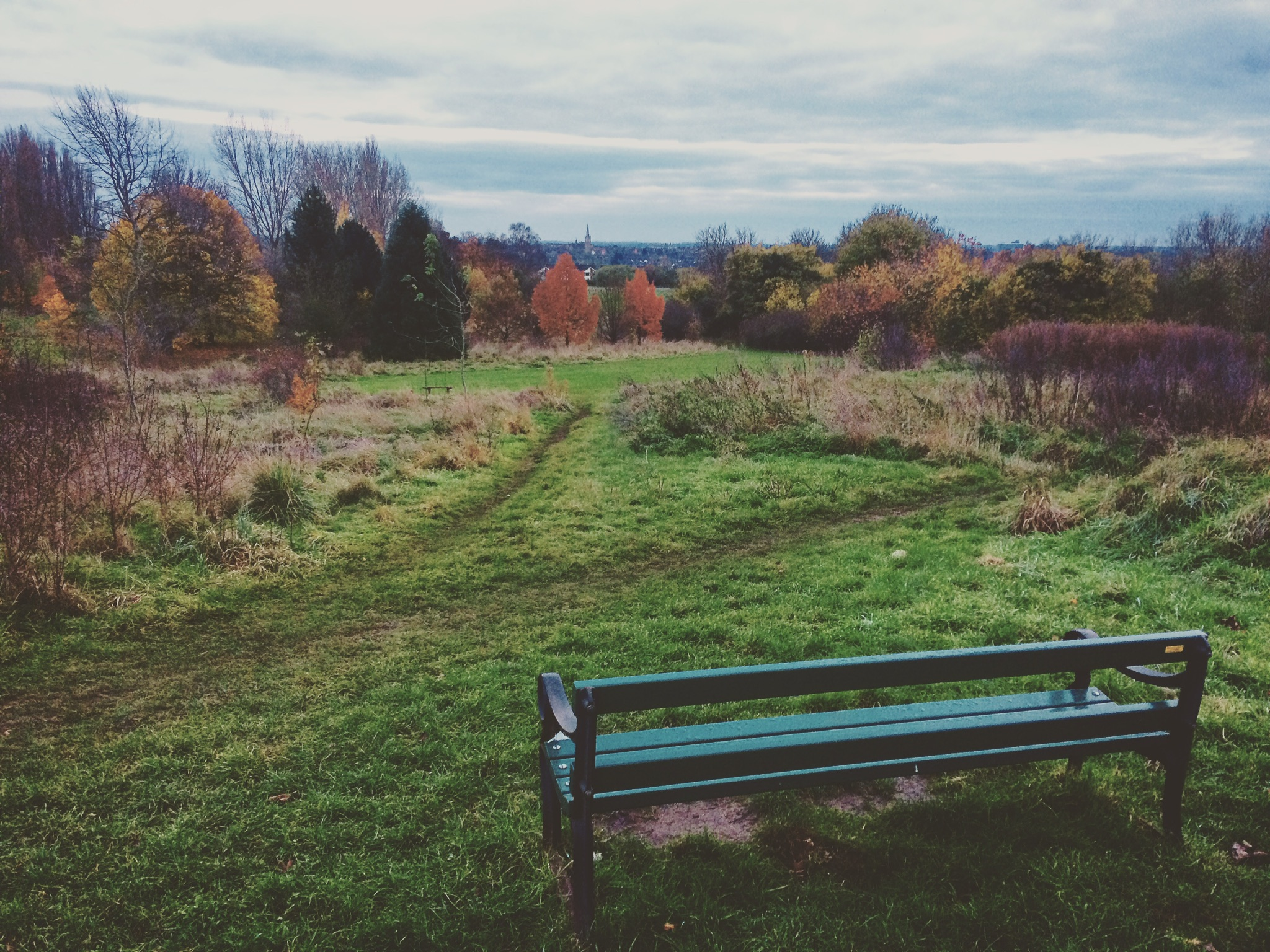
Views across the fields from the north

There is access to Hills and Holes from Kettering Road, and other access points include a footpath from Aintree Road which passes between Scrub Field and Quarry Field.
