= Crowfields Common =

Nature reserve in Northamptonshire, England

Coordinates: 52.286°N 0.848°W

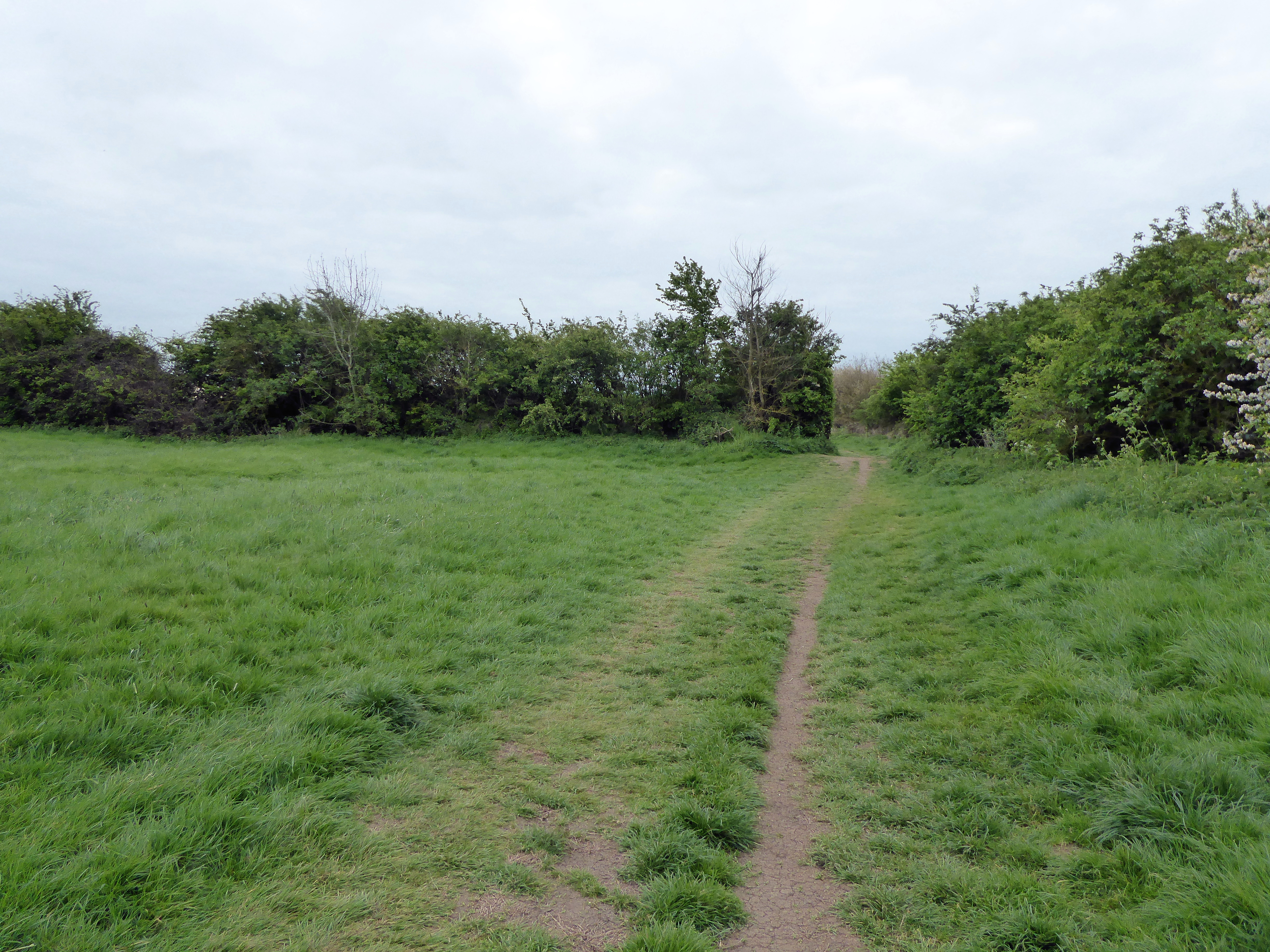
- Interactive map of Crowfields Common
- Type: Local Nature Reserve
- Location: Moulton, Northamptonshire
- OS grid: SP 787 659
- Area: 8.7 hectares (21 acres)
- Manager: Moulton Parish Council

Crowfields Common is an 8.7 hectare Local Nature Reserve in Moulton in Northamptonshire. It is owned and managed by Moulton Parish Council.

The site is grassland which has surviving medieval ridge and furrow. There are also mature trees and hedgerows, and a flower meadow.

There is access from Dove's Lane.
