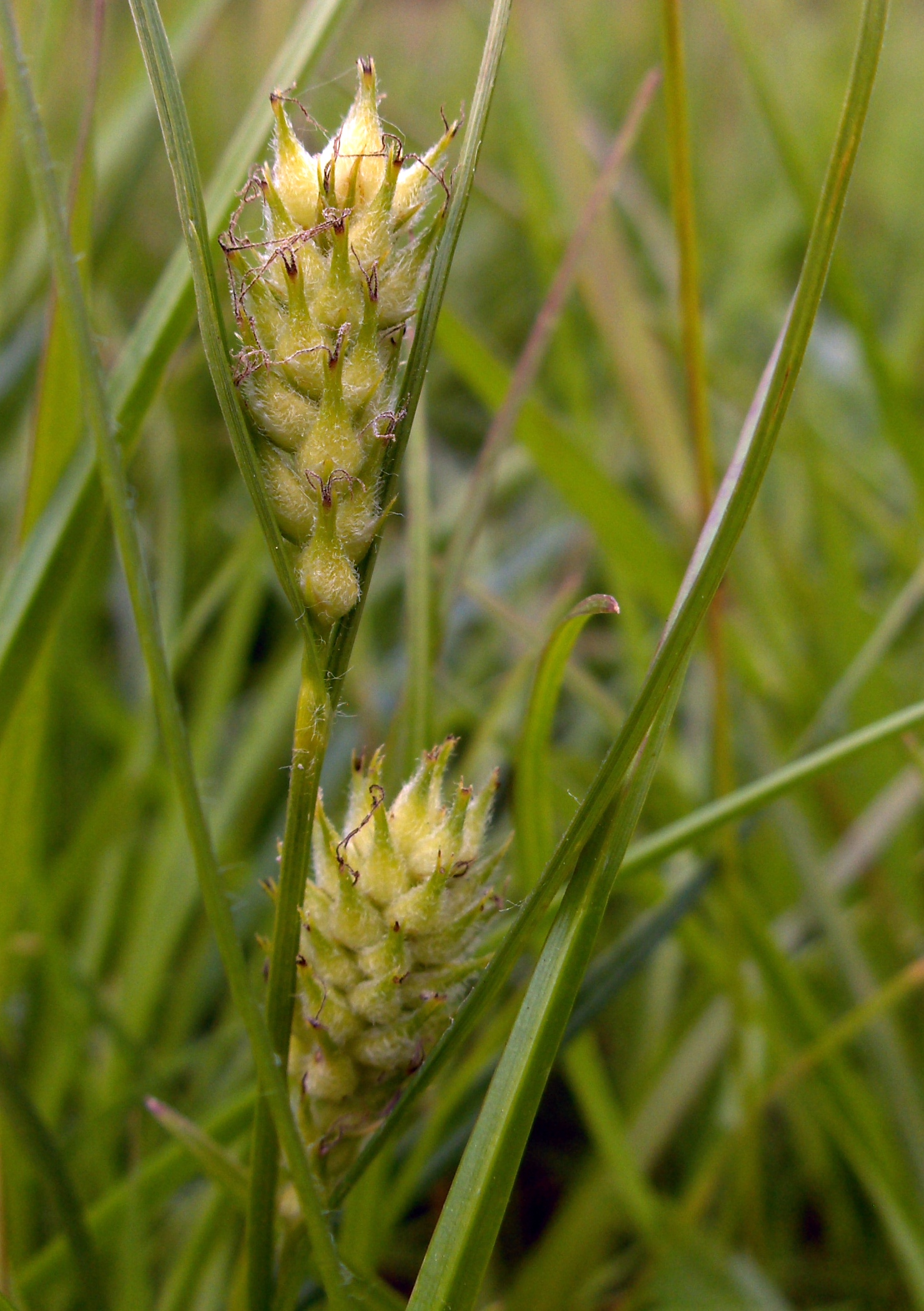
- Female spikes

Scientific classification
- Kingdom: Plantae
- Clade: Tracheophytes
- Clade: Angiosperms
- Clade: Monocots
- Clade: Commelinids
- Order: Poales
- Family: Cyperaceae
- Genus: Carex
- Subgenus: Carex subg. Carex
- Section: Carex sect. Carex
- Species: C. hirta

Binomial name
- Carex hirta L.

= Carex hirta =

Species of grass-like plant

Carex hirta, the hairy sedge or hammer sedge, is a species of sedge native across Europe. It has characteristic hairy leaves and inflorescences, and is the type species of the genus Carex.

== Description ==
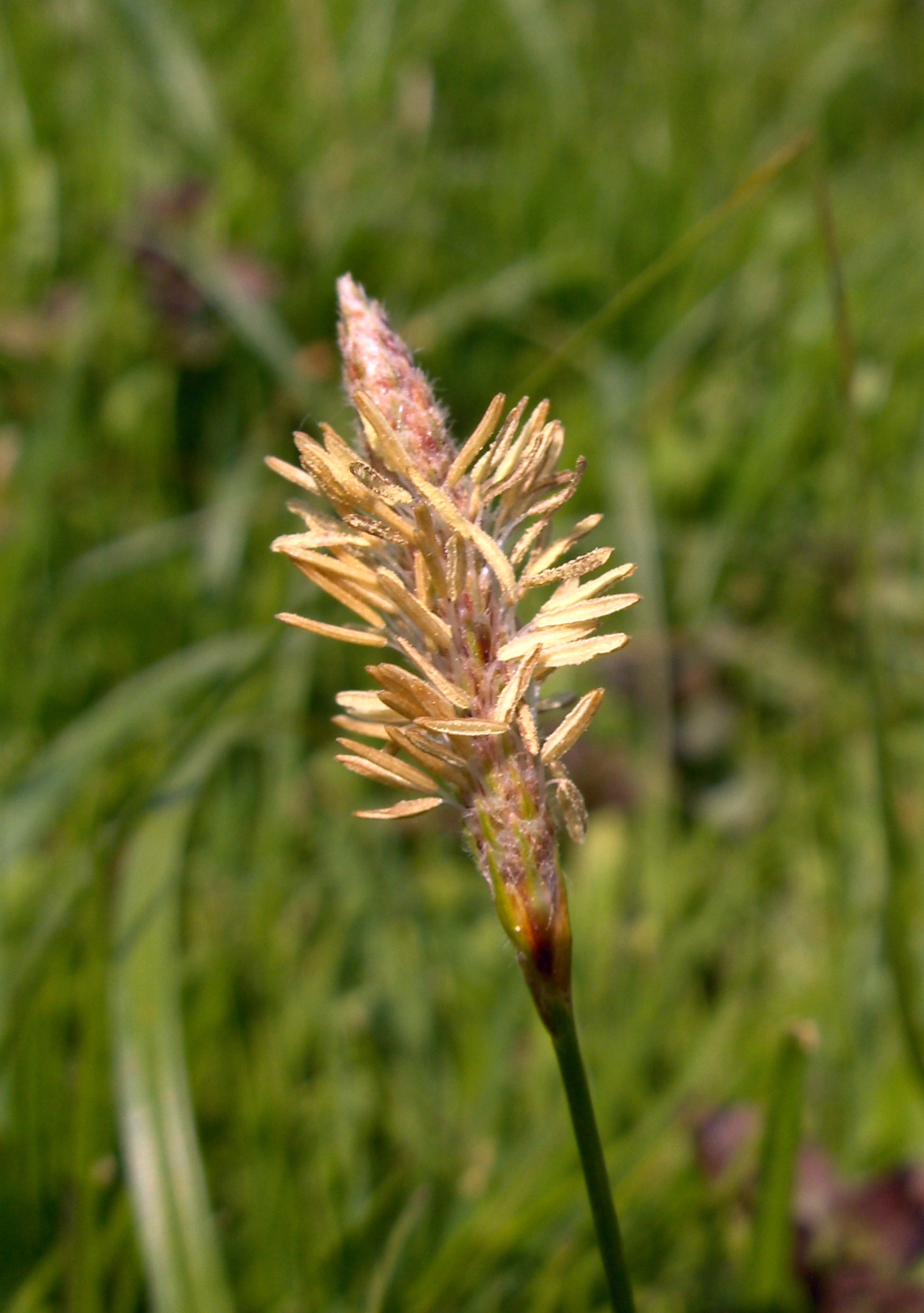
Terminal male spike

Carex hirta grows 15–70 centimetres (6–28 in) tall, with leaves 10–50 cm (4–20 in) long and 2–5 mm (0.08–0.20 in) (occasionally up to 8 mm or 0.3 in) wide. The stems are trigonous (roughly triangular in cross-section), but with convex, rounded faces. The leaves, leaf sheaths and ligules are all hairy, although plants growing in wetter positions may be less hairy; these have sometimes been separated as C. hirta var. sublaevis by Jens Wilken Hornemann, but this may not be a worthwhile taxon. The culms bear 2–3 lateral female spikes, each 10–45 mm (0.4–1.8 in) long, and on half-ensheathed peduncles up to twice the length of the spike. There are 2–3 male spikes at the end of the culm, each 10–30 mm (0.4–1.2 in) long. The hairy utricles, male glumes and leaves make it hard to confuse Carex hirta with any other Carex species.

== Distribution ==
Carex hirta is native to Europe, and is found across the British Isles, albeit with records becoming very scarce in the far north. It has been introduced to North America. It was first recorded in Amherst, Massachusetts in 1877, and has since been found across much of the eastern United States and Canada.

== Nomenclature ==
Carex hirta is the type species of the genus Carex, and therefore also of the subgenus Carex and the section Carex. It was described by Carl Linnaeus in his 1753 Species Plantarum, and the lectotype, from the herbarium of Adriaan van Royen, was designated by Ilkka Kukkonen in 1992.
