= Birds Directive =

European environmental law

The Birds Directive (formally known as Council Directive 2009/147/EC on the conservation of wild birds) is the oldest piece of European Union legislation on the environment and one of its cornerstones. It was unanimously adopted in April 1979 as Directive 79/409/EEC, which was amended in 2009, when Directive 2009/147/EC took its place. There had been a number of amendments during the intervening years: Directive 2009/147/EC was issued in order to codify and rationalise the EU's conservation requirements in the light of the various amendments. The Directives aim to protect all European wild birds and the habitats of listed species, in particular through the designation of Special Protection Areas (often known by the acronym SPA).

The Birds Directive is one of the EU's two directives in relation to wildlife and nature conservation, the other being the Habitats Directive. The Habitats Directive led to the setting up of a network of Special Areas of Conservation, which together with the existing Special Protection Areas form a network of protected sites across the European Union called Natura 2000. In the UK the Directive is implemented by the Wildlife and Countryside Act 1981.

== See also ==
- Conservation movement
- List of European Union directives
- EU law

== Sources ==
- Jan-Henrik Meyer: 2010. Saving Migrants: a Transnational Network supporting Supranational Bird Protection Policy in the 1970's. In Transnational Networks in Regional Integration. Informal Governance in Europe 1945–83, edited by W. Kaiser, M. Gehler and B. Leucht. Basingstoke. Palgrave, 176–198. ISBN 978-0-230-24169-5, ISBN 0-230-24169-7.
- Jan-Henrik Meyer: Zivilgesellschaftliche Mobilisierung und die frühe europäische Umweltpolitik. Die Vogelschutzrichtlinie der Europäischen Gemeinschaften von 1979. In Themenportal Europäische Geschichte (2013).
