= Westergaard =

Westergaard [ˈvestɐˌkɒˀ] is a Danish surname, literally meaning west farm. Note that the double a is equivalent of å in common nouns and is retained from the pre-1948 orthography in proper nouns only. The form Vestergaard is a more common cognate. Notable people with the surname Westergaard include:

- Bjørn Westergaard (born 1962), Danish Olympic sailor
- Elof Westergaard (born 1962), Danish Lutheran bishop
- Harald Ludvig Westergaard (1853–1936), Danish statistician and economist
- Harold M. Westergaard (1888–1950), Danish professor of theoretical and applied mechanics
- John Westergaard (1931–2003), American stock analyst
- Kurt Westergaard (1935–2021), Danish cartoonist
- Marit Westergaard (born 1956), Norwegian linguist and language acquisitionist
- Mogens Westergaard (1912–1975), Danish geneticist and cytogeneticist
- Niels Ludvig Westergaard (1815–1878), Danish orientalist
- Peter Westergaard (1931–2019), American composer and music theorist

== See also ==
- Vestergaard
