= Sennholz =

Sennholz is a surname. Notable people with the surname include:

- Gustav Sennholz (1850−1895), German horticulturalist
- Hans Sennholz (1922–2007), German-American economist
