= Mogens Westergaard =

Danish biologist

- Born: June 12, 1912
- Died: August 6, 1975 (aged 63)
- Known for: Research on sex determination in plants and cytological mechanisms of meiosis
- Scientific career
- Fields: Genetics, cytogenetics
- Institutions: University of Copenhagen; Carlsberg Laboratory
- Doctoral advisor: Øjvind Winge

Mogens Christian Wanning Westergaard (12 June 1912 – 6 August 1975) was a Danish geneticist and cytogeneticist known for pioneering studies of sex determination in plants, mutagenesis in fungi, and the cytological mechanisms of meiosis. His research on the dioecious plant Melandrium album helped establish that the presence of a Y chromosome determines male sex in the species.

== Early life and career ==
Westergaard was born in Denmark on 12 June 1912. He studied biology and genetics at the University of Copenhagen, where he became a student of the prominent Danish geneticist Øjvind Winge at the Carlsberg Laboratory.

Early in his career Westergaard developed an interest in cytogenetics and the genetic mechanisms underlying sex determination in plants.

Westergaard belonged to a prominent intellectual lineage in genetics. In a genealogical analysis of the field by Alfred Henry Sturtevant, Westergaard's scientific ancestry was traced through Øjvind Winge to the Danish geneticist Wilhelm Johannsen, one of the founders of modern genetics.

Westergaard served as the first professor of genetics at the University of Copenhagen and he played a central role in developing the university’s Genetics Institute as a major center for genetics research in Denmark.

== Research ==
=== Sex determination in plants ===
Westergaard’s early research focused on the genetic basis of sex determination in dioecious plants, particularly Melandrium album (now Silene latifolia).

At the time he began this work, many geneticists believed that plant sex determination operated through a balance between X chromosomes and autosomes, similar to the mechanism described in Drosophila. Through cytogenetic studies of polyploid and aneuploid plants, Westergaard demonstrated that male sex in Melandrium is determined by the presence of a Y chromosome rather than solely by the ratio of X chromosomes to autosomes. His experiments showed that several X chromosomes are required to counterbalance the male-determining genes carried on a single Y chromosome.

Using plants carrying fragmented or partially deleted Y chromosomes, Westergaard identified different functional regions of the Y chromosome responsible for suppressing female development and initiating male reproductive structures. These experiments demonstrated that the Y chromosome carries multiple linked factors involved in sex determination and male fertility.

Based on his experimental findings and comparisons across plant species, Westergaard proposed that the evolution of separate sexes in flowering plants involves at least two closely linked genetic factors: one suppressing female development and another promoting male function. This model helped explain the origin of plant sex chromosomes and predicted the evolution of suppressed recombination between X and Y chromosomes.

Related studies in Silene demonstrated that the Y chromosome carries a strong male-determining factor capable of directing male development even in individuals with multiple X chromosomes. This discovery in plants preceded the identification of a male-determining factor on the human Y chromosome by several decades. These studies helped establish Melandrium/Silene as a major model for the genetic and evolutionary study of plant sex chromosomes.

=== Fungal genetics and mutation research ===
Following the Second World War, Westergaard spent time at the California Institute of Technology working with Herschel K. Mitchell studying fungal genetics. Westergaard and Mitchell developed a culture medium that facilitated the formation of perithecia in Neurospora crassa, which enabled improved genetic analysis of this model organism.

Westergaard also pioneered the use of back-mutation assays to study the mutagenic effects of chemical and physical agents in fungi. Work by Westergaard and collaborators using adenine-requiring mutants of Neurospora became an important experimental system for investigating mutagenesis in eukaryotes.

=== Studies of meiosis and chromosome structure ===
Later in his career, Westergaard's work on Neurospora included cytological investigations of meiotic chromosome structure and the synaptonemal complex.

Working with the fungus Neottiella rutilans and later with lily (Lilium), Westergaard and collaborators, including Diter von Wettstein, examined the organization of meiotic chromosomes and the timing of recombination events. In his later years, he continued studying meiotic chromosome behavior in Lilium, investigating chromosome pairing and crossing-over.

These studies connected chromosome pairing and crossing-over and provided evidence that DNA replication occurs before karyogamy in ascomycete fungi. His cytological work helped demonstrate how microscopic analysis of chromosomes could characterize genetic processes.

== Second World War and resistance activities ==
During the Second World War he participated in the Danish resistance movement and was imprisoned by German authorities. In 1951, he became the subject of international attention when the United States denied him entry to attend a genetics conference because of a previous Communist Party affiliation. During the German occupation of Denmark in World War II, Westergaard joined the Danish resistance movement.

According to records from the Danish Resistance Database, he participated in underground resistance activities and was arrested by German authorities in 1944, spending time in the Frøslev internment camp.

== Selected publications ==
- Westergaard, M. (1946). "Aberrant Y chromosomes and sex expression in Melandrium album." Hereditas. 32 (3–4): 419–443. doi:10.1111/j.1601-5223.1946.tb02784.x. PMID 20998142.
- Westergaard, M.; Mitchell, H. K. (1947). "Neurospora V. A synthetic medium favoring sexual reproduction." American Journal of Botany. 34: 573–577. doi:10.1002/j.1537-2197.1947.tb13032.x.
- Westergaard, M. (1958). "The mechanism of sex determination in dioecious flowering plants." Advances in Genetics. 9: 217–281. doi:10.1016/S0065-2660(08)60163-7.
- Jensen, K.; Kirk, I.; Kølmark, G.; Westergaard, M. (1951). "Chemically induced mutations in Neurospora." Cold Spring Harbor Symposia on Quantitative Biology. 16: 245–261. doi:10.1101/SQB.1951.016.01.020.
