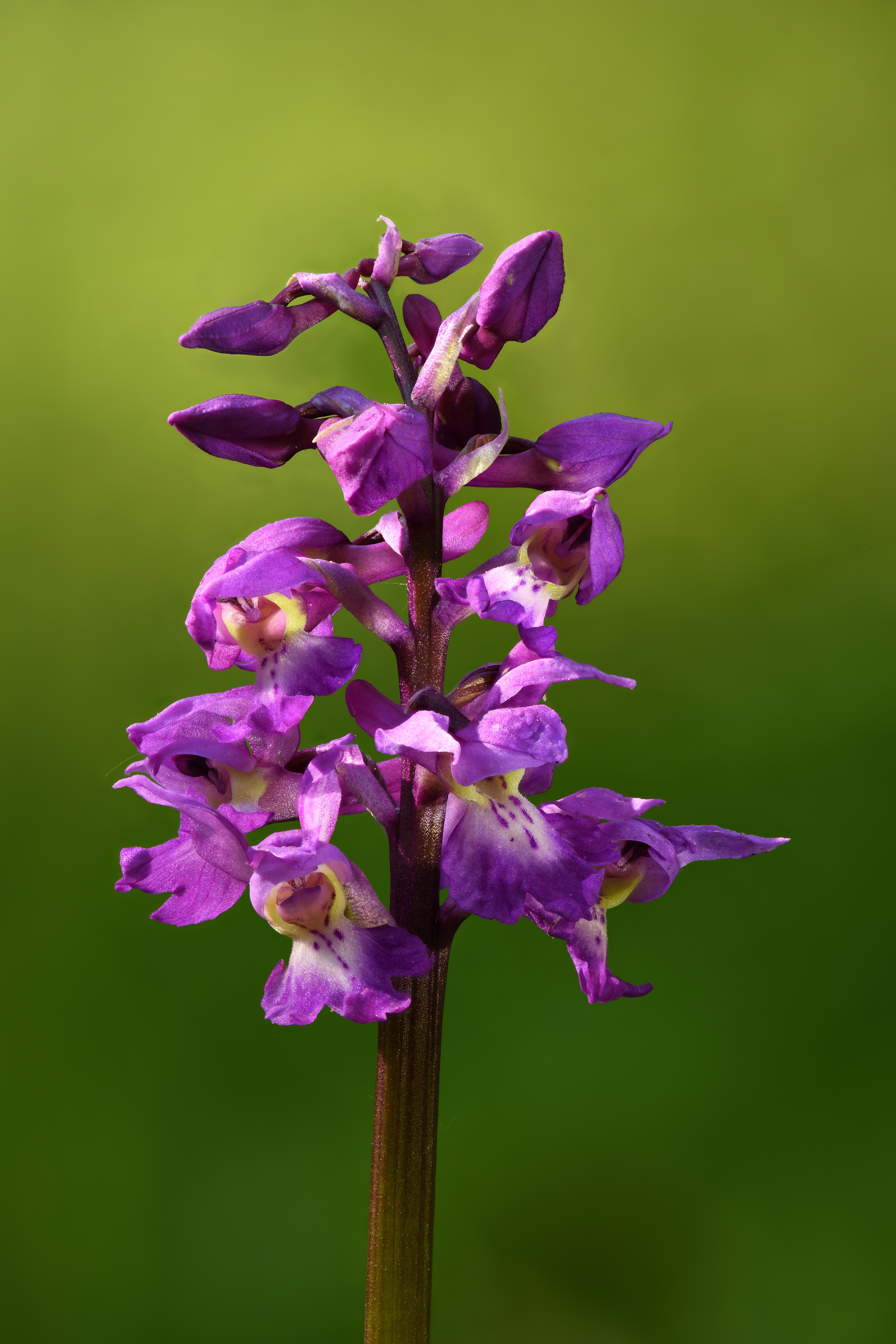
- Inflorescence

Scientific classification
- Kingdom: Plantae
- Clade: Tracheophytes
- Clade: Angiosperms
- Clade: Monocots
- Order: Asparagales
- Family: Orchidaceae
- Subfamily: Orchidoideae
- Genus: Orchis
- Species: O. mascula

Binomial name
- Orchis mascula (L.) L.

= Orchis mascula =

Species of flowering plant in the orchid family

Orchis mascula, the early-purple orchid, early spring orchis, is a species of flowering plant in the orchid family, Orchidaceae.

== Description ==
Orchis mascula is a perennial herbaceous plant with stems up to 50–60 centimetres (20–24 in) high, green at the base and purple on the apex. The root system consists of two tubers, rounded or ellipsoid. The leaves, grouped at the base of the stem, are oblong-lanceolate, pale green, sometimes with brownish-purple speckles. The inflorescence is 7.5–12.5 centimetres (3–5 in) long and it is composed of 6 to 20 flowers gathered in dense cylindrical spikes. The flower size is about 2.5 centimetres (1 in) and the color varies from pinkish-purple to purple. The lateral sepals are ovate-lanceolate and erect, the median one, together with the petals, is smaller and cover the gynostegium. The labellum is three-lobed and convex, with crenulated margins and the basal part clearer and dotted with purple-brown spots. The spur is cylindrical or clavate, horizontal or ascending. The gynostegium is short, with reddish-green anthers. It blooms from April to June.

Morphology

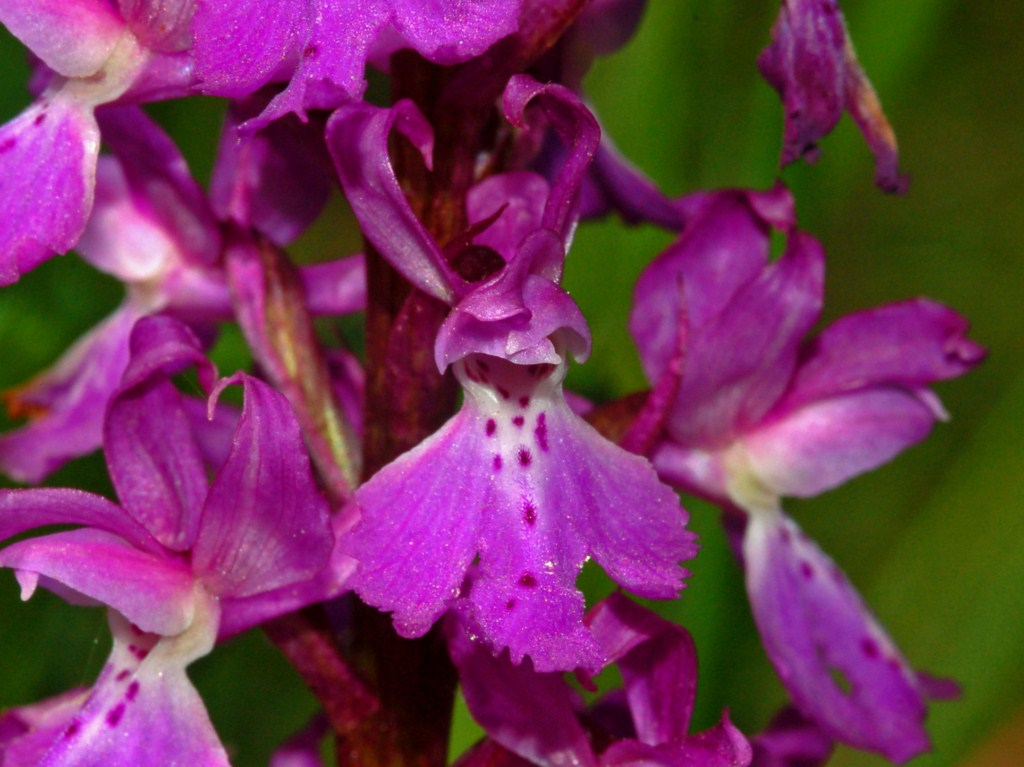
Close-up of a flower

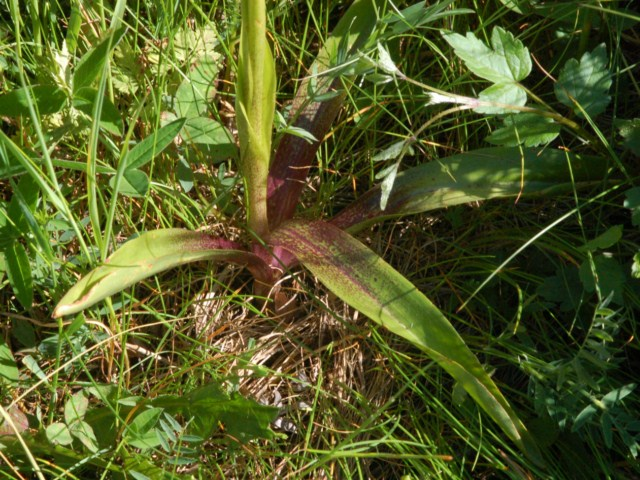
Foliage

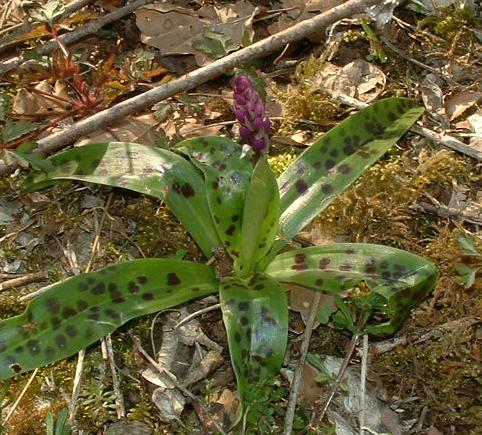
Distinctive spotted foliage in some specimens

== Ecology ==
This orchid is devoid of nectar and attracts pollinating insects (bees and wasps of the genera Apis, Bombus, Eucera, Andrena, Psithyrus and Xylocopa, and sometimes beetles) with the appearance of its flower which mimics other species.

Orchids in the genus Orchis form mycorrhizal partnerships mainly with fungi in the family Tulasnellaceae. Orchis mascula has been suggested to have only one mycorrhizal partner, in the Tulasnellaceae.

== Distribution and habitat ==
The species is widespread across Europe, from Portugal to the Caucasus (Ireland, Great Britain, The Faroe Islands, Norway, Sweden, Finland, Latvia, Spain, France, Belgium, Netherlands, Germany, Denmark, Austria, Hungary, the Czech Republic, Switzerland, Italy, former Yugoslavia, Albania, Greece, Turkey, Bulgaria, Romania, Poland, Ukraine, most of Russia), in northwest Africa (Algeria, Tunisia, Morocco) and in the Middle East (Lebanon, Syria, Iraq) up to Iran. (Codes)

It grows in a variety of habitats, from meadows to mountain pastures and woods, in full sun or shady areas, from sea level to 2,500 metres (8,000 ft) altitude.

== Taxonomy ==
The Latin specific epithet mascula means "male" or "virile"; this could refer to the robust aspect of this species, or to the shape of the two tubers, which resemble testicles.

=== Subspecies ===
As of June 2014, the World Checklist of Selected Plant Families recognizes five subspecies:

- Orchis mascula subsp. ichnusae Corrias
- Orchis mascula subsp. laxifloriformis Rivas Goday & B.Rodr. (including O. langei, O. mascula subsp. hispanica)
- Orchis mascula subsp. mascula (including O. mascula subsp. pinetorum)
- Orchis mascula subsp. scopulorum (Summerh.) H.Sund. ex H.Kretzschmar, Eccarius & H.Dietr.
- Orchis mascula subsp. speciosa (Mutel) Hegi
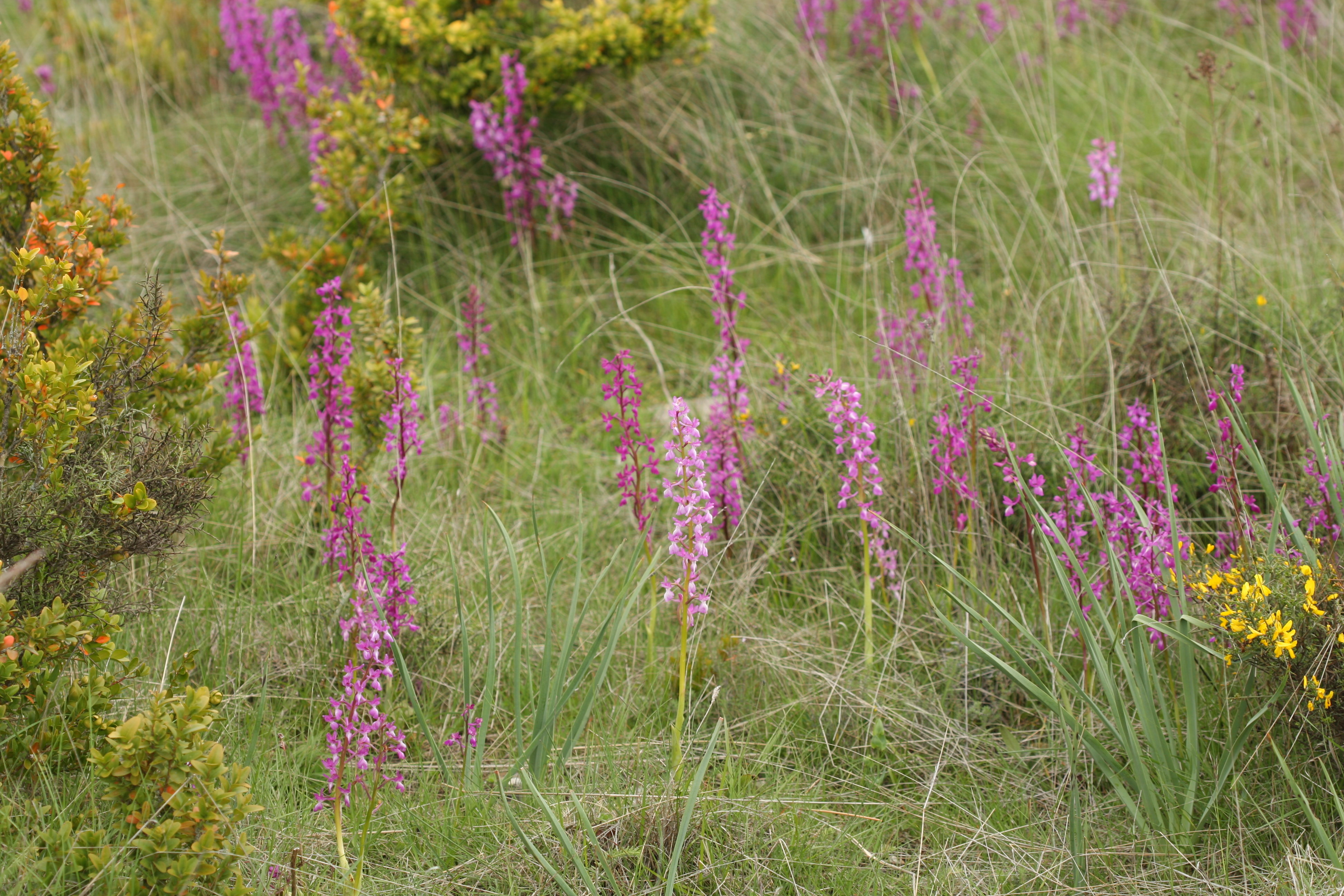
Orchis mascula subsp. laxifloriformis - Spain, Navarre

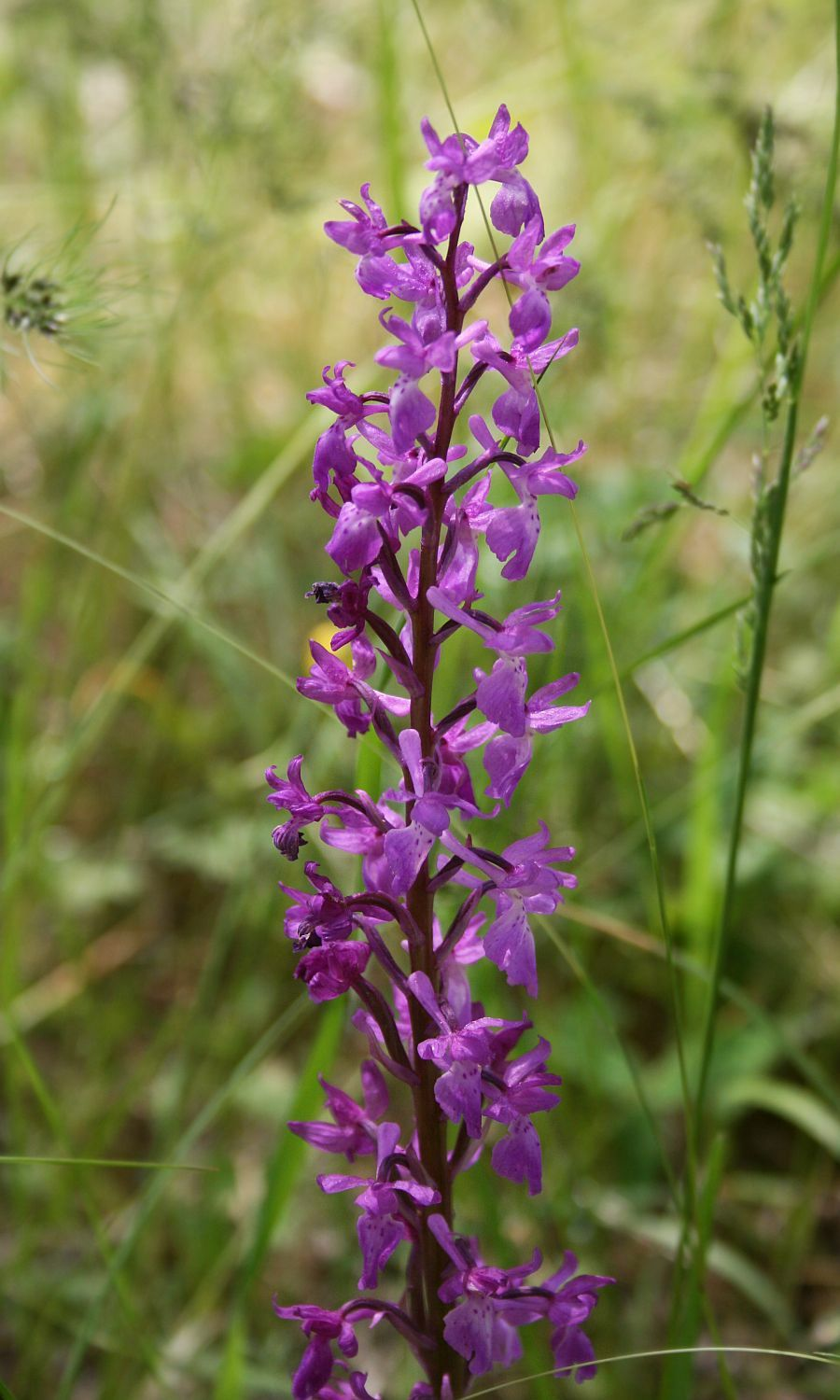
Orchis mascula subsp. mascula

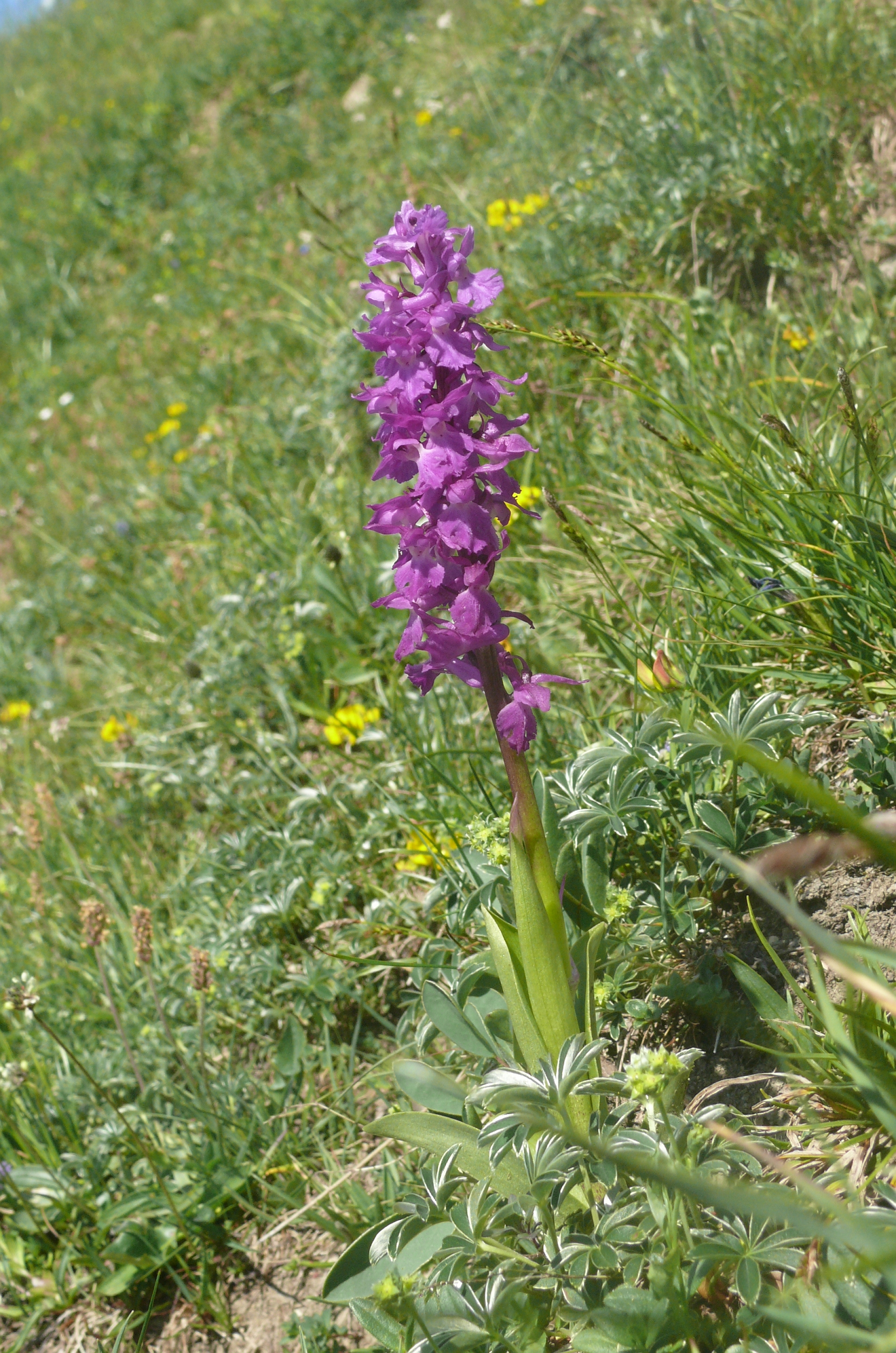
Orchis mascula subsp. speciosa – Germany, Allgäuer Alpen

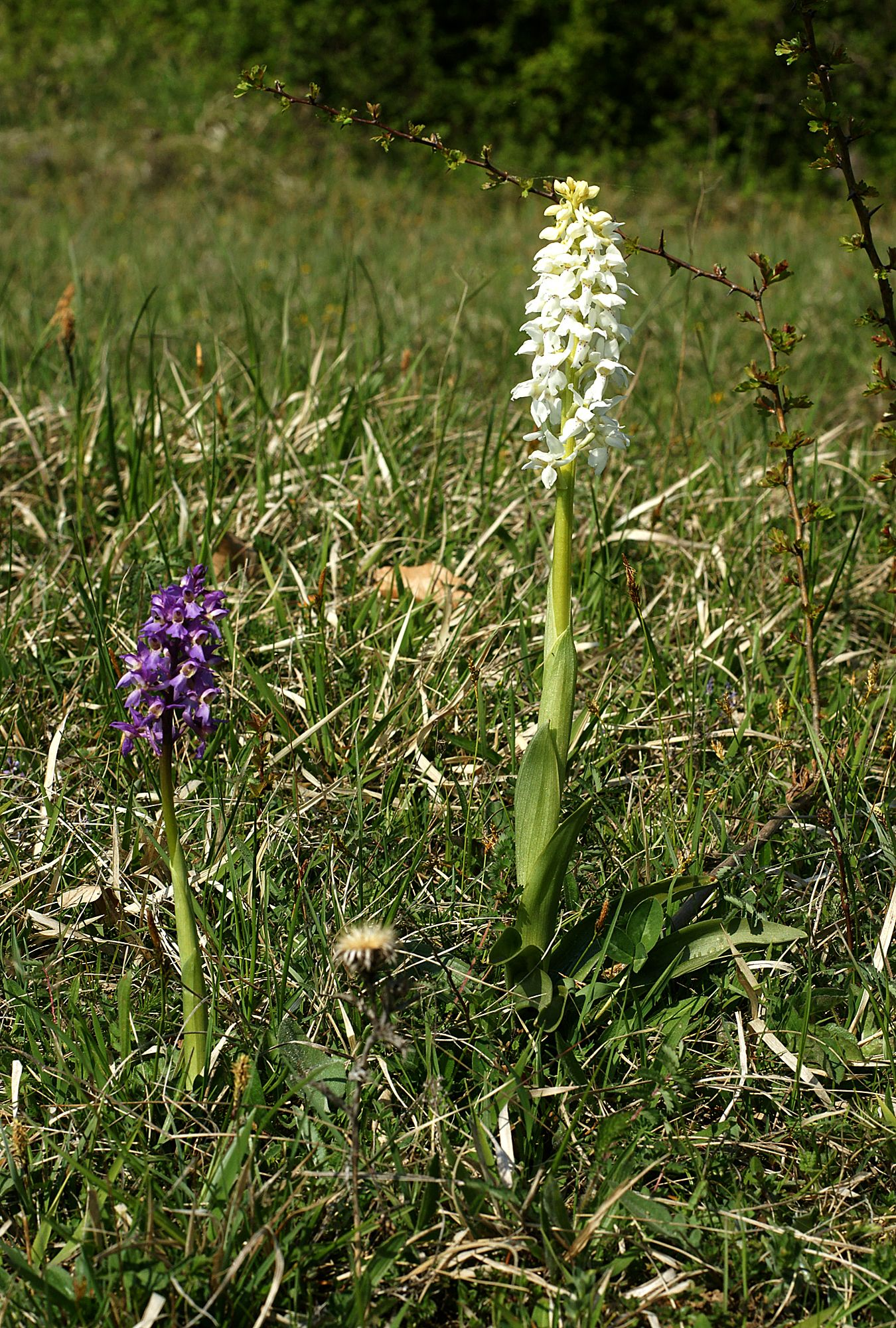
Orchis mascula (white form) – Germany, Saarland

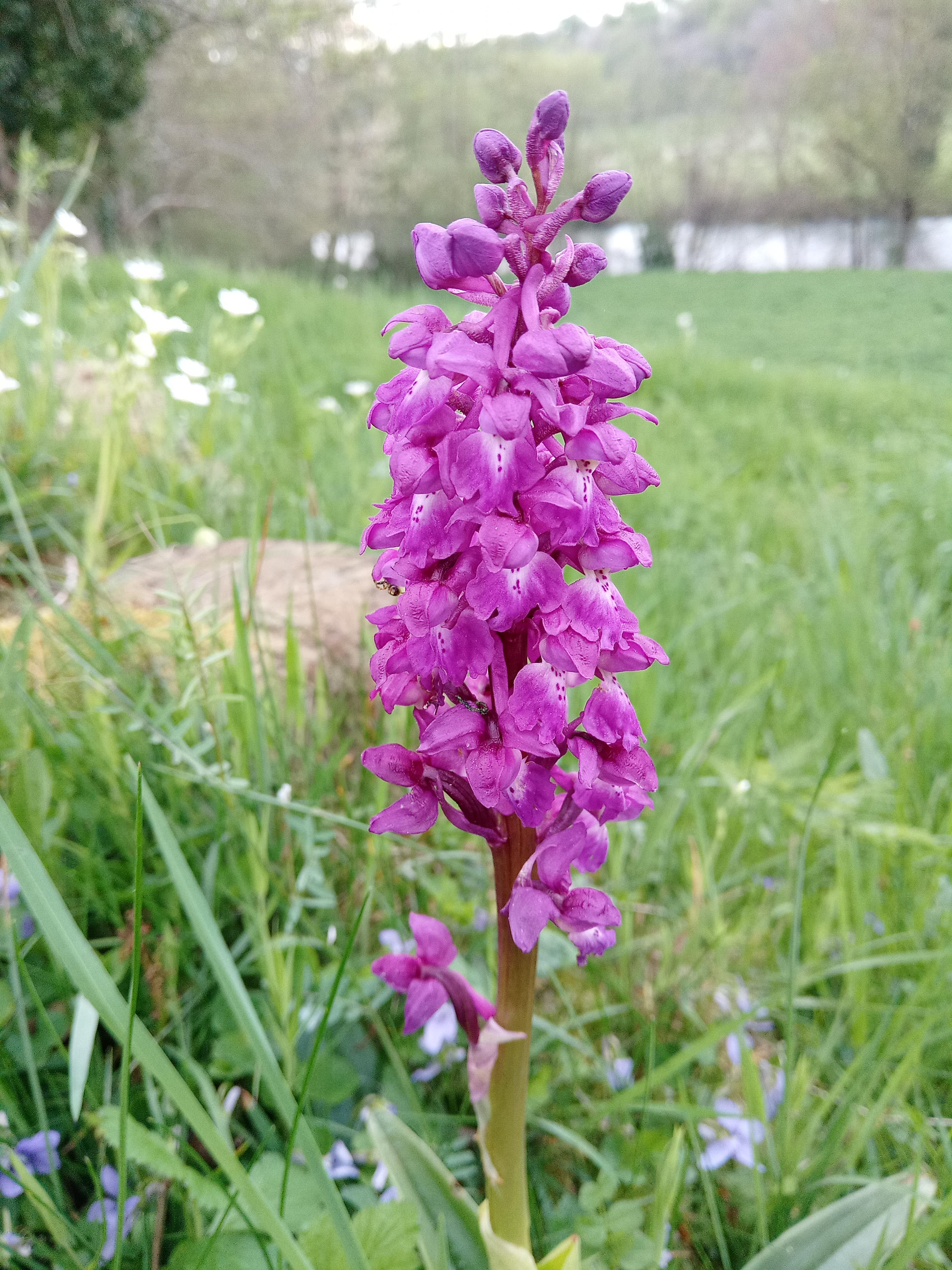
Orchis mascula France, Pyrénées

=== Synonyms ===
- Orchidactyla kromayeri (M.Schulze) Borsos & Soó 1966
- Orchidactyla pentecostalis (Wettst. & Sennholz) Borsos & Soó 1966
- Orchidactyla speciosissima (Wettst. & Sennholz) Borsos & Soó 1966
- Orchis brevicornis var. fallax De Not. 1844
- Orchis cochleata Fleischm. & M.Schulze 1902
- Orchis compressiflora Stokes 1812
- Orchis fallax (De Not.) Willk. in Willk. & J.M.C.Lange 1861
- Orchis glaucophylla A.Kern. 1864
- Orchis kromayeri M.Schulze 1904
- Orchis mascula f. longifolia Landwehr 1977
- Orchis mascula subsp. occidentalis O.Schwarz 1949
- Orchis mascula subsp. signifera (Vest) Soó 1927
- Orchis mascula subsp. tenera (Landwehr) Del Prete 1999
- Orchis mascula var. acutiflora W.D.J.Koch 1837
- Orchis mascula var. bicolor Balayer 1986
- Orchis mascula var. fallax E.G.Camus 1889
- Orchis mascula var. hostii Patze, E.Mey. & Elkan 1848
- Orchis mascula var. maritzii J.A.Guim. 1887
- Orchis mascula var. monsignatica Font Quer 1928
- Orchis mascula var. obtusiflora W.D.J.Koch 1837
- Orchis mascula var. speciosa Mutel 1836
- Orchis mascula var. tenera Landwehr 1977
- Orchis monsignatica (Font Quer) Rivas Goday 1941
- Orchis morio f. mascula L. 1753
- Orchis morio var. mascula L. 1753 (basionym)
- Orchis obtusa Schur 1866
- Orchis obtusiflora Schur 1853
- Orchis olivetorum Gren. ex Nyman 1882
- Orchis ovalis F.W.Schmidt 1791
- Orchis parreissii C.Presl 1845
- Orchis patens var. fallax (De Not.) Rchb.f. 1851
- Orchis pentecostalis Wettst. & Sennholz 1889
- Orchis signifera Vest 1824
- Orchis speciosa Host 1831
- Orchis speciosissima Wettst. & Sennholz 1889
- Orchis stabiana Tenore 1833
- Orchis tenera (Landwehr) Kreutz 1991
- Orchis untchji M.Schulze 1907
- Orchis vernalis Salisbury 1796
- Orchis wanjkovii E.Wulff 1930
- Orchis wilmsii K.Richt. 1890

== Cultivation and uses ==
A flour called salep or sachlav is made of the ground tubers of this or some other species of orchids. It contains a nutritious starch-like polysaccharide called glucomannan.

== Culture and symbolism ==
Orchis mascula is commonly thought to be the plant referred to as "long purples" in Shakespeare's Hamlet (Act 4, Scene 7):

Therewith fantastic garlands did she make
Of crow-flowers, nettles, daisies, and long purples,
That liberal shepherds give a grosser name,
But our cold maids do dead men's fingers call them.

It is not known which "grosser name" Shakespeare might have had in mind, but folk names given to plants in the Orchis family, based on their resemblance to testicles, include "dogstones", "dog's cods", "cullions" and "fool's ballocks".

However, Shakespeare's allusion is uncertain, as no contemporary herbals apply the name of "long purples" or "dead men's fingers" to Orchis mascula. (Sidney Beisly, writing in 1864, claimed that certain other species of orchid were known as "dead men's fingers" on account of their palmate roots, and that this name may have been mistakenly transferred over to Orchis mascula, but this has been called an "unverifiable assumption".) Some scholars, such as Karl P. Wentersdorf, therefore prefer to identify the "long purples" with Arum maculatum.

Another folk name of Orchis mascula is "Gethsemane" (after the Garden of Gethsemane, in which, according to the Bible, Jesus prayed on the night before his crucifixion). This name is derived from a legend "that O. mascula grew below the cross of Christ, and that the markings on the leaves are drops of Christ's blood".
