= Stoke Wood End Quarter =

Nature reserve in Northamptonshire, England

Coordinates: 52.465°N 0.724°W

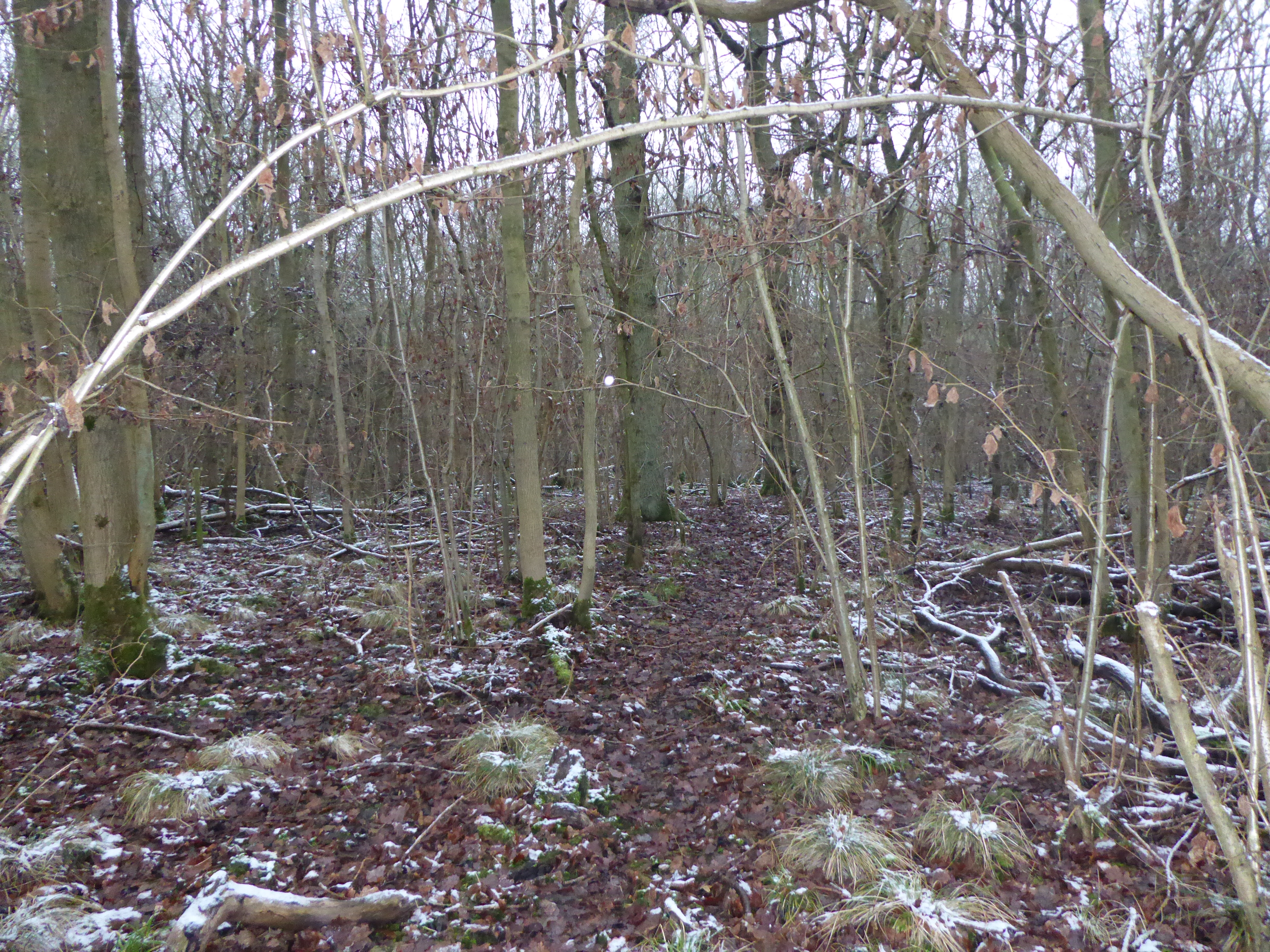
- Interactive map of Stoke Wood End Quarter
- Type: Nature reserve
- Location: Corby, Northamptonshire
- OS grid: SP 800 859
- Area: 0.7 hectares (1.7 acres)
- Manager: Wildlife Trust for Bedfordshire, Cambridgeshire and Northamptonshire

Stoke Wood End Quarter is a 0.7-hectare (1.7-acre) nature reserve west of Corby in Northamptonshire. It is managed by the Wildlife Trust for Bedfordshire, Cambridgeshire and Northamptonshire, and is part of the Stoke and Bowd Lane Woods Site of Special Scientific Interest.

The main trees in this wood are oak, ash, hazel and blackthorn. There are flowers such as early purple orchid and twayblade, birds including treecreepers and tawny owls, while comma and small tortoiseshell butterflies feed in open glades in summer.

Stoke Wood is divided into three areas. The eastern half is managed by the Woodland Trust and the western area is privately owned. The End Quarter is a small triangular area which stretches south from the middle. There is access to the Wildlife Trust site by a footpath from the B669, Desborough Road and then through the Woodland Trust area.
