= Stoke and Bowd Lane Woods =

Site of Special Scientific Interest in Northamptonshire, England

Coordinates: 52.47°N 0.82°W

- Site of Special Scientific Interest
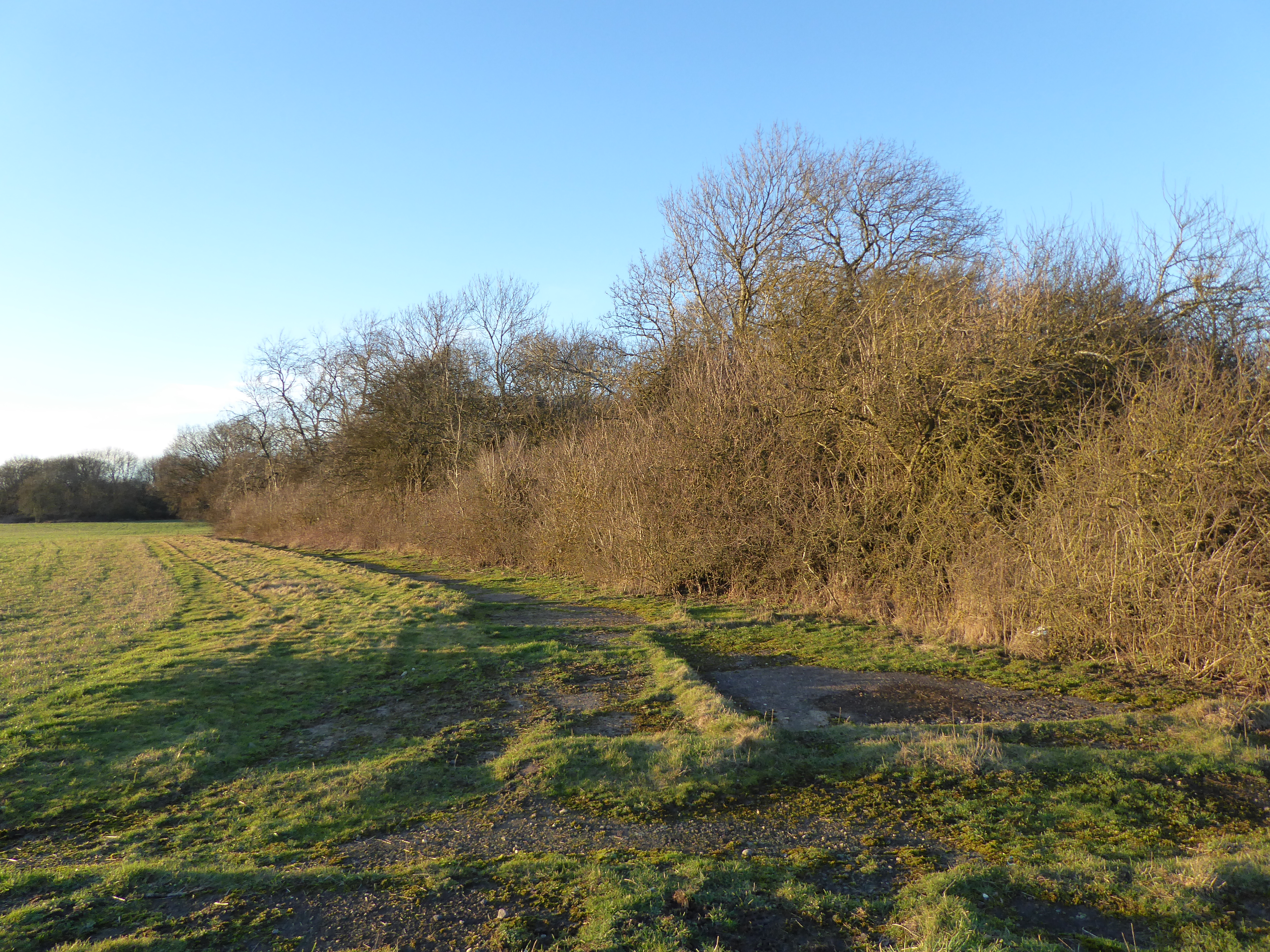
- Bowd Lane Wood
- Location of Stoke and Bowd Lane Woods.
- Area of search: Northamptonshire
- Grid reference: SP 802 864
- Interest: Biological
- Area: 36.4 hectares
- Notification date: 1986
- Location map: Magic Map

Stoke and Bowd Lane Woods is a 36.4-hectare (90-acre) biological Site of Special Scientific Interest west of Corby in Northamptonshire. The eastern half of Stoke Wood is managed by the Woodland Trust, a triangular area of 0.7 hectares which stretches south from the middle is the Stoke Wood End Quarter, a nature reserve managed by the Wildlife Trust for Bedfordshire, Cambridgeshire and Northamptonshire, and the remaining western part of the wood is private property. Bowd Lane Wood is private property.

These ancient semi-natural woods were formerly part of the medieval Royal Forest of Rockingham. The main tree species is pedunculate oak, with other species such as ash and birch. Ground flora include herb paris, wood sorrel, yellow archangel, early-purple orchid and greater butterfly-orchid.

There is public access to the parts of Stoke Wood managed by the Woodland Trust and the Wildlife Trust by a track from the B669, Desborough Road.
