= Eggerth =

Eggerth is a surname. Notable people with the surname include:

- Agnė Eggerth (born 1978), Lithuanian sprinter
- Karl Eggerth (1861–1888), Austrian lichenologist
- Marta Eggerth (1912–2013), Hungarian actress and singer
- Sabine Eggerth (1943–2017), German actress

== See also ==
- Eggert
