= Diter von Wettstein =

Plant geneticist (1929–2017)

- Born: Dietrich Holger Wettstein Ritter von Westersheim; 20 September 1929; Göttingen, Germany
- Died: 13 April 2017 (aged 87)
- Education: University of Tübingen; University of Stockholm
- Known for: Barley mutants; chloroplast development; chlorophyll biosynthesis
- Spouse: Penny von Wettstein-Knowles
- Children: 2
- Father: Fritz von Wettstein
- Relatives: Richard Wettstein (grandfather)
- Awards: International Member of the National Academy of Sciences (1981)
- Scientific career
- Fields: Plant genetics
- Workplaces: University of Stockholm; University of Copenhagen; Carlsberg Laboratory; Washington State University

Diter von Wettstein (born Dietrich Holger Wettstein Ritter von Westersheim; 20 September 1929 – 13 April 2017) was a plant geneticist whose research included barley mutants, chloroplast development, chlorophyll biosynthesis, plant breeding, and cereal biotechnology. He held positions at the University of Stockholm, the University of Copenhagen, the Carlsberg Laboratory, and Washington State University.

== Early life, education, and family ==
von Wettstein was born in Göttingen, Germany. He was the son of Austrian botanist Friedrich "Fritz" Wettstein Ritter von Westersheim and Else Therese Jesser von Wettstein; his father studied the genetics, polyploidy, cytoplasmic inheritance, and developmental physiology of mosses. His mother studied botany in Vienna and algae in Uppsala. His grandfather was also a botanist, Richard von Wettstein Ritter von Westersheim, a professor of botany in Prague and director of the Botanical Garden there.

In 1953, von Wettstein received two doctoral degrees, one from the University of Tübingen in biology and biochemistry and one from the University of Stockholm in genetics; the second doctoral degree in Sweden facilitated him obtaining a position there. In 1957, he received a DSc degree in genetics from the University of Stockholm. His early work included barley mutagenesis, genetics of chlorophyll synthesis, and electron microscopy of developing chloroplasts. In 1958, he held a Rockefeller fellowship for research and training in the United States, including work at the California Institute of Technology, Cold Spring Harbor Laboratory, and the Carnegie Institution of Washington at Stanford University.

von Wettstein was married to biochemist Penny von Wettstein-Knowles, whom he met at the University of California, Davis. They had two daughters, Heidi and Kim.

== Career ==
From 1957 to 1962, von Wettstein was an assistant and then associate professor in genetics at the University of Stockholm. In 1962, he became professor of genetics and head of the Institute of Genetics at the University of Copenhagen. In 1972, he moved to the Carlsberg Laboratory as head of the Department of Physiology, a position he held until his retirement in 1996; during this time, he also served as head of Carlsberg Plant Breeding. He was a visiting professor at the University of California, Davis, where he collaborated with Paul Stumpf on chloroplast lipid biosynthesis in barley mutants. After retiring from the Carlsberg Laboratory, he continued research at Washington State University as the R. A. Nilan Distinguished Professor in the Department of Crop and Soil Sciences, School of Molecular Biosciences, and Center for Integrated Biotechnology.

== Research ==
von Wettstein had two major focus areas, barley genetics and chloroplast biology, and he combined these interests. During his years in Sweden and Denmark, he collected nearly 360 barley mutant strains with defects in pigment biosynthesis. These mutants were genetically characterized at more than 105 loci and contributed to resources at the Nordic Gene Bank and the Carlsberg Laboratory. von Wettstein used genetic, biochemical, and microscopic analysis of barley mutants to study chloroplast development and chlorophyll biosynthesis. In work published in 1959, he used microscopy to show that primary thylakoid layers of the chloroplast are formed by alignment of vesicles that bud off from the inner membrane of the plastid envelope. He was as being among the earliest researchers to demonstrate structural changes in plastid development from the proplastid to chloroplast stage. von Wettstein's research group helped elucidate these early steps in chlorophyll biosynthesis, and they later cloned several genes in the chlorophyll biosynthesis pathway.

While working in Denmark, von Wettstein collaborated with Mogens Westergaard to study crossing-over, chromosome ultrastructure, and the synaptonemal complex.

His applied research included barley traits relevant to malting, beer production, animal feed, stem rust resistance, and wheat proteins associated with celiac disease.

== Honors and awards ==
- Elected to the US National Academy of Sciences in 1981.
- He was a member of scientific academies and organizations including the European Molecular Biology Organization, Academia Europaea, the Royal Danish Academy of Sciences and Letters, the Royal Swedish Academy of Sciences, the Royal Belgian Academy of Sciences, and the German National Academy of Sciences Leopoldina.
- Received a decoration for outstanding service to the Republic of Austria.
