= Fritz von Wettstein =

Austrian botanist (1895–1945)

- Born: Friedrich Wettstein, Ritter von Westersheim; June 24, 1895; Prague, Kingdom of Bohemia, Austria-Hungary
- Died: February 12, 1945 (aged 49); Trins, Tirol, Austria
- Children: Diter von Wettstein
- Scientific career
- Fields: Botany
- Institutions: University of Göttingen; Ludwig-Maximilians-Universität München

Friedrich Wettstein, Ritter von Westersheim (24 June 1895 – 12 February 1945) was an Austrian botanist.

== Academic career ==
Fritz Wettstein was the son of botanist Richard Wettstein, the brother of zoologist Otto von Wettstein, and the father of plant geneticist Diter von Wettstein. From 1925, he was professor at the University of Göttingen, in 1931 at the Ludwig-Maximilians-Universität München, and in 1934 director of the Kaiser Wilhelm Institute for Biology in Berlin-Dahlem.

Wettstein made a major contribution to botanical and genetical science. He worked especially on cytoplasmic inheritance in mosses and fireweed. Following Erwin Baur at the Kaiser Wilhelm Institut, Berlin-Dahlem, he investigated hybrids and polyploids of mosses, and advanced the understanding of the relationships and characteristics of polyploid forms.

== National Socialist period ==
Historian Sheila Faith Weiss has described von Wettstein as one of several Kaiser Wilhelm Society geneticists whose international activities during the Third Reich served the aims of German foreign and cultural policy. In 1937, von Wettstein visited the United States after an invitation from the Carnegie Institution of Washington's genetics department at Cold Spring Harbor; on the same trip, he also gave a talk at the American Genetics Society meeting in Indianapolis. Weiss argues that his report on the trip combined observations on American scientific organization with recommendations for strengthening German genetics and countering anti-German opinion abroad.

In 1940, von Wettstein gave lectures in Bulgaria at the invitation of the Bulgarian Agricultural Ministry. Weiss interprets his report on Bulgarian plant breeding and genetics as part of an effort to advance German influence in agricultural science in eastern Europe.

== Works ==
- Morphologie und Physiologie des Formwechsels der Moose auf genetischer Grundlage (1924)
- Über plasmatische Vererbung sowie Plasma-und Genwirkung (1930)
- Genetik (1932)
- Karl von Goebel (1933)
