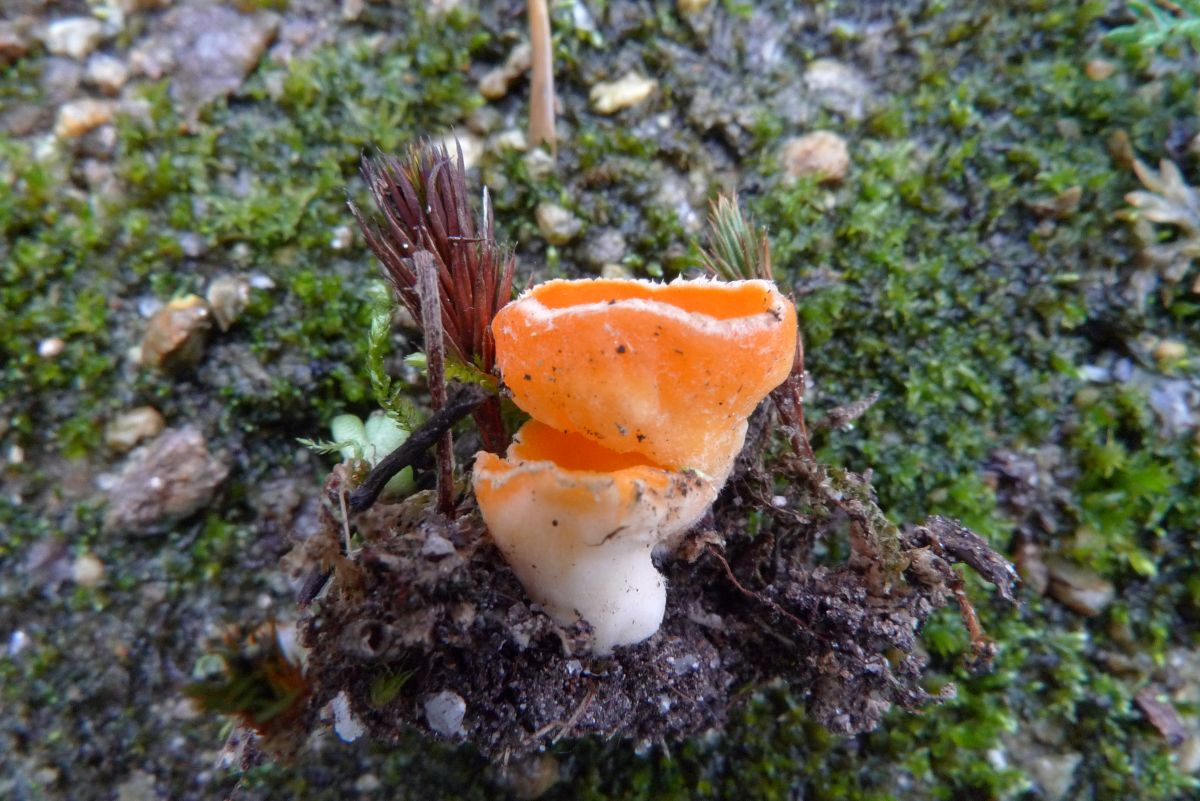
- Neottiella rutilans

Scientific classification
- Domain: Eukaryota
- Kingdom: Fungi
- Division: Ascomycota
- Class: Pezizomycetes
- Order: Pezizales
- Family: Pyronemataceae
- Genus: Neottiella (Cooke) Sacc. (1889)

Type species
- Neottiella albocincta (Berk. & M.A.Curtis) Sacc. (1889)

Synonyms
- Peziza subgen. Neottiella Cooke (1879); Peziza subgen. Scypharia Quél. (1886); Scypharia (Quél.) Quél. (1886); Neottiopezis Clem. (1903)

= Neottiella =

Genus of fungi

Neottiella is a genus of fungi in the family Pyronemataceae. It was circumscribed by Italian mycologist Pier Andrea Saccardo in 1889.

== Species ==
- Neottiella albocincta
- Neottiella aphanodictyon
- Neottiella carneorufa
- Neottiella crozalsiana
- Neottiella hetieri
- Neottiella hoehneliana
- Neottiella ithacaensis
- Neottiella macrospora
- Neottiella microspora
- Neottiella ricciicola
- Neottiella rutilans
- Neottiella sericeovillosa
- Neottiella trabutiana
- Neottiella vivida
