= Fritz Kerner von Marilaun =

Friedrich "Fritz" Kerner von Marilaun (June 30, 1866 – April 26, 1944) was an Austrian geologist, meteorologist and artist. He took a keen interest in paleoclimatology and earth history, constructing some early representations of the Earth during the Jurassic. He wrote the book Paläoklimatologie (1930).

== Life and work ==
Von Marilaun was born in Innsbruck, the son of the botanist Anton Kerner von Marilaun and his wife Maria née Ebner von Rofenstein. He was also the nephew of Josef Anton Kerner (1829–1906). Following his father's wishes he studied medicine at the University of Vienna but also attending lectures in mathematics and meteorology. He also trained in art and studied languages. He received his MD in 1891 and joined the Vienna Hygiene Institute but two years later he joined the Reich geological institute (Geologische Reichsanstalt) first as a trainee and then as a geologist conducting surveys of Dalmatia and worked on producing geological maps in the series Geologische Spezialkarte Osterreich-Ungarns (Geological Special Map of Austro-Hungary). By 1918 he became a chief geologist. He also collected geological specimens which he placed in the family villa near Trins in the Gschnitztal valley. He examined the snow-line and ground temperatures during his travels and began to combine knowledge of ancient climate, fossil life, plant biology (including ideas from his father), and geology. During World War I he was able to examine northern Albania and after the war he was no longer able to visit Dalmatia. He travelled and studied Mexico, Brazil, India, Spitzbergen and Sudan. In 1922 he was given the title of Hofrat. He retired in the 1930s and lived at the Marilaun Villa near Trins. He died in Seefeld following heart problems and finally a heart attack. He is buried at the Protestant cemetery in Simmering.
