= Vestergaard =

Vestergaard [ˈvestɐˌkɒˀ] is a Danish surname, literally meaning west farm. Note that the double a is equivalent of å in common nouns and is retained from the pre-1948 orthography in proper nouns only. The form Westergaard is an uncommon cognate. Vestergaard is also a common surname in the Faroe Islands.

Vestergaard may refer to:

- Jacob Vestergaard (b. 1961) - Faroese politician
- Jakob Vestergaard (b. 1975) - Danish handball coach
- Jannik Vestergaard (b. 1992) - Danish athlete in football
- Jeppe Vestergaard (b. 1972) - Danish athlete in football
- Kurt Vestergaard (1935–2021) - Danish cartoonist (a.k.a. Kurt Westergaard)
- Lene Vestergaard Hau (b. 1959) - Danish physicist
- Mads Vestergaard (b. 2002) - Danish athlete in badminton
- Mette Vestergaard (b. 1973) - Danish athlete in handball
- Mikkel Vestergaard (b. 1992) - Danish athlete in football
- Rasmus Vestergaard Madsen (b. 1991) - Danish politician
- Søren Vestergaard (b. 1972) - Danish athlete in cricket
- Søren Ulrik Vestergaard (b. 1987) - Danish athlete in football

== See also ==
- Westergaard
