= Otto von Wettstein =

Austrian zoologist

Otto von Wettstein, name also given as Otto Wettstein-Westersheimb, (7 August 1892, in Vienna – 10 July 1967) was an Austrian zoologist. He was the son of botanist Richard Wettstein and the brother of botanist Fritz von Wettstein. He is best remembered for his work in the field of herpetology; of his 205 published scientific papers, 60 of these involved herpetological topics.

Due to spells of severe tympanitis in his youth, Wettstein's hearing was greatly impaired as an adult. Beginning in 1915, he was associated with the Naturhistorisches Museum in Vienna. Here, his instructors included zoologists Karl Grobben and Franz Werner as well as paleontologist Othenio Abel. In 1920, he succeeded Friedrich Siebenrock as curator of the herpetological collection at the museum. Under Wettstein's helm, within five years, the museum's reptile and amphibian collection became one of the largest in Europe.

With Franz Werner and botanist Karl Heinz Rechinger, he accumulated a collection of vertebrates from southeastern Europe, publishing "Die Vogelwelt der Ägäis " (The Birds of the Aegean, 1938) and "Die Säugetierwelt der Ägäis " (The Mammals of the Aegean, 1941) as a result. His work on Aegean amphibians and reptiles, "Herpetologia Aegaea ", was based on excursions to the region in 1934, 1935, 1942 and 1954. In collaboration with others, he made important contributions to the multi-volume series "Catalogus faunae Austriae ".

After World War II, he worked as a forestry manager at the Federal Research Institute of Forestry in Mariabrunn. A subspecies of viper, Vipera ursinii wettsteini (Knöpfler & Sochurek, 1955) is named after him.
