= Anton Kerner von Marilaun =

Austrian botanist and professor

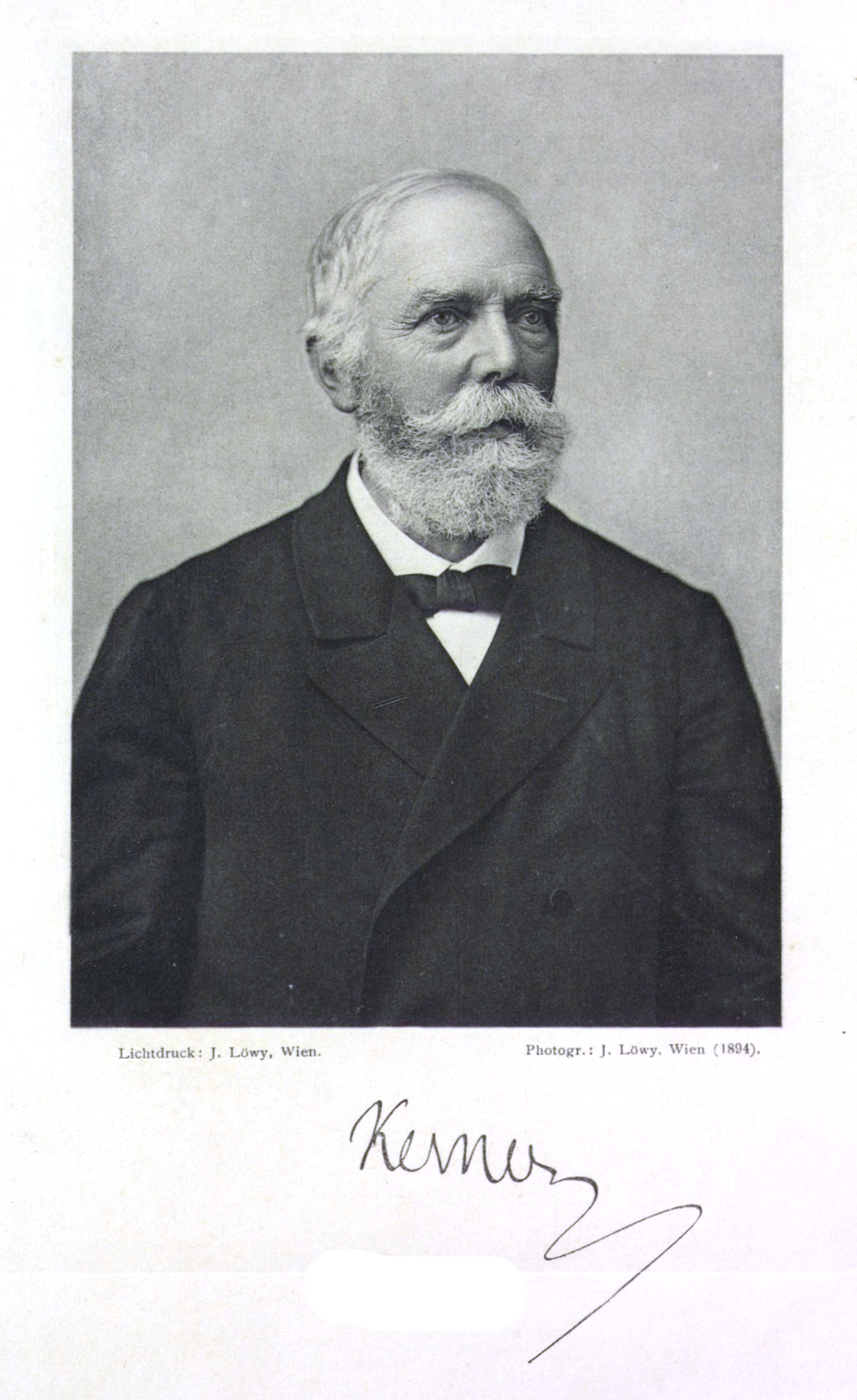
- Anton Kerner von Marilaun, 1894
- Born: 12 November 1831; Mautern an der Donau, Lower Austria
- Died: 21 June 1898 (aged 66); Vienna
- Education: Vienna
- Known for: Das Pflanzenleben der Donauländer (The Plant Life of the Danube Lands)
- Children: Fritz Kerner von Marilaun (son)
- Scientific career
- Fields: Botany
- Institutions: Polytechnic Institute, Buda; University of Innsbruck; University of Vienna
- Author abbrev. (botany): A.Kern.

Anton Kerner Ritter von Marilaun, or Anton Joseph Kerner, (12 November 1831 – 21 June 1898) was an Austrian botanist, physician, and professor at the University of Innsbruck and later at the University of Vienna. The standard author abbreviation A.Kern. is used to indicate this person as the author when citing a botanical name. Von Marilaun emphasized the concept of plant sociology or the species that plants were typically found associated with in his geographical studies of species. Inspired by the work of Alexander von Humboldt and others he examined climatological and historical factors in the distributions of plant species.

== Career ==
Kerner was born in Mautern, Lower Austria, and studied medicine in Vienna, graduating in 1854 with a medical degree. He also studied the flora of Wachau. He then became a teacher at Often and continued his studies in natural history. In 1858 Kerner was appointed professor of botany at the Polytechnic Institute at Buda, and then in 1860 was appointed professor of natural history at the University of Innsbruck. During this period he carried out phytosociologic studies in Central Europe. He resigned the latter position in 1878 to become professor of systematic botany at the University of Vienna, and also curator of the botanical garden there. As part of his expansive exsiccata series Flora exsiccata Austro-Hungarica, which he started in 1881, von Marilaun recruited botanists as collectors including Vincze von Borbás, Karl Eggerth and later as editor including Richard Wettstein.

In 1863 he wrote in his Das Pflanzenleben der Donauländer that much more was known about the plants of south America than of Austro-Hungary thanks to a traveller like Alexander von Humboldt. He set about fixing this imbalance by examining in detail the physical structure of vegetation in the region. He examined plants and their associations. Kerner was particularly active in the fields of phytogeography and phytosociology. Kerner also examined plant-insect interactions and noted the role of mechanical defences, chemicals, stinging hairs and so on and termed the relationship as "armed freedom." He was knighted and given the title of Ritter von Marilaun in 1877. Marilaun was the summer family home in Trins in the Gschnitztal valley. Here he established an alpine garden. He compared the growth of plants in this garden and at Vienna and Innsbruck conducing an altitudinal adaptation experiment for 6 years involving about 300 annuals and perennials. He died of a stroke in 1898 in Vienna at the age of 67.

He said "… and years pass by until a second generation [of plants] can develop stronger and richer on the prepared soil; but restless works the plant kingdom and constructs its green building further; on the corpses of perished roots, new, younger plant forms germinate, and so it goes on in tireless change until, finally, the shady treetops of a high forest murmur above a humus rich soil."

Kerner's son Fritz became a pioneer paleoclimatologist and geologist.

== Publications ==
- Das Pflanzenleben der Donauländer (The Background of Plant Ecology, translated by Henry S. Conard, 1951), Innsbruck, 1863. This book established his reputation and reports on his botanical explorations in Hungary.
- Die Kultur der Alpenflanzen, 1864. On the culture of alpine plants.
- Die botanischen Gärten, 1874. A sketch of a model botanical garden.
- Vegetationsverhältnisse des mittlern und östlichen Ungarn und Siebenbürgen, Innsbruck, 1875.
- von Marilaun, Anton Kerner (1895–96). The natural history of plants, their forms, growth, reproduction, and distribution', trans. FW Oliver et al. from Pflanzenleben, 1890-1891. New York: Holt. p. 4: 603. See also HTML version

One of his most important works. In 1867, he finished the publication of the results of his studies with respect to the limits of vegetation of more than a thousand species of plants.

== See also ==
- Frederic Clements
- Eugenius Warming
