= Karl Eggerth =

Austrian lichenologist (1861–1888)

Karl Eggerth junior
- Born: 1 November 1861; Vienna
- Died: 30 March 1888 (aged 26); Vienna
- Resting place: Vienna Central Cemetery
- Scientific career
- Fields: Botany, Lichenology.

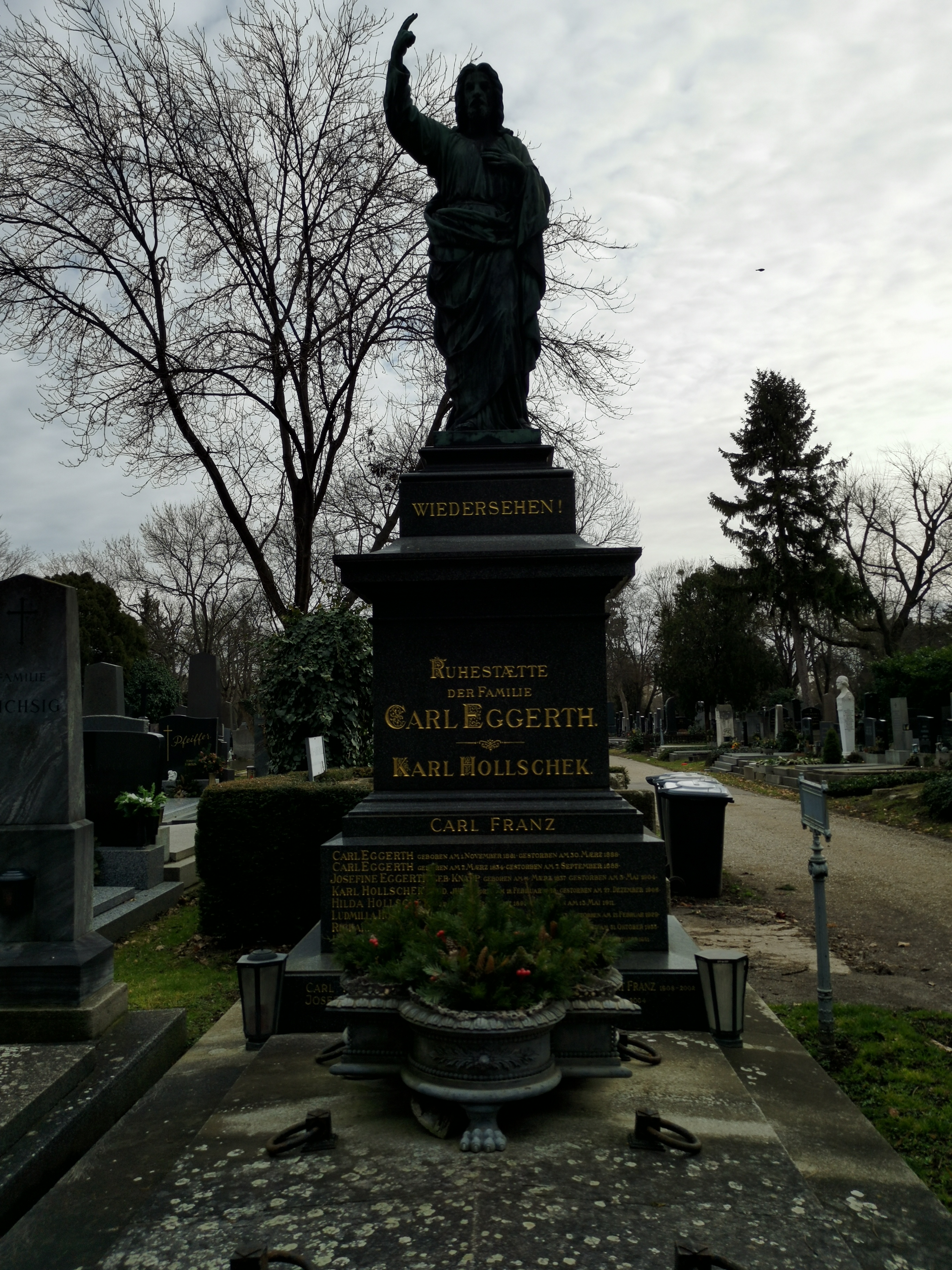
The Eggerth family grave, at the Vienna Central Cemetery

Karl Eggerth junior (1861–1888) was an Austrian botanist and medical student who specialised in collecting lichen specimens.

The grandson of the owner of the Viennese Karolinenbad and Esterházybad bathhouses of Mariahilf district, Josef Eggerth (1804-1878), and the son of Karl Eggerth the elder (1834-1888), the younger Karl was born on 1 November, 1861, into a prominent, wealthy family. His father had taken over the running of his father's bathhouses by the 1850s, and it is for Karl Eggerth senior that the Eggerthgasse was renamed in his honour.

Along with the Eggerth's entrepreneurial spirit, the family was also interested in natural history. Josef had donated a specimen of Deinotherium giganteum to the Imperial-Royal Geological Institution of Vienna, which had been unearthed during excavations for the Esterházybad in 1857. Karl senior was a mineral and meteorite collector, who had donated glass models, zoological specimens, and fragments of a meteorite to the Kremsmünster monastic observatory.

By 1880, Karl junior had graduated from the Kremsmünster Stiftsgymnasium (Kremsmünster monastic secondary school) and started to study medicine in Vienna. But Eggerth's true passion was lichenology, and from the time he graduated from the Gymnasium until his death, he undertook many collecting trips, and purchased and exchanged specimens to build a personal collection of approximately 35,000 specimens. He was friends with Richard Wettstein, and together they founded the student-led Natural Science Association at the University of Vienna in 1882. Eggerth was also close friends with Hugó Lojka, and arranged his scientific estate after his death.

From 1882 Eggerth was a member of the Zoologisch-Botanischen Gesellschaft in Wien (Zoological-Botanical Society of Vienna) and from 1886 he was a member of the Deutsche Botanische Gesellschaft (the German Botanical Society). Both Wettstein and Eggerth were recruited by Anton Kerner von Marilaun to collect specimens for his exsiccata work Flora exsiccata Austro-Hungarica exsiccata, but he also collected for Arnold's Lichenes exsiccati, and Lojka's exsiccata Lichenotheca universalis, which is how specimens collected by Karl Eggerth have entered herbarium collections around the world.

After heart disease causing a "brief, painful illness" Karl junior died on March 30, 1888, and was interred at the Vienna Central Cemetery in the family grave. He never completed his medical studies.

== Collections ==
Eggerth cultivated relationships with many lichenologists of his time, which included his acquisition of a large part of August von Krempelhuber's Europäischen Flechten (European Lichens).

After Eggerth's death his father, donated his son's personal herbarium to the then-Botanical Museum of the University of Vienna (now known as the Herbarium der Universität Wien (WU)). Specimens collected by Eggerth today can be found in herbaria including Herbarium der Universität Wien, the National Herbarium of Victoria, Royal Botanic Gardens Victoria, and the Herbarium of Te Papa Tongarewa

His microscope and portrait are still cared for by the museum at Kremsmünster.

== Significant publications ==
- Karl Eggerth (1887) "Nachtrag zur Lichenenflora von Corfu." Flora oder Allgemeine Botanische Zeitung. 70: 482.PDF
