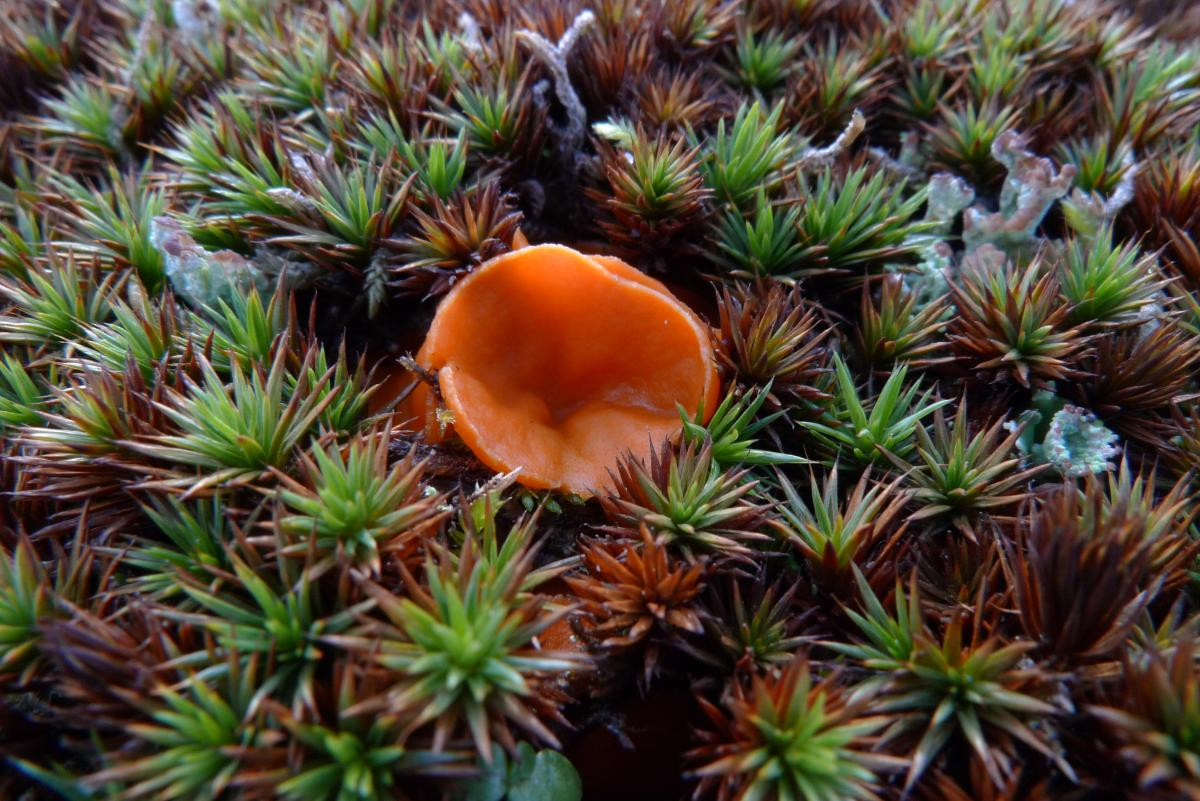

Scientific classification
- Kingdom: Fungi
- Division: Ascomycota
- Class: Pezizomycetes
- Order: Pezizales
- Family: Pyronemataceae
- Genus: Neottiella
- Species: N. rutilans

Binomial name
- Neottiella rutilans Fr., 1822

= Neottiella rutilans =

Species of fungus

Neottiella rutilans is a species of apothecial fungus belonging to the family Pyronemataceae. This European species appears in autumn as bright yellowish-orange discs among Polytrichum and related mosses.

== Description ==
This cup fungus has a shallow, somewhat uneven cup and a short stem. The upper surface is yellow, often tinged with reddish-orange, and the underside is covered by a dense felting of white hairs.

== Ecology ==
This fungus tends to grow among mosses, particularly Polytrichum species, on sandy soils on heaths and drier moorland, appearing in the autumn and winter. Like other cup fungi, the upper surface is the spore-producing surface and as it faces upwards, the spores cannot fall out. Instead, the spores are ejected when the fungus is disturbed; if the cup is given a sharp tap when it is mature, a cloud of spores rises in a thin mist.
