= Øjvind Winge =

Danish biologist

- Born: 19 May 1886; Aarhus, Jutland, Denmark
- Died: 5 April 1964 (aged 77)
- Scientific career
- Fields: Genetics
- Institutions: Carlsberg Laboratory
- Thesis: The chromosomes: their numbers and general importance
- Author abbrev. (botany): Winge

Øjvind Winge (19 May 1886 – 5 April 1964) was a Danish biologist and a pioneer in yeast genetics.

== Education ==
Winge was born in the city of Aarhus in Jutland, the mainland of Denmark. After completing secondary school he travelled to the University of Copenhagen to study law but found himself more suited to the biological sciences into which he transferred. He graduated with a master's degree in the year 1910. From Copenhagen he travelled to Stockholm, Paris and Chicago, studying mainly chromosomal cytology before finally returning to the University of Copenhagen to do a doctoral thesis entitled The Chromosomes: Their Numbers and General Importance. In 1910 Winge was appointed chair of genetics at the Royal Veterinary and Agricultural University, Copenhagen, where amongst other works he wrote The Textbook in Genetics, published in 1928.

== Career ==
In 1933 Winge was offered and accepted the position of Director of the Physiology Department in the Carlsberg Laboratory, Copenhagen. Here he dedicated his research to the 3 principal lifeforms of interest to his benefactors; hops, barley and yeast, although his studies became increasingly dedicated to yeast. He developed and used techniques to achieve the micromanipulation of single yeast cells and spores in order to investigate them on a genetic level. He found that yeast spores are haploid, and diploid cells occur as a result of conjugation of two haploid cells or self-diploidisation. This was important as it revealed that the species exhibits alternation and that strains can be genetically manipulated by specific mating. Winge also demonstrated that the traits of the organisms were mainly governed by simple Mendelian rules. He continued his research and his lab produced a steady output of genetics papers until 1961.

Winge's work was of critical importance to the basic formation of early genetic engineering and biotechnology. He helped to establish a firm basis for what have now developed into important and lucrative scientific fields. For this reason he is often attributed the title of 'The Father of Yeast Genetics'.

== Winge's 1917 hypothesis ==
In his 1917 doctoral thesis The Chromosomes: Their Numbers and General Importance, Winge presented his hypothesis of plant hybridization, which has motivated much research.

Polyploidy has attracted scientific study for almost a century, since de Vries first described the Gigas ‘mutant’ of Oenothera lamarckiana, which was later shown to be a tetraploid ... Winge ... subsequently observed that different chromosome numbers within genera followed an arithmetic progression of multiplication (within the Asteraceae, for example, some species are 2n $=$ 18, others 2n $=$ 36, 54, and so on). This led Winge to propose a hypothesis of hybridisation followed by doubling of the chromosome complement. Successful attempts to create ‘synthetic’ polyploids confirmed this hypothesis and helped to demonstrate potential mechanisms by which polyploidy could arise naturally ...

== Awards and honours ==
Winge was elected foreign member of the Royal Society in 1947.

== Selected bibliography ==
- Ferdinandsen, C. & Winge, Ø. (1910) Fungi from Professor Warming's expedition to Venezuela and the West Indies. Botanisk Tidsskrift, 30, 211-.
- Ferdinandsen, C. & Winge, Ø. (1914) Ostenfeldiella - a new genus of Plasmodiophoraceae. Annals of Botany, 28, 643-649. Named for Carl Hansen Ostenfeld.
- Winge Ø. (1914) Investigations on hops (Humulus lupulus, L.). III. The pollination and fertilization process in Humulus lupulus L. and H. japonicus Sieb. et. Zucc. Comptes Rendus des Travaux du Laboratoire Carlsberg, 11, 1-46.
- Winge, Ø. (1917) The chromosomes: their numbers and general importance. Comptes Rendus des Travaux du Laboratoire Carlsberg, 13, 131-275. Doctoral thesis.
- Winge, Ø. (1928) Textbook in Genetics (Danish title: Arvelighedslære paa eksperimentelt og cytologisk Grundlag). 2nd edn. 1937; 3rd end. 1945. København.
- Winge Ø. (1931) X- and Y-linked inheritance in Melandrium. Hereditas, 15, 127-165.
- Winge, Ø. (1935) On haplophase and diplophase of some Saccharomycetes. Comptes Rendus des Travaux du Laboratoire Carlsberg. Série Physiologique, 21, 77-111.
- Winge, Ø. (1950) Inheritance in dogs: with special reference to hunting breeds. Ithaca, New York. 153 p.
