= Gustav Sennholz =

German-Austrian gardener

Gustav Sennholz (5 March 1850 in Frankfurt am Main – 24 August 1895 in Vienna) was a German-Austrian gardener and horticulturist.

Following studies in Kassel (Bergpark Wilhelmshöhe), he was associated with the "Gärtnerlehranstalt" in Potsdam (1869–70). From 1874 to 1884, he worked as a gardener in Bockenheim, afterwards serving as munincipal gardener in Vienna (1884–1895). From 1885 to 1888, he supervised construction of the city's "Türkenschanzpark".

The orchid species Dactyloglossum sennholzii is named in his honor.

== Works involving Gustav Sennholz ==
- G. Sennholz; Berlin : Gebrüder Borntraeger, 1895, by Paul Wilhelm Magnus.
