= Richard Wettstein =

Austrian botanist (1863–1931)

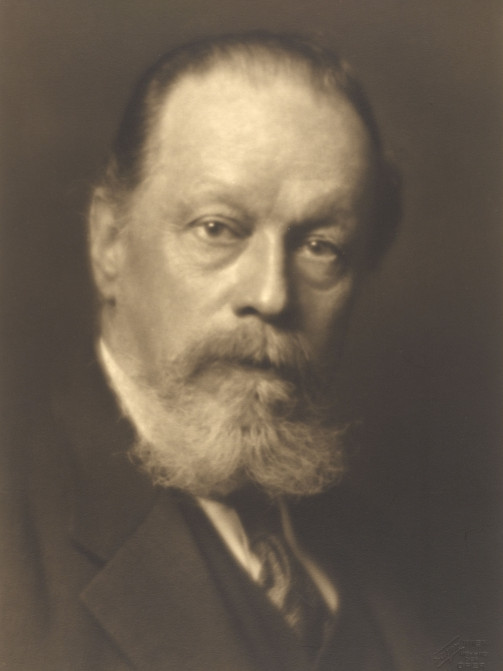
- Richard Wettstein in 1927
- Born: 30 June 1863; Vienna, Austrian Empire
- Died: 10 August 1931 (aged 68); Trins, First Austrian Republic
- Education: University of Vienna
- Children: Fritz von Wettstein; Otto von Wettstein
- Relatives: Diter von Wettstein (grandson)
- Scientific career
- Fields: Botany

Richard Wettstein (30 June 1863 – 10 August 1931) was an Austrian botanist. His taxonomic system, the Wettstein system, was one of the earliest based on phyletic principles.

Wettstein studied in Vienna under Anton Kerner von Marilaun and later married Kerner's daughter Adele. Their sons included the botanist Fritz von Wettstein and the zoologist Otto von Wettstein. His grandson Diter von Wettstein was a plant geneticist. During his time at the University of Vienna, he founded the student-led Natural Science Association with his friend Karl Eggerth in 1882.

He was a professor at the University of Prague from 1892, and at the University of Vienna from 1899. He newly laid out the Botanical Garden of the University of Vienna.

In 1901 he became president of the Vienna Zoological-Botanical Society (Zoologisch-Botanische Gesellschaft), and during the same year took part in a scientific expedition to Brazil. In 1919 he was appointed vice-president of the Vienna Academy of Sciences. During his later years (1929–30), he traveled with his son, Friedrich, to eastern and southern Africa.

The mycological genus Wettsteinina and the Wettsteiniola genus of flowering plants from Brazil, belonging to the family Podostemaceae, are both named for Richard Wettstein.

In 1905, he was co-president of the International Botanical Congress, held in Vienna.

In 1913 Wettstein edited and distributed the last fascicles (specimens no. 3601-4000) of the exsiccata work Flora exsiccata Austro-Hungarica, a museo botanico universitatis vindobonensis edita.

== Selected publications ==
- Nolanaceae, Solanaceae, Scrophulariaceae in (Engler & Prantl 1895, pp. 1–107).
- Grundzüge der geographisch-morphologischen Methode der Pflanzensystematik, 1898 - Basics of geographical-morphological methods of plant systematics.
- Botanik Und Zoologie In Österreich in den Jahren 1850 Bis 1900, 1901 - Botany and zoology in Austria in the years 1850 to 1900.
- Der Neo-Lamarckismus und seine Beziehungen zum Darwinismus, 1903 - Neo-Lamarckism and its relationship to Darwinism.
- Wettstein, Richard (1924). Handbuch der Systematischen Botanik 2 vols (3rd ed.). Vienna: Deuticke. Archived from the original on 18 February 2015.
  - 1st ed. 1901–1908 Vol. I 1901, Vol. II 1908 Deuticke, Vienna
  - 2nd ed. 1910–1911
  - 3rd ed. 1923–1924
  - 4th ed. 1933–1935

== See also ==
- Wettstein system

== Bibliography ==
- Chamberlain, Charles J. (January 1908). "Wettstein's Handbuch". Botanical Gazette. 45 (1): 58. doi:10.1086/329449. JSTOR 2467403.
- Engler, Adolf; Prantl, Karl, eds. (1895). Die Natürlichen Pflanzenfamilien nebst ihren Gattungen und wichtigeren Arten, insbesondere den Nutzpflanzen, unter Mitwirkung zahlreicher hervorragender Fachgelehrten 1887–1915 IV(3b). Leipzig: W. Engelmann.
- Ingeborg, Schinnerl (2014). "Wettstein, Richard". Aeiou Encyclopedia (in German and English).
- Janchen, Erwin (2013) [1933]. Richard Wettstein: Sein Leben und Wirken (in German). Springer-Verlag. ISBN 9783709153666.
- Stafleu, Frans A.; Cowan, Richard S. (1976–1988). Taxonomic literature: a selective guide to botanical publications and collections with dates, commentaries and types: Taxon. Lit., ed. 2 (TL2) (2nd ed.). Utrecht: Bohn, Scheltema & Holkema. ISBN 90-313-0224-4.
