= List of United Kingdom locations: South =

The United Kingdom

This is part of the list of United Kingdom locations: a gazetteer of place names in the United Kingdom showing each place's locality and geographical coordinates.

== South ==
=== South A-South C ===
| Location | Locality | Coordinates (links to map & photo sources) | OS grid reference |
|---|---|---|---|
| South Acre | Norfolk | 52.69°N 00.67°E | TF8114 |
| South Acton | Hounslow | 51.49°N 00.28°W | TQ1979 |
| South Alkham | Kent | 51.12°N 01.20°E | TR2441 |
| Southall | Ealing | 51.50°N 00.38°W | TQ1280 |
| South Allington | Devon | 50.22°N 03.69°W | SX7938 |
| South Alloa | Falkirk | 56.09°N 03.81°W | NS8791 |
| Southam | Cumbria | 54.49°N 03.56°W | NX9912 |
| Southam | Gloucestershire | 51.92°N 02.04°W | SO9725 |
| Southam | Warwickshire | 52.25°N 01.40°W | SP4162 |
| South Ambersham | West Sussex | 50.97°N 00.70°W | SU9120 |
| Southampton | City of Southampton | 50.91°N 01.40°W | SU4213 |
| South Anston | Rotherham | 53.34°N 01.23°W | SK5183 |
| South Ascot | Berkshire | 51.39°N 00.67°W | SU9267 |
| South Ashford | Kent | 51.13°N 00.85°E | TR0041 |
| Southay | Somerset | 50.96°N 02.81°W | ST4319 |
| South Aywick | Shetland Islands | 60.55°N 01.03°W | HU5386 |
| South Baddesley | Hampshire | 50.76°N 01.50°W | SZ3596 |
| South Ballachulish | Highland | 56.68°N 05.20°W | NN0459 |
| South Bank | Redcar and Cleveland | 54.57°N 01.18°W | NZ5320 |
| South Bank | York | 53.94°N 01.10°W | SE5950 |
| South Barrow | Somerset | 51.04°N 02.57°W | ST6027 |
| South Beach | Gwynedd | 52.87°N 04.42°W | SH3734 |
| South Beach | Northumberland | 55.10°N 01.49°W | NZ3279 |
| South Beddington | Sutton | 51.35°N 00.14°W | TQ2963 |
| South Benfleet | Essex | 51.54°N 00.55°E | TQ7786 |
| South Bents | Sunderland | 54.93°N 01.37°W | NZ4060 |
| South Bersted | West Sussex | 50.79°N 00.68°W | SU9300 |
| South Binness Island | Hampshire | 50.82°N 01.00°W | SU703037 |
| South Blainslie | Scottish Borders | 55.67°N 02.73°W | NT5443 |
| South Bockhampton | Dorset | 50.75°N 01.76°W | SZ1795 |
| South Boisdale | Western Isles | 57.12°N 07.39°W | NF7417 |
| Southborough | Bromley | 51.38°N 00.03°E | TQ4267 |
| Southborough | Kent | 51.15°N 00.25°E | TQ5842 |
| Southborough | Kingston upon Thames | 51.38°N 00.30°W | TQ1866 |
| Southbourne | Bournemouth | 50.71°N 01.80°W | SZ1491 |
| Southbourne | West Sussex | 50.83°N 00.92°W | SU7605 |
| South Bowood | Dorset | 50.77°N 02.79°W | SY4498 |
| South Brachmont | Aberdeenshire | 57.03°N 02.31°W | NO8194 |
| South Bramwith | Doncaster | 53.59°N 01.06°W | SE6211 |
| South Brent | Devon | 50.42°N 03.84°W | SX6960 |
| South Brewham | Somerset | 51.12°N 02.40°W | ST7236 |
| South Bromley | Tower Hamlets | 51.51°N 00.01°W | TQ3881 |
| Southbrook | Wiltshire | 51.07°N 02.27°W | ST8131 |
| South Broomage | Falkirk | 56.00°N 03.83°W | NS8681 |
| South Broomhill | Northumberland | 55.28°N 01.60°W | NZ2599 |
| Southburgh | Norfolk | 52.59°N 00.95°E | TG0004 |
| South Burlingham | Norfolk | 52.60°N 01.49°E | TG3707 |
| Southburn | East Riding of Yorkshire | 53.97°N 00.49°W | SE9954 |
| South Cadbury | Somerset | 51.02°N 02.52°W | ST6325 |
| South Carlton | Lincolnshire | 53.27°N 00.57°W | SK9576 |
| South Carlton | Nottinghamshire | 53.34°N 01.11°W | SK5983 |
| South Carne | Cornwall | 50.60°N 04.54°W | SX2081 |
| South Cave | East Riding of Yorkshire | 53.76°N 00.60°W | SE9231 |
| South Cerney | Gloucestershire | 51.67°N 01.94°W | SU0497 |
| South Chailey | East Sussex | 50.93°N 00.02°W | TQ3917 |
| South Chard | Somerset | 50.84°N 02.96°W | ST3205 |
| South Charlton | Northumberland | 55.47°N 01.74°W | NU1620 |
| South Cheriton | Somerset | 51.01°N 02.44°W | ST6924 |
| Southchurch | Essex | 51.53°N 00.73°E | TQ9085 |
| South Church | Durham | 54.64°N 01.67°W | NZ2128 |
| South Cliffe | East Riding of Yorkshire | 53.81°N 00.68°W | SE8736 |
| South Clifton | Nottinghamshire | 53.22°N 00.77°W | SK8270 |
| South Clunes | Highland | 57.43°N 04.41°W | NH5541 |
| South Cockerington | Lincolnshire | 53.37°N 00.05°E | TF3788 |
| South Common | Devon | 50.80°N 02.99°W | ST3001 |
| South Cookney | Aberdeenshire | 57.01°N 02.23°W | NO8692 |
| Southcombe | Oxfordshire | 51.94°N 01.52°W | SP3327 |
| South Cornelly | Bridgend | 51.50°N 03.71°W | SS8180 |
| South Corriegills | North Ayrshire | 55.56°N 05.12°W | NS0334 |
| South Corrielaw | Dumfries and Galloway | 55.13°N 03.30°W | NY1783 |
| Southcote | Bedfordshire | 51.91°N 0.68°W | SP9125 |
| Southcote | Berkshire | 51.43°N 01.02°W | SU6871 |
| Southcott | Cornwall | 50.72°N 04.56°W | SX1995 |
| Southcott | Devon | 50.92°N 04.22°W | SS4416 |
| Southcott | Wiltshire | 51.33°N 01.75°W | SU1759 |
| Southcourt | Buckinghamshire | 51.80°N 00.82°W | SP8112 |
| South Cove | Suffolk | 52.36°N 01.65°E | TM4980 |
| South Creake | Norfolk | 52.88°N 00.76°E | TF8635 |
| Southcrest | Worcestershire | 52.29°N 01.95°W | SP0366 |
| South Crosland | Kirklees | 53.60°N 01.83°W | SE1112 |
| South Croxton | Leicestershire | 52.68°N 00.99°W | SK6810 |
| South Croydon | Croydon | 51.35°N 00.10°W | TQ3263 |
| South Cuil | Highland | 57.58°N 06.36°W | NG3963 |

=== South D-South F ===
| Location | Locality | Coordinates (links to map & photo sources) | OS grid reference |
|---|---|---|---|
| South Dalton | East Riding of Yorkshire | 53.89°N 00.54°W | SE9645 |
| South Darenth | Kent | 51.39°N 00.24°E | TQ5669 |
| Southdean | Scottish Borders | 55.37°N 02.58°W | NT6309 |
| Southdene | Knowsley | 53.46°N 02.89°W | SJ4197 |
| South Denes | Norfolk | 52.57°N 01.73°E | TG5304 |
| South Down | Hampshire | 51.01°N 01.34°W | SU4624 |
| South Down | Somerset | 50.90°N 03.13°W | ST2012 |
| Southdown | Bath and North East Somerset | 51.36°N 02.38°W | ST7363 |
| Southdown | Cornwall | 50.34°N 04.20°W | SX4352 |
| South Duffield | North Yorkshire | 53.78°N 00.96°W | SE6833 |
| South Earlswood | Surrey | 51.20°N 00.18°W | TQ2747 |
| Southease | East Sussex | 50.82°N 00.01°E | TQ4205 |
| South Elkington | Lincolnshire | 53.37°N 00.06°W | TF2988 |
| South Elmsall | Wakefield | 53.59°N 01.29°W | SE4711 |
| South Elphinstone | East Lothian | 55.91°N 02.97°W | NT3970 |
| South End | Bedfordshire | 52.12°N 00.48°W | TL0448 |
| South End | Buckinghamshire | 51.91°N 00.76°W | SP8525 |
| South End | Cumbria | 54.05°N 03.22°W | SD2063 |
| South End | East Riding of Yorkshire | 53.84°N 00.19°W | TA1940 |
| South End | Greenwich | 51.445°N 0.0635°E, | TQ435738 |
| South End | Hampshire | 50.93°N 01.85°W | SU1015 |
| South End | Norfolk | 52.47°N 00.92°E | TL9990 |
| South End | North Lincolnshire | 53.66°N 00.32°W | TA1120 |
| South-end | Hertfordshire | 51.82°N 00.07°E | TL4316 |
| Southend | Argyll and Bute | 55.31°N 05.64°W | NR6908 |
| Southend (in Bradfield) | Berkshire | 51.42°N 01.15°W | SU5970 |
| Southend (in Brightwalton) | Berkshire | 51.49°N 01.39°W | SU4278 |
| Southend | Buckinghamshire | 51.59°N 00.91°W | SU7589 |
| Southend | Gloucestershire | 51.65°N 02.37°W | ST7495 |
| Southend | Lewisham | 51.42°N 00.01°W | TQ3871 |
| Southend | Oxfordshire | 51.70°N 01.16°W | SP5801 |
| Southend-on-Sea | Essex | 51.54°N 00.69°E | TQ8786 |
| Southerly | Devon | 50.67°N 04.09°W | SX5288 |
| Southernby | Cumbria | 54.74°N 02.99°W | NY3639 |
| Southern Cross | West Sussex | 50.83°N 00.22°W | TQ2505 |
| Southerndown | The Vale Of Glamorgan | 51.44°N 03.61°W | SS8873 |
| Southerness | Dumfries and Galloway | 54.87°N 03.60°W | NX9754 |
| Southerness Point | Dumfries and Galloway | 54.87°N 03.60°W | NX969549 |
| Southern Green | Hertfordshire | 51.96°N 00.09°W | TL3131 |
| Southerquoy | Orkney Islands | 59.03°N 03.34°W | HY2317 |
| South Erradale | Highland | 57.67°N 05.79°W | NG7471 |
| Southerton | Devon | 50.70°N 03.31°W | SY0790 |
| Southery | Norfolk | 52.52°N 00.38°E | TL6294 |
| Southey Green | Essex | 51.95°N 00.57°E | TL7732 |
| South Fambridge | Essex | 51.62°N 00.67°E | TQ8595 |
| South Farnborough | Hampshire | 51.27°N 00.75°W | SU8754 |
| South Fawley | Berkshire | 51.51°N 01.43°W | SU3980 |
| South Feorline | North Ayrshire | 55.50°N 05.32°W | NR9028 |
| South Ferriby | North Lincolnshire | 53.66°N 00.51°W | SE9820 |
| South Field | Berkshire | 51.49°N 00.63°W | SU9578 |
| South Field | East Riding of Yorkshire | 53.71°N 00.45°W | TA0225 |
| Southfield | Northumberland | 55.06°N 01.59°W | NZ2675 |
| Southfields | Essex | 51.50°N 00.39°E | TQ6681 |
| Southfields | Wandsworth | 51.44°N 00.20°W | TQ2573 |
| Southfleet | Kent | 51.41°N 00.31°E | TQ6171 |
| South Flobbets | Aberdeenshire | 57.39°N 02.35°W | NJ7934 |
| Southford | Isle of Wight | 50.59°N 01.28°W | SZ5178 |
| South Foreland | Kent | 51.13°N 01.36°E | TR358430 |

=== South G-South R ===
| Location | Locality | Coordinates (links to map & photo sources) | OS grid reference |
|---|---|---|---|
| South Garvan | Highland | 56.84°N 05.31°W | NM9877 |
| Southgate | Ceredigion | 52.39°N 04.07°W | SN5979 |
| Southgate | Cheshire | 53.32°N 02.70°W | SJ5381 |
| Southgate | Enfield | 51.63°N 00.12°W | TQ3094 |
| Southgate (King's Lynn and West Norfolk) | Norfolk | 52.87°N 00.76°E | TF8634 |
| Southgate (Broadland) | Norfolk | 52.77°N 01.17°E | TG1424 |
| Southgate | Swansea | 51.57°N 04.09°W | SS5588 |
| Southgate | West Sussex | 51.10°N 00.20°W | TQ2636 |
| South Glendale | Western Isles | 57.10°N 07.30°W | NF7914 |
| South Gluss | Shetland Islands | 60.47°N 01.38°W | HU3477 |
| South Godstone | Surrey | 51.21°N 00.05°W | TQ3648 |
| South Gorley | Hampshire | 50.88°N 01.77°W | SU1610 |
| South Gosforth | Newcastle upon Tyne | 54.99°N 01.62°W | NZ2467 |
| South Green (Fingringhoe) | Essex | 51.83°N 00.94°E | TM0319 |
| South Green (Great Burstead) | Essex | 51.61°N 00.42°E | TQ6893 |
| South Green | Kent | 51.30°N 00.63°E | TQ8460 |
| South Green (Mattishall) | Norfolk | 52.64°N 01.02°E | TG0510 |
| South Green (Terrington St Clement) | Norfolk | 52.74°N 00.28°E | TF5419 |
| South Green | Suffolk | 52.33°N 01.18°E | TM1775 |
| South Gyle | City of Edinburgh | 55.93°N 03.31°W | NT1872 |
| South-haa | Shetland Islands | 60.57°N 01.34°W | HU3688 |
| South Hackney | Hackney | 51.53°N 00.05°W | TQ3584 |
| South Ham | Hampshire | 51.25°N 01.12°W | SU6151 |
| South Hampstead | Camden | 51.54°N 00.18°W | TQ2684 |
| South Hanningfield | Essex | 51.64°N 00.51°E | TQ7497 |
| South Harefield | Hillingdon | 51.59°N 00.48°W | TQ0589 |
| South Harrow | Harrow | 51.56°N 00.37°W | TQ1386 |
| South Harting | West Sussex | 50.96°N 00.89°W | SU7819 |
| South Hatfield | Hertfordshire | 51.73°N 00.23°W | TL2206 |
| South Havra | Shetland Islands | 60.02°N 01.35°W | HU358268 |
| South Hayling | Hampshire | 50.78°N 00.97°W | SZ7299 |
| South Heath | Buckinghamshire | 51.70°N 00.68°W | SP9101 |
| South Heath | Essex | 51.83°N 01.06°E | TM1119 |
| South Heighton | East Sussex | 50.79°N 00.05°E | TQ4502 |
| South Hetton | Durham | 54.79°N 01.42°W | NZ3745 |
| South Hiendley | Wakefield | 53.60°N 01.41°W | SE3912 |
| South Hill | Cornwall | 50.52°N 04.37°W | SX3272 |
| South Hill | Pembrokeshire | 51.75°N 05.14°W | SM8311 |
| South Hill | Somerset | 51.29°N 02.94°W | ST3456 |
| South Hinksey | Oxfordshire | 51.73°N 01.27°W | SP5004 |
| South Hole | Devon | 50.95°N 04.53°W | SS2220 |
| South Holme | North Yorkshire | 54.18°N 00.94°W | SE6977 |
| South Holmwood | Surrey | 51.19°N 00.32°W | TQ1745 |
| South Hornchurch | Havering | 51.52°N 00.17°E | TQ5183 |
| South Huish | Devon | 50.25°N 03.83°W | SX6941 |
| South Hykeham | Lincolnshire | 53.16°N 00.61°W | SK9364 |
| South Hylton | Sunderland | 54.89°N 01.45°W | NZ3556 |
| Southill | Bedfordshire | 52.06°N 00.32°W | TL1542 |
| Southill | Dorset | 50.61°N 02.48°W | SY6680 |
| Southington | Hampshire | 51.23°N 01.28°W | SU5049 |
| South Isle of Gletness | Shetland Islands | 60.23°N 01.15°W | HU470507 |
| South Kelsey | Lincolnshire | 53.46°N 00.43°W | TF0498 |
| South Kensington | Royal Borough of Kensington and Chelsea | 51.48°N 00.18°W | TQ2678 |
| South Kessock | Highland | 57.48°N 04.25°W | NH6546 |
| South Killingholme | North Lincolnshire | 53.62°N 00.27°W | TA1416 |
| South Kilvington | North Yorkshire | 54.25°N 01.35°W | SE4284 |
| South Kilworth | Leicestershire | 52.42°N 01.11°W | SP6081 |
| South Kingennie | Angus | 56.50°N 02.86°W | NO4735 |
| South Kirkby | Wakefield | 53.58°N 01.33°W | SE4410 |
| South Kirkton | Aberdeenshire | 57.13°N 02.44°W | NJ7305 |
| South Kiscadale | North Ayrshire | 55.47°N 05.10°W | NS0425 |
| South Knighton | Devon | 50.53°N 03.68°W | SX8172 |
| South Knighton | City of Leicester | 52.60°N 01.11°W | SK6001 |
| South Kyme | Lincolnshire | 53.02°N 00.25°W | TF1749 |
| South Lambeth | Lambeth | 51.46°N 00.12°W | TQ3076 |
| South Lancing | West Sussex | 50.82°N 00.32°W | TQ1804 |
| Southlands | Dorset | 50.59°N 02.46°W | SY6777 |
| South Lane | Barnsley | 53.55°N 01.60°W | SE2606 |
| Southleigh | Devon | 50.73°N 03.13°W | SY2093 |
| South Leigh | Oxfordshire | 51.76°N 01.43°W | SP3908 |
| South Leverton | Nottinghamshire | 53.31°N 00.83°W | SK7880 |
| South Littleton | Worcestershire | 52.11°N 01.89°W | SP0746 |
| South Lochboisdale | Western Isles | 57.13°N 07.34°W | NF7717 |
| South Lopham | Norfolk | 52.38°N 00.99°E | TM0481 |
| South Luffenham | Rutland | 52.59°N 00.61°W | SK9401 |
| South Malling | East Sussex | 50.88°N 00.00°E | TQ4111 |
| Southmarsh | Somerset | 51.06°N 02.38°W | ST7330 |
| South Marston | Swindon | 51.59°N 01.72°W | SU1988 |
| Southmead | City of Bristol | 51.49°N 02.60°W | ST5878 |
| South Merstham | Surrey | 51.25°N 00.15°W | TQ2952 |
| South Middleton | Northumberland | 55.50°N 02.01°W | NT9923 |
| South Milford | North Yorkshire | 53.77°N 01.25°W | SE4931 |
| South Milton | Devon | 50.26°N 03.83°W | SX6942 |
| South Mimms | Hertfordshire | 51.69°N 00.23°W | TL2201 |
| Southminster | Essex | 51.65°N 00.81°E | TQ9599 |
| South Molton | Devon | 51.01°N 03.84°W | SS7125 |
| Southmoor | Oxfordshire | 51.67°N 01.43°W | SU3998 |
| South Moor | Durham | 54.85°N 01.72°W | NZ1851 |
| South Moreton | Oxfordshire | 51.58°N 01.19°W | SU5688 |
| Southmuir | Angus | 56.66°N 03.02°W | NO3753 |
| South Mundham | West Sussex | 50.79°N 00.76°W | SU8700 |
| South Muskham | Nottinghamshire | 53.10°N 00.82°W | SK7957 |
| South Ness | Shetland Islands | 60.11°N 02.06°W | HT963363 |
| South Newbald | East Riding of Yorkshire | 53.80°N 00.61°W | SE9135 |
| South Newbarns | Cumbria | 54.11°N 03.21°W | SD2169 |
| South Newington | Oxfordshire | 51.99°N 01.41°W | SP4033 |
| South Newsham | Northumberland | 55.09°N 01.53°W | NZ3078 |
| South Newton | Wiltshire | 51.10°N 01.88°W | SU0834 |
| South Normanton | Derbyshire | 53.09°N 01.34°W | SK4456 |
| South Norwood | Croydon | 51.39°N 00.08°W | TQ3368 |
| South Nutfield | Surrey | 51.22°N 00.13°W | TQ3049 |
| South Ockendon | Essex | 51.50°N 00.27°E | TQ5881 |
| Southoe | Cambridgeshire | 52.26°N 00.27°W | TL1864 |
| Southolt | Suffolk | 52.26°N 01.20°E | TM1968 |
| South Ormsby | Lincolnshire | 53.25°N 00.05°E | TF3775 |
| Southorpe | Cambridgeshire | 52.61°N 00.40°W | TF0803 |
| South Ossett | Wakefield | 53.66°N 01.57°W | SE2819 |
| South Otterington | North Yorkshire | 54.27°N 01.43°W | SE3787 |
| Southover (Burton Bradstock) | Dorset | 50.69°N 02.73°W | SY4889 |
| Southover (Frampton) | Dorset | 50.74°N 02.54°W | SY6294 |
| Southover (Burwash) | East Sussex | 51.00°N 00.35°E | TQ6525 |
| Southover (Lewes) | East Sussex | 50.86°N 00.00°E | TQ4109 |
| South Owersby | Lincolnshire | 53.42°N 00.40°W | TF0693 |
| Southowram | Calderdale | 53.70°N 01.83°W | SE1123 |
| South Oxhey | Hertfordshire | 51.61°N 00.39°W | TQ1192 |
| South Parks | Fife | 56.19°N 03.19°W | NO2601 |
| South Pelaw | Durham | 54.86°N 01.59°W | NZ2652 |
| South Perrott | Dorset | 50.85°N 02.75°W | ST4706 |
| South Petherton | Somerset | 50.94°N 02.81°W | ST4316 |
| South Petherwin | Cornwall | 50.60°N 04.40°W | SX3081 |
| South Pickenham | Norfolk | 52.60°N 00.73°E | TF8504 |
| South Pill | Cornwall | 50.40°N 04.22°W | SX4259 |
| South Pool | Devon | 50.24°N 03.72°W | SX7740 |
| South Poorton | Dorset | 50.77°N 02.69°W | SY5197 |
| Southport | Sefton | 53.64°N 02.99°W | SD3417 |
| South Powrie | City of Dundee | 56.49°N 02.94°W | NO4234 |
| Southpunds | Shetland Islands | 59.96°N 01.28°W | HU4020 |
| South Quilquox | Aberdeenshire | 57.42°N 02.18°W | NJ8937 |
| South Radworthy | Devon | 51.07°N 03.80°W | SS7432 |
| South Rauceby | Lincolnshire | 52.99°N 00.48°W | TF0245 |
| South Raynham | Norfolk | 52.78°N 00.77°E | TF8724 |
| South Reddish | Stockport | 53.42°N 02.16°W | SJ8992 |
| Southrepps | Norfolk | 52.87°N 01.34°E | TG2536 |
| South Reston | Lincolnshire | 53.32°N 00.10°E | TF4083 |
| Southrey | Lincolnshire | 53.17°N 00.31°W | TF1366 |
| South Ronaldsay | Orkney Islands | 58.77°N 02.95°W | ND446883 |
| Southrop | Gloucestershire | 51.72°N 01.71°W | SP2003 |
| Southrop | Oxfordshire | 51.98°N 01.49°W | SP3532 |
| Southrope | Hampshire | 51.19°N 01.04°W | SU6744 |
| South Ruislip | Hillingdon | 51.55°N 00.40°W | TQ1185 |
| South Runcton | Norfolk | 52.64°N 00.40°E | TF6308 |

=== South S-South Z ===
| Location | Locality | Coordinates (links to map & photo sources) | OS grid reference |
|---|---|---|---|
| South Scarle | Nottinghamshire | 53.16°N 00.74°W | SK8464 |
| South Scousburgh | Shetland Islands | 59.93°N 01.33°W | HU3717 |
| Southsea | City of Portsmouth | 50.78°N 01.09°W | SZ6499 |
| Southsea | Wrexham | 53.05°N 03.04°W | SJ3051 |
| South Shian | Argyll and Bute | 56.51°N 05.41°W | NM9041 |
| South Shields | South Tyneside | 54.98°N 01.43°W | NZ3666 |
| South Shore | Lancashire | 53.78°N 03.06°W | SD3033 |
| Southside | Orkney Islands | 59.14°N 02.77°W | HY5629 |
| South Side | Durham | 54.62°N 01.84°W | NZ1026 |
| South Somercotes | Lincolnshire | 53.41°N 00.12°E | TF4193 |
| South Stainley | North Yorkshire | 54.06°N 01.54°W | SE3063 |
| South Stainmore | Cumbria | 54.51°N 02.24°W | NY8413 |
| South Stanley | Durham | 54.86°N 01.70°W | NZ1952 |
| South Stifford | Essex | 51.47°N 00.28°E | TQ5978 |
| South Stoke | Oxfordshire | 51.54°N 01.15°W | SU5983 |
| South Stoke | West Sussex | 50.87°N 00.55°W | TQ0209 |
| South Stoke | Bath and North East Somerset | 51.34°N 02.37°W | ST7461 |
| South Stour | Kent | 51.10°N 00.89°E | TR0338 |
| South Straiton | Fife | 56.38°N 02.95°W | NO4122 |
| South Street | Bromley | 51.29°N 00.04°E | TQ4357 |
| South Street | East Sussex | 50.94°N 00.02°W | TQ3918 |
| South Street (Meopham) | Kent | 51.34°N 00.33°E | TQ6363 |
| South Street (Stockbury) | Kent | 51.31°N 00.62°E | TQ8361 |
| South Street (Whitstable) | Kent | 51.34°N 01.04°E | TR1265 |
| South Street (Boughton under Blean) | Kent | 51.27°N 00.93°E | TR0557 |
| South Tawton | Devon | 50.73°N 03.91°W | SX6594 |
| South Tehidy | Cornwall | 50.23°N 05.29°W | SW6542 |
| South Thoresby | Lincolnshire | 53.26°N 00.09°E | TF4076 |
| South Tidworth | Wiltshire | 51.23°N 01.67°W | SU2348 |
| South Tottenham | Hackney | 51.57°N 00.08°W | TQ3388 |
| South Town | Devon | 50.63°N 03.47°W | SX9683 |
| South Town | Hampshire | 51.11°N 01.07°W | SU6536 |
| Southtown | Norfolk | 52.59°N 01.71°E | TG5206 |
| Southtown (West Pennard) | Somerset | 51.13°N 02.64°W | ST5538 |
| Southtown (Ashill) | Somerset | 50.93°N 02.96°W | ST3216 |
| South Twerton | Bath and North East Somerset | 51.37°N 02.38°W | ST7364 |
| South Uist | Western Isles | 57.27°N 07.29°W | NF811323 |
| South Ulverston | Cumbria | 54.19°N 03.07°W | SD3078 |
| South View | Hampshire | 51.26°N 01.09°W | SU6352 |
| Southville | Devon | 50.27°N 03.76°W | SX7443 |
| Southville | Torfaen | 51.64°N 03.02°W | ST2995 |
| Southwaite | Cumbria | 54.78°N 02.85°W | NY4544 |
| South Walls | Orkney Islands | 58.79°N 03.18°W | ND316899 |
| South Walsham | Norfolk | 52.66°N 01.48°E | TG3613 |
| South Wamses | Northumberland | 55.63°N 01.63°W | NU233377 |
| Southwark | Southwark | 51.50°N 00.09°W | TQ3279 |
| South Warnborough | Hampshire | 51.21°N 00.97°W | SU7247 |
| Southwater | West Sussex | 51.02°N 00.36°W | TQ1526 |
| Southwater Street | West Sussex | 51.03°N 00.36°W | TQ1527 |
| Southway | Devon | 50.42°N 04.14°W | SX4860 |
| Southway | Somerset | 51.17°N 02.70°W | ST5142 |
| South Weald | Essex | 51.61°N 00.26°E | TQ5793 |
| South Weirs | Hampshire | 50.80°N 01.60°W | SU2801 |
| Southwell | Dorset | 50.52°N 02.45°W | SY6870 |
| Southwell | Nottinghamshire | 53.07°N 00.95°W | SK7053 |
| South Weston | Oxfordshire | 51.67°N 00.98°W | SU7098 |
| South West Point | Devon | 51.15°N 04.66°W | SS136434 |
| South Wheatley | Cornwall | 50.70°N 04.49°W | SX2492 |
| South Wheatley | Nottinghamshire | 53.35°N 00.85°W | SK7685 |
| Southwick | Hampshire | 50.86°N 01.12°W | SU6208 |
| Southwick | Northamptonshire | 52.51°N 00.51°W | TL0192 |
| Southwick | Somerset | 51.20°N 02.93°W | ST3546 |
| Southwick | Sunderland | 54.91°N 01.42°W | NZ3758 |
| Southwick | West Sussex | 50.83°N 00.24°W | TQ2405 |
| Southwick | Wiltshire | 51.29°N 02.24°W | ST8355 |
| South Widcombe | Bath and North East Somerset | 51.30°N 02.60°W | ST5856 |
| South Wigston | Leicestershire | 52.57°N 01.13°W | SP5998 |
| South Willesborough | Kent | 51.12°N 00.88°E | TR0240 |
| South Willingham | Lincolnshire | 53.33°N 00.21°W | TF1983 |
| South Wimbledon | Merton | 51.41°N 00.20°W | TQ2570 |
| South Wingate | Durham | 54.69°N 01.36°W | NZ4134 |
| South Wingfield | Derbyshire | 53.09°N 01.44°W | SK3755 |
| South Witham | Lincolnshire | 52.76°N 00.63°W | SK9219 |
| Southwold | Suffolk | 52.32°N 01.66°E | TM5076 |
| South Wonford | Devon | 50.84°N 04.30°W | SS3808 |
| South Wonston | Hampshire | 51.11°N 01.34°W | SU4635 |
| Southwood | Derbyshire | 52.78°N 01.48°W | SK3521 |
| Southwood | Hampshire | 51.28°N 00.79°W | SU8455 |
| Southwood | Norfolk | 52.59°N 01.52°E | TG3905 |
| Southwood | Somerset | 51.09°N 02.64°W | ST5533 |
| Southwood | Worcestershire | 52.25°N 02.38°W | SO7462 |
| South Woodford | Redbridge | 51.59°N 00.01°E | TQ4090 |
| South Woodham Ferrers | Essex | 51.64°N 00.60°E | TQ8097 |
| South Wootton | Norfolk | 52.77°N 00.42°E | TF6422 |
| South Wraxall | Wiltshire | 51.37°N 02.24°W | ST8364 |
| South Yardley | Birmingham | 52.45°N 01.82°W | SP1284 |
| South Yeo | Devon | 50.78°N 04.11°W | SS5100 |
| South Zeal | Devon | 50.72°N 03.91°W | SX6593 |
