= South End =

South End, South-end or Southend may refer to:

== Places ==
=== Australia ===
- Southend, Queensland, a small township on Curtis Island
- Southend, South Australia, a town and locality

=== Canada ===
- South End, Halifax, Nova Scotia, a neighbourhood
- South End, a neighbourhood in Yarmouth, Nova Scotia
- Southend, Saskatchewan, a community

=== United Kingdom ===
==== England ====
- Southend-on-Sea, Essex, a city
  - London Southend Airport
  - Southend (UK Parliament constituency)
  - Southend-on-Sea City Council
- South End, Bedfordshire, a location
- Southend, Berkshire, in Bradfield
- Southend, Brightwalton, a location in Berkshire
- Southend, Buckinghamshire, in Turville
- South End, Buckinghamshire, in Stewkley
- South End, Cumbria, a location
- South End, East Riding of Yorkshire, a location
- Southend, Gloucestershire, a location
- South End, Hampshire, a location
- South-end, Hertfordshire, a settlement in the parish of Much Hadham in England
- South End, Lincolnshire, a location
- South End, Norfolk, a location
- Southend, Oxfordshire, a location

===== London =====
- Southend, London, in Lewisham
- South End, Greenwich, a location, southeast of Eltham, in southeast London
- South End (road), a road in South Croydon, London
- South End Road, a road in Hampstead, London

==== Scotland ====
- Southend, Argyll, Argyll and Bute

=== United States ===
- South End, Agoura Hills, California, a neighborhood
- South End, a neighborhood in Hartford, Connecticut
- South End of Stamford, Connecticut
- South End, Boston, Massachusetts, a neighborhood
  - South End Grounds, three baseball parks within this neighborhood
- South End, Springfield, Massachusetts, an Italian neighborhood
- South End, Minnesota, a census-designated place
- South End, a neighborhood of Albany, New York
- South End (Charlotte neighborhood), North Carolina
- South End, Seattle, Washington state

== Other uses ==
- Southend (band)
- The South End, the student newspaper of Wayne State University
- Southend Interactive, a video game developer most noted for Deathrow
- South End Press, a non-profit book publisher
- South End Reservoir, a service reservoir for Singapore Changi Airport
- South End Rowing Club

== See also ==
- Southend Manor F.C.
- Southend United F.C.
- Southend-on-Sea (disambiguation)
- South (disambiguation)
