= Southorpe Meadow =

Nature reserve in Cambridgeshire, England

Coordinates: 52.615°N 0.402°W

- Site of Special Scientific Interest
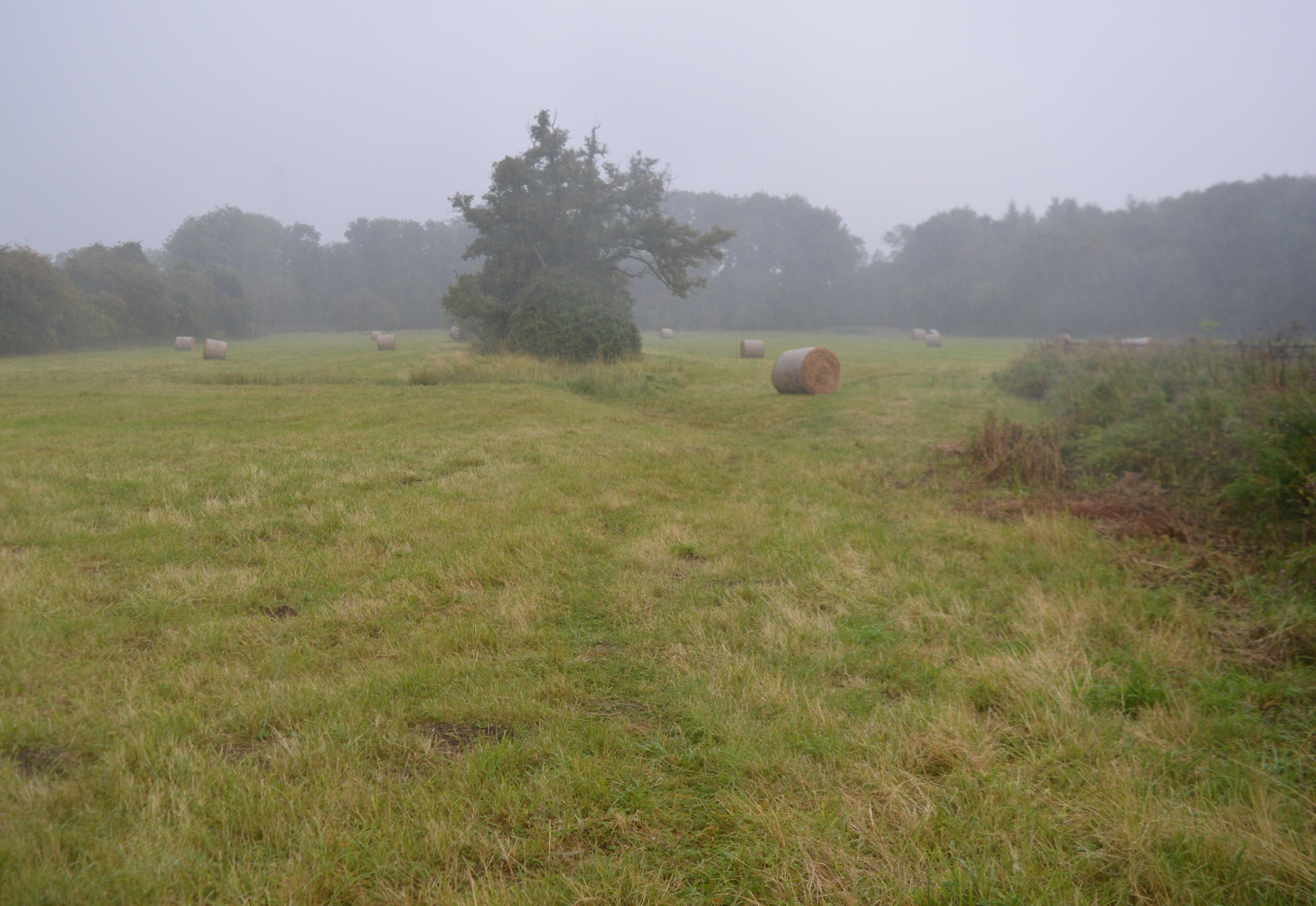
- Location of Southorpe Meadow.
- Area of search: Cambridgeshire
- Grid reference: TF 083 031
- Interest: Biological
- Area: 2.0 hectares (4.9 acres)
- Notification date: 1983
- Location map: Magic Map

Southorpe Meadow is a 2 hectares (4.9 acres) biological Site of Special Scientific Interest in Southorpe in Cambridgeshire. It is managed by the Wildlife Trust for Bedfordshire, Cambridgeshire and Northamptonshire.

This is one of the few surviving areas of neutral grassland in the county, where ridge and furrow from medieval ploughing can be seen. There is a rich variety of species, such as red fescue in drier areas, and salad burnet in damper ones.

There is access from Main Street.
