= Southwood Camp =

- Southwood, Hampshire
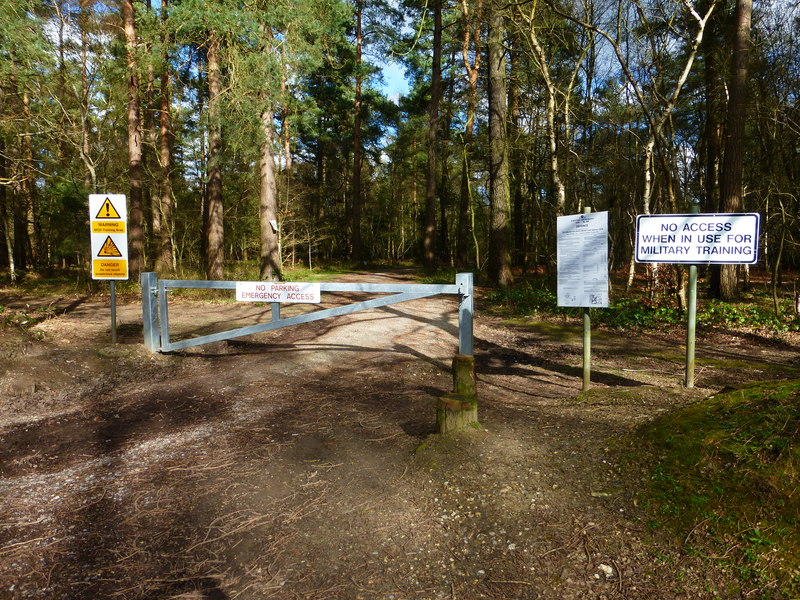
- The military training area to the immediate west of the former camp

Site information
- Type: Barracks
- Owner: Ministry of Defence
- Operator: British Army

Location
- Location within Hampshire
- Coordinates: 51.2904°N 0.7890°W

Site history
- Built: 1939
- Built for: War Office
- In use: 1939–c.1979

Southwood Camp was a military installation at Southwood in Hampshire.

== History ==
The camp was completed in 1939 and was used by Canadian signals and engineer units during the Second World War. It became a home for Royal Engineers training regiments after the war and, as consolidation of those regiments took place in 1959, it served as the home of 1 Training Regiment Royal Engineers in the 1960s and early 1970s. After the training units transferred to modern facilities at Gibraltar Barracks, Southwood Camp closed mid-1979. Although the military training area still exists, the site is now largely occupied by a modern housing estate which was built in the 1980s.
