= Listed buildings in South Holme =

South Holme is a civil parish in the county of North Yorkshire, England. It contains three listed buildings that are recorded in the National Heritage List for England. All the listed buildings are designated at Grade II, the lowest of the three grades, which is applied to "buildings of national importance and special interest". The parish contains the settlement of South Holme and the surrounding countryside, and the listed buildings consist of two farmhouses and a bridge.

== Buildings ==
Name and location	Photograph	Date	Notes
West Farmhouse; 54.18841°N 0.92789°W	—	17th century	The farmhouse is in limestone, and has a pantile roof with gable coping and shaped kneelers. There are two storeys and four bays. On the front is a doorway, with a casement window to the left and two sash windows to the right, The upper floor contains sash windows, some horizontally sliding. Inside, there is an inglenook fireplace.
East Ness Bridge; 54.19470°N 0.93460°W		18th century	The bridge carries Railway Street over Holbeck. It is in limestone, and consists of three stepped segmental arches, with voussoirs, a band and a coped parapet.
Manor Farmhouse; 54.18774°N 0.92906°W	—	Mid to late 18th century	The farmhouse is in limestone, and has a pantile roof with gable coping and shaped kneelers. There are two ranges, the right lower, and rear outshuts. The right range contains a doorway with a divided fanlight, a central tripartite sash window, and paired sashes under segmental arches. On the upper floor are a blocked window, and casements under segmental arches. The left range has a blocked doorway and sash windows, those in the upper floor horizontally sliding.
