= Southorpe Roughs =

Protected area in Cambridgeshire, England

Coordinates: 52.615°N 0.417°W

- Site of Special Scientific Interest
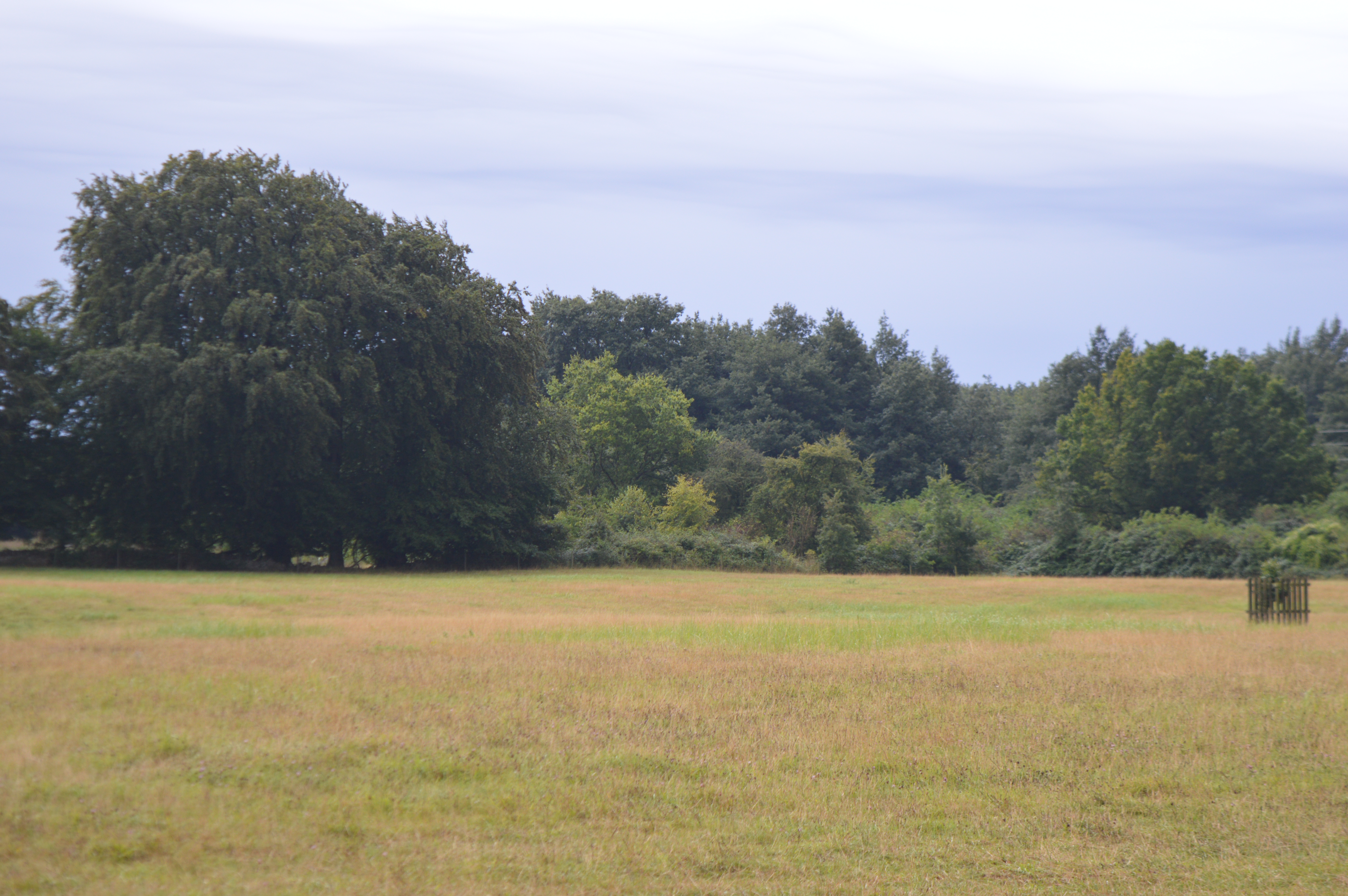
- Location of Southorpe Roughs.
- Area of search: Cambridgeshire
- Grid reference: TF 073 031
- Interest: Biological
- Area: 9.8 hectares
- Notification date: 1986
- Location map: Magic Map

Southorpe Roughs is a 9.8-hectare (24-acre) Site of Special Scientific Interest west of Southorpe in Cambridgeshire.

This is a disused quarry which has grassland on Jurassic limestone. The main grasses are tor-grass and sheep's fescue, and there are the nationally rare plants spotted cat's ear and pasque flower.

The site is private land with no public access.
