= Southend-on-Sea (disambiguation) =

Southend-on-Sea is a city and unitary authority in Essex, England, UK.

Southend-on-Sea may also refer to:

== Places ==
- Southend on Sea Foreshore, Southend-on-Sea, Essex, England, UK
- Southend-on-Sea City Council, Southend-on-Sea, Essex, England, UK
- Southend-on-Sea (UK Parliament constituency), Essex, England, UK

== Other uses ==
- Southend-on-Sea Athletic Club, Essex, England, UK
- Southend-on-Sea Lifeboat Station, Southend-on-Sea, Essex, England, UK

== See also ==
- Southend-on-Sea Borough Council elections, Southend-on-Sea, Essex, England, UK
- Southend-on-Sea Corporation Tramways, Southend-on-Sea, Essex, England, UK
- Category:Southend-on-Sea (disambiguation)
- Southend (disambiguation)
- Sea (disambiguation)
