= Southorpe Paddock =

Nature reserve in Cambridgeshire, England

Coordinates: 52.606°N 0.401°W

- Site of Special Scientific Interest
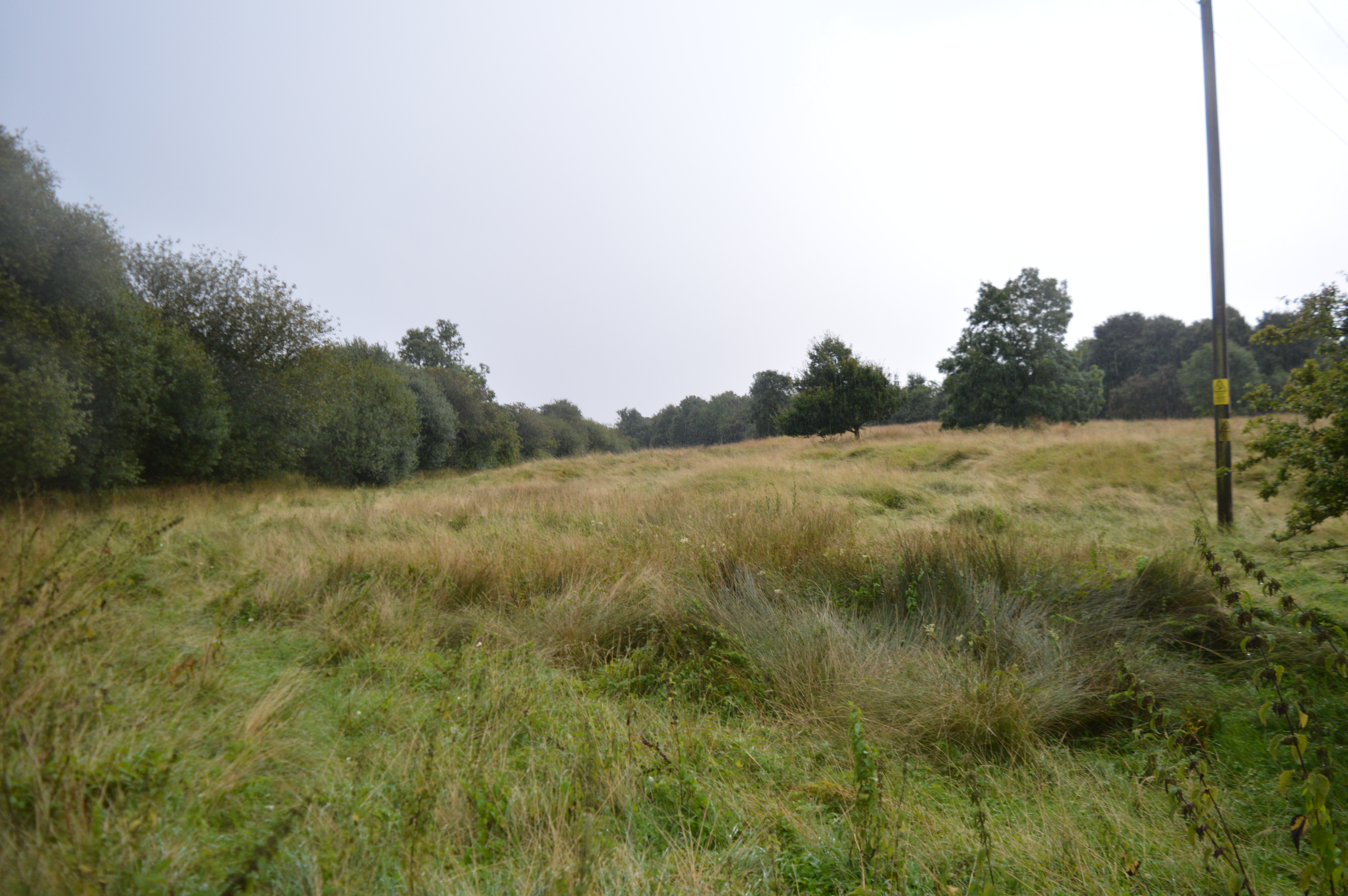
- Location of Southorpe Paddock.
- Area of search: Cambridgeshire
- Grid reference: TF 084 021
- Interest: Biological
- Area: 1.6 hectares
- Notification date: 1986
- Location map: Magic Map

Southorpe Paddock is a 1.6-hectare (4.0-acre) Site of Special Scientific Interest south of Southorpe in Cambridgeshire. It is managed by the Wildlife Trust for Bedfordshire, Cambridgeshire and Northamptonshire.

This site is a rare example of unimproved grassland on the Jurassic limestone of eastern England. It has typical limestone plants such as purple milk-vetch and clustered bellflower. Mature hedgerows provide additional habitats for wildlife.

There is access from the road south from Southorpe.
