= Southerness Lighthouse =

Southerness lighthouse
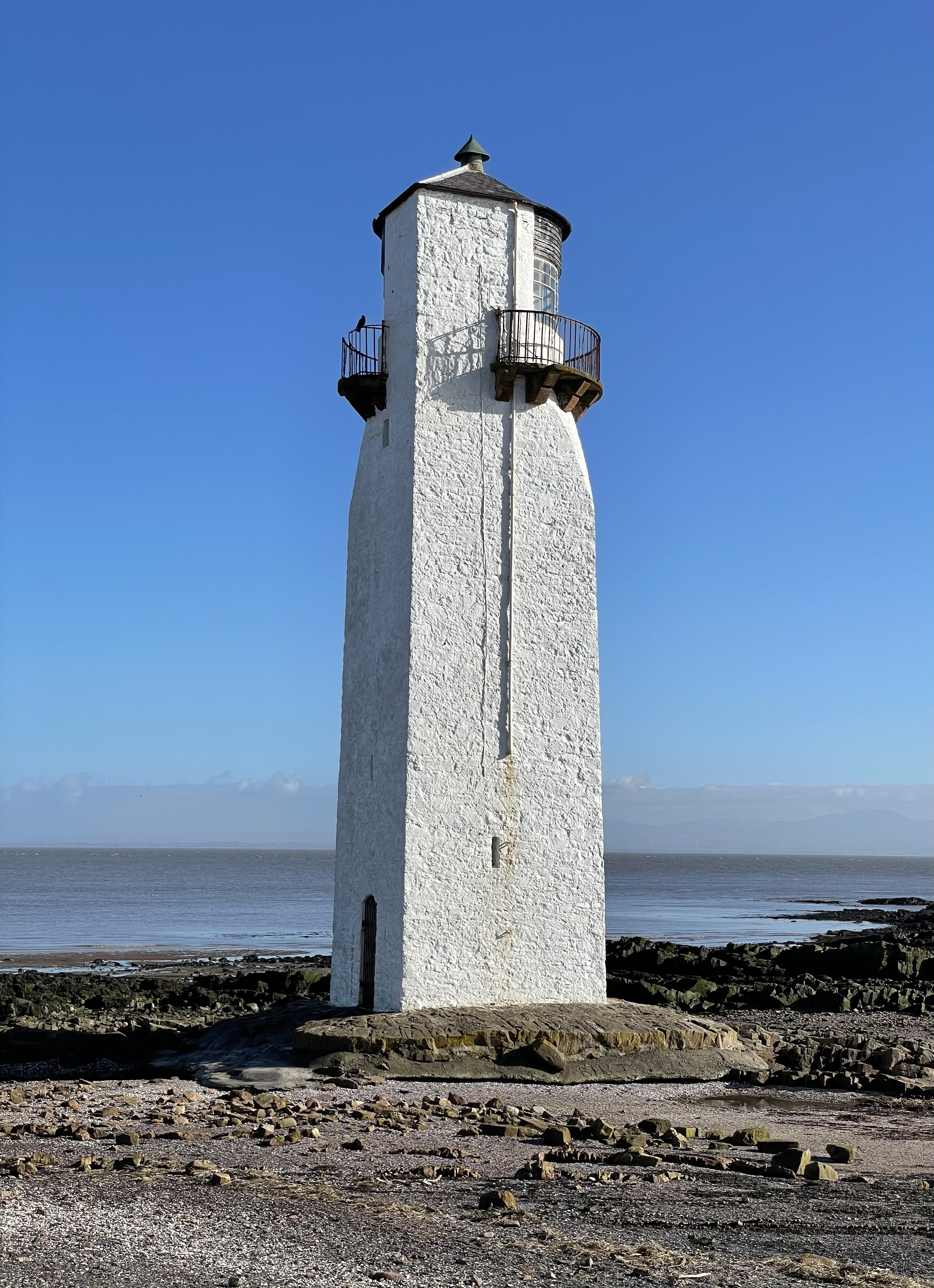
- Location: Southerness, Dumfries and Galloway, Scotland
- OS grid: NX9774554282
- Coordinates: 54°52′20″N 3°35′36″W

Tower
- Constructed: 1749
- Height: 17 metres
- Shape: Square
- Markings: White
- Heritage: category A listed building

Light
- First lit: 1800 (approximately)
- Deactivated: 1931
- Focal height: 17 m (56 ft)

Southerness Lighthouse is located at the village of Southerness in South West Scotland. It is at present the second oldest lighthouse in Scotland. The lighthouse was commissioned by the Town Council of Dumfries in 1748 to assist in the safe passage through the Solway Firth of ships heading to the Nith Estuary. At that time roads in South West Scotland were quite sparse so the bulk of trade even between local villages, was carried out by sea. Dumfries was a major port and there were regular connections with Liverpool and, especially, Ireland. Construction was completed in 1749.

In 1805 the lighthouse was greatly improved under the guidance of the famous lighthouse engineer Robert Stevenson assisted by James Slight.

The lighthouse was raised from its original structure twice, most notably between 1842 and 1844 to a design by Walter Newall.

The lighthouse was first lit around 1800 and was decommissioned in 1936. The light was extinguished due to financial reasons between 1867 and 1894. In 1894 it was restored at the expense of a local benefactress, Georgiana Blackett of Arbigland.

== Gallery ==
Southerness Lighthouse

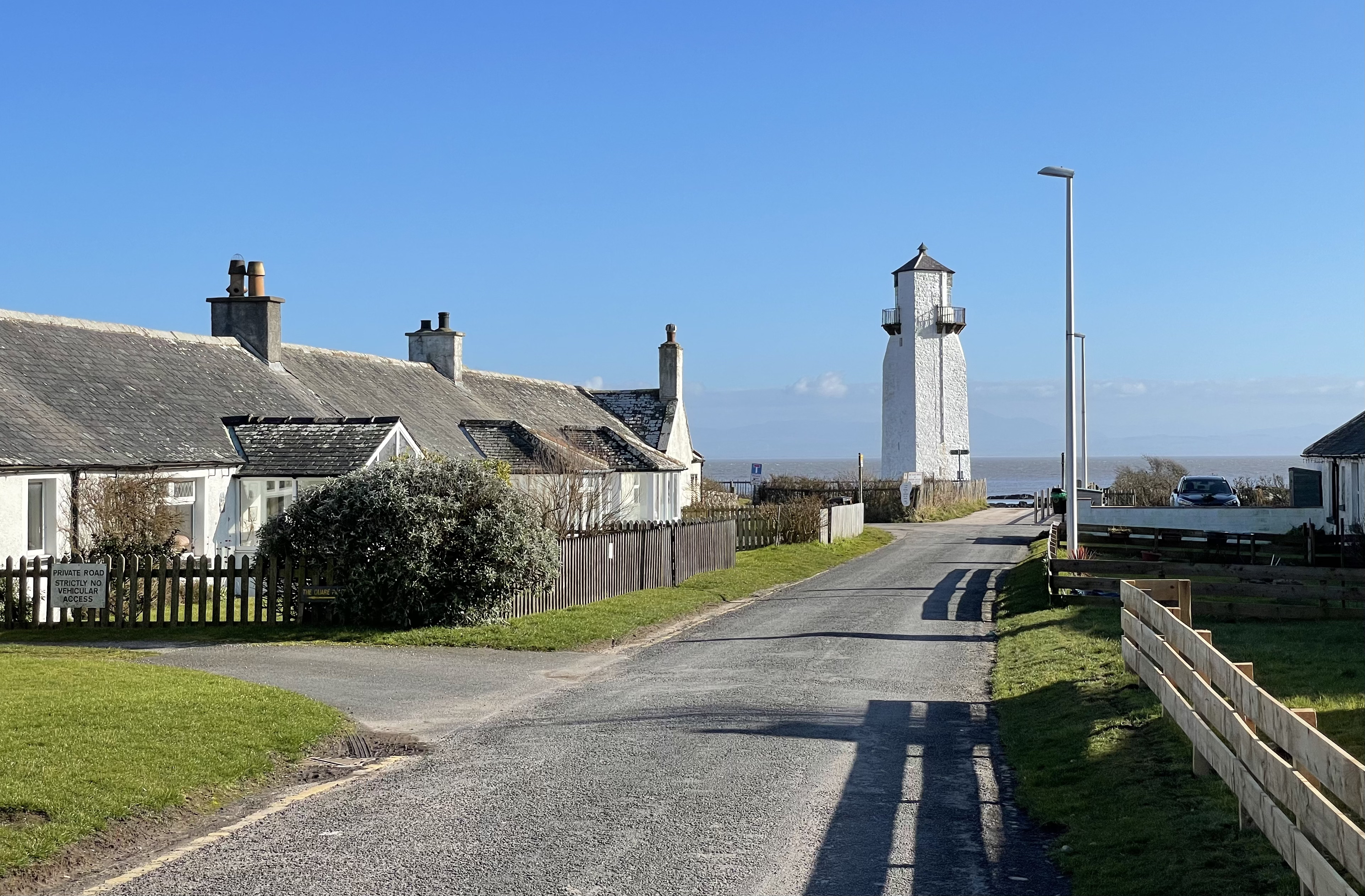
Lighthouse seen from the village.

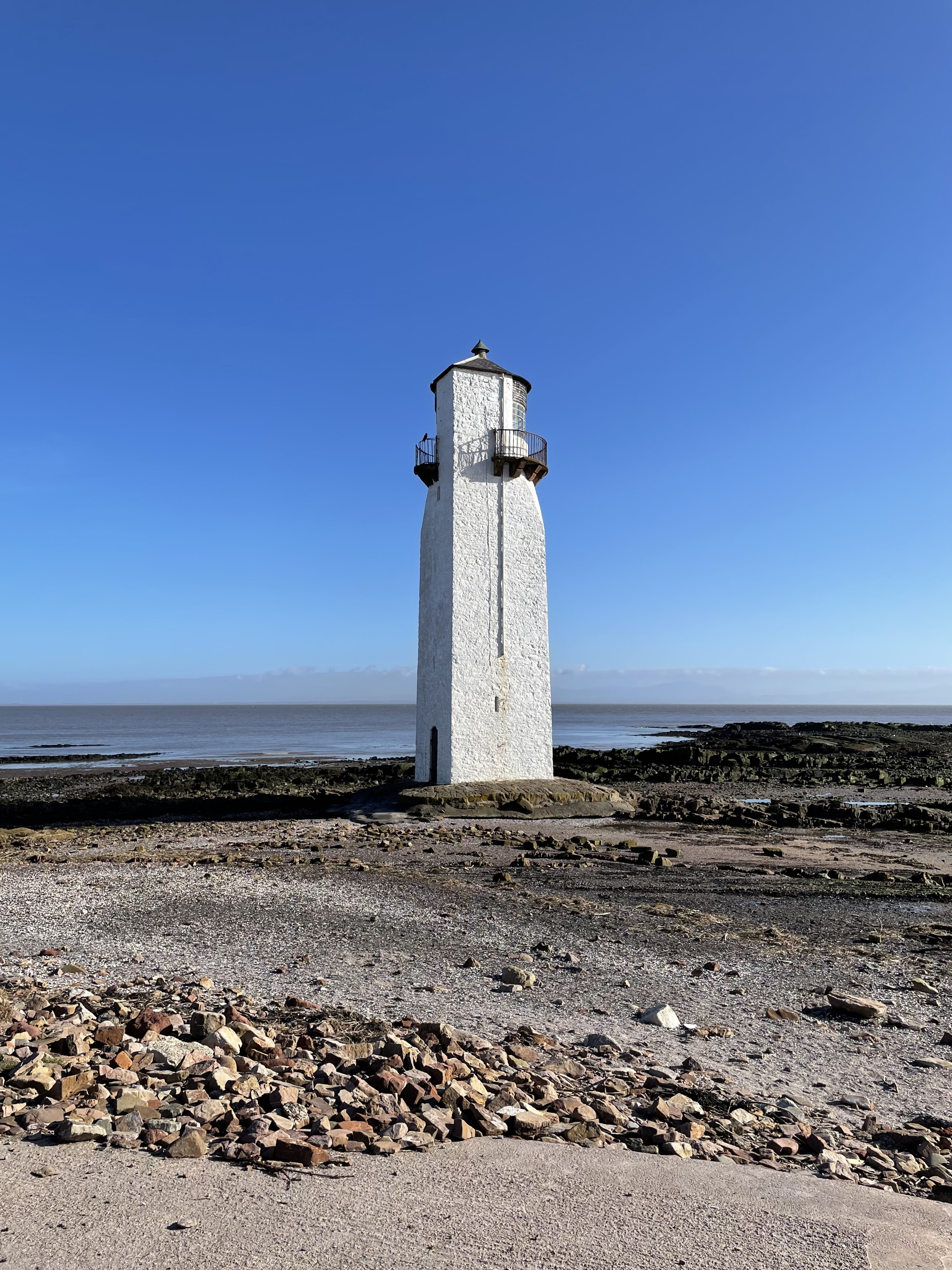
Lighthouse from the path.

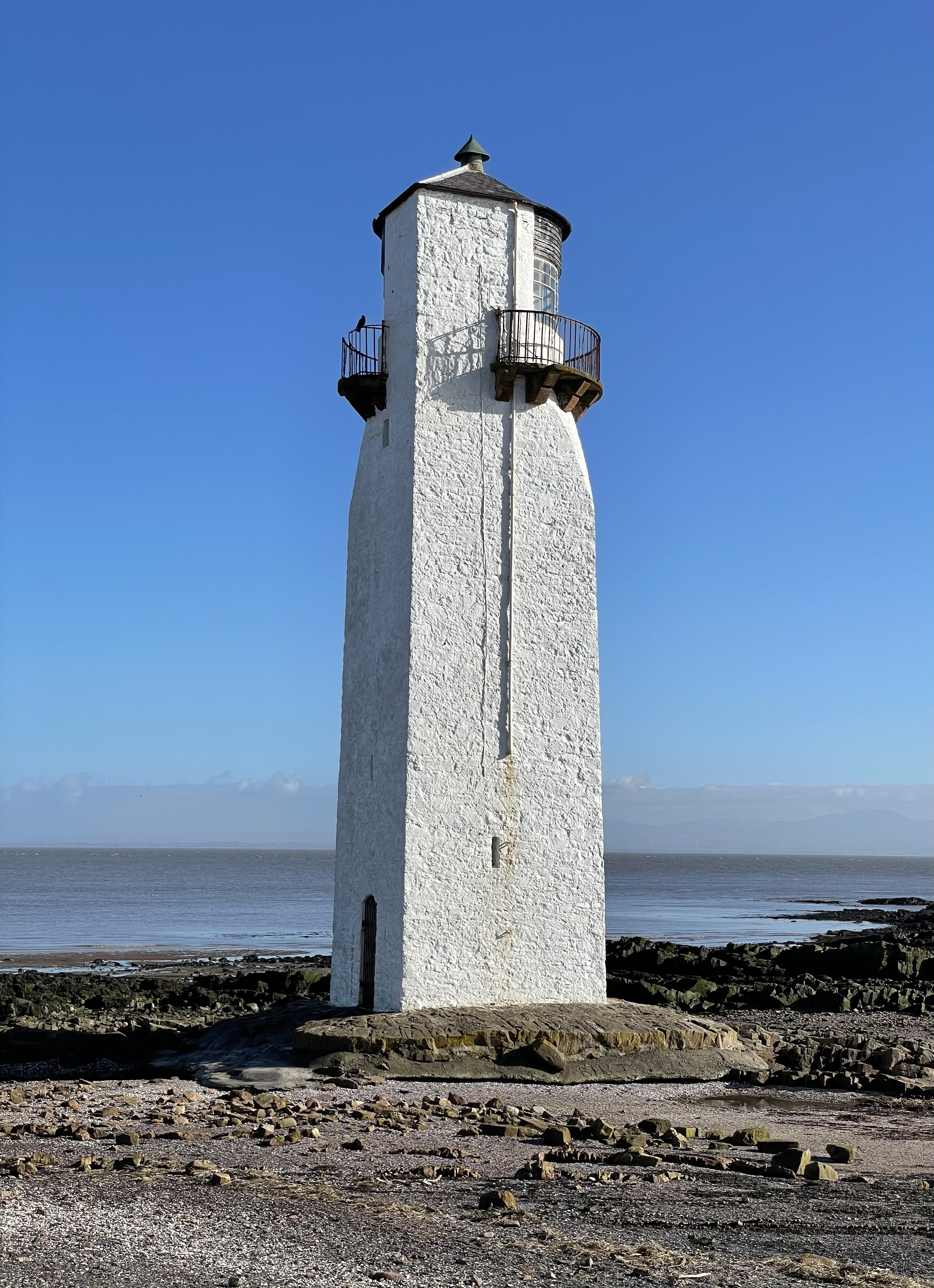

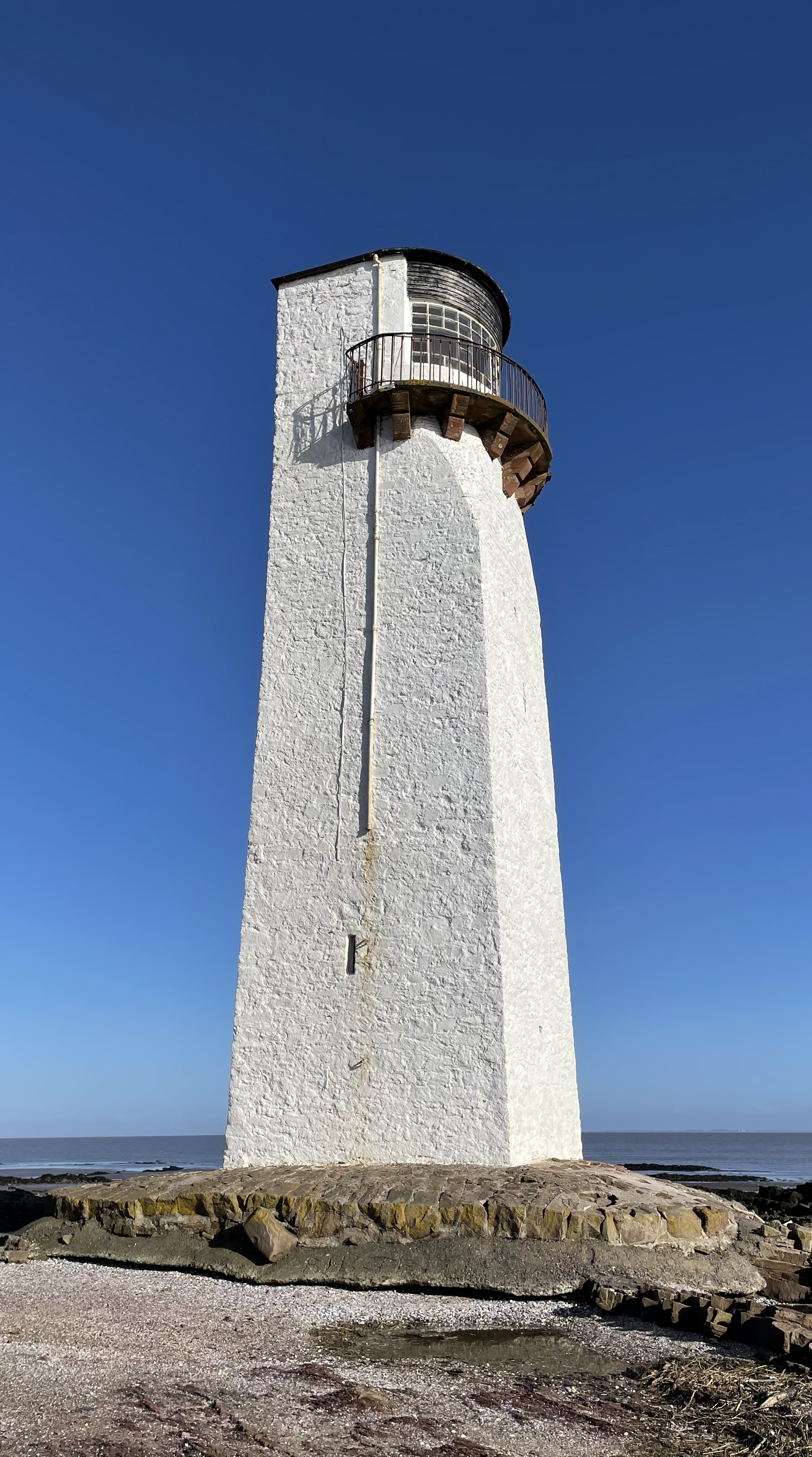

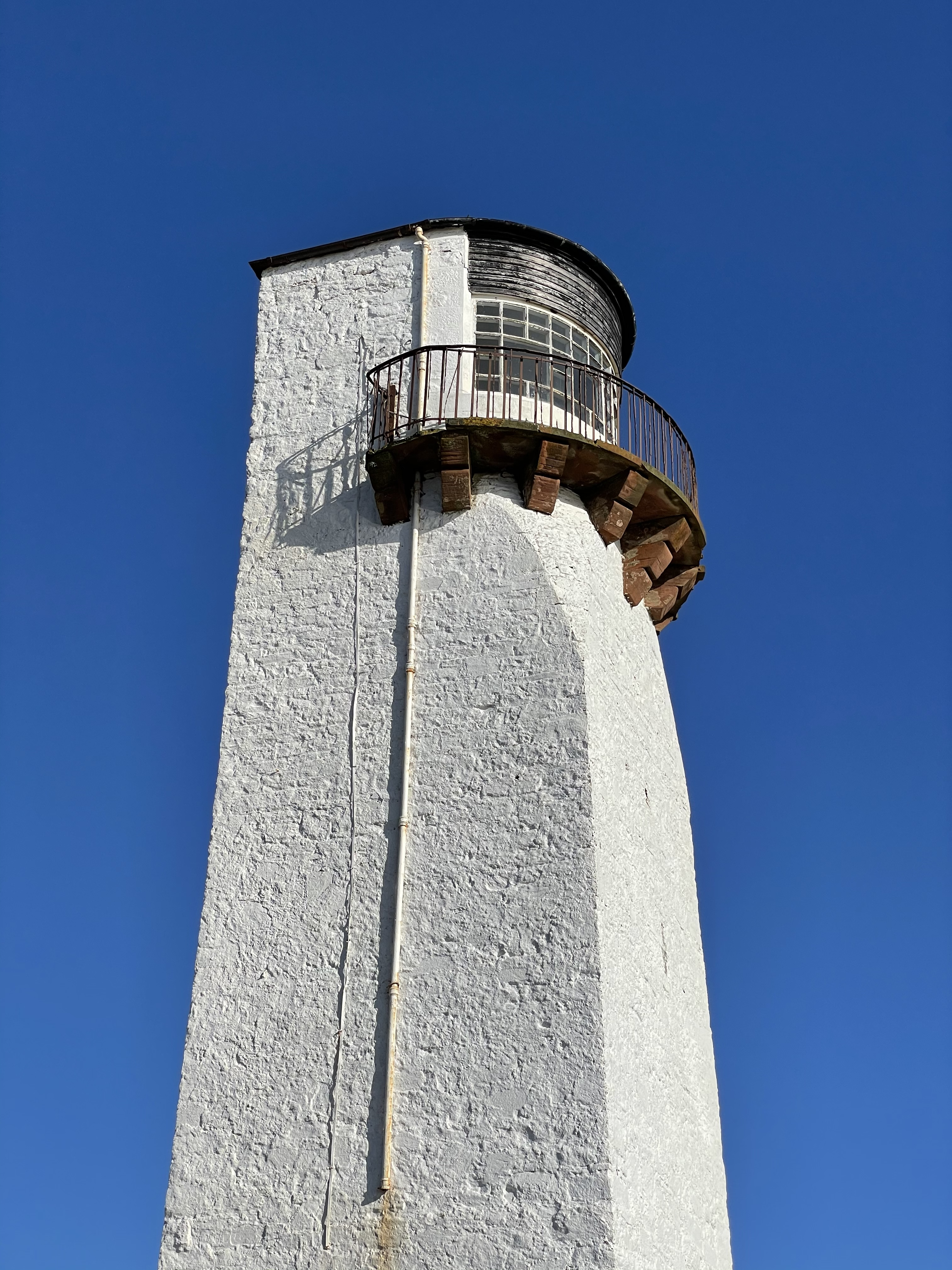

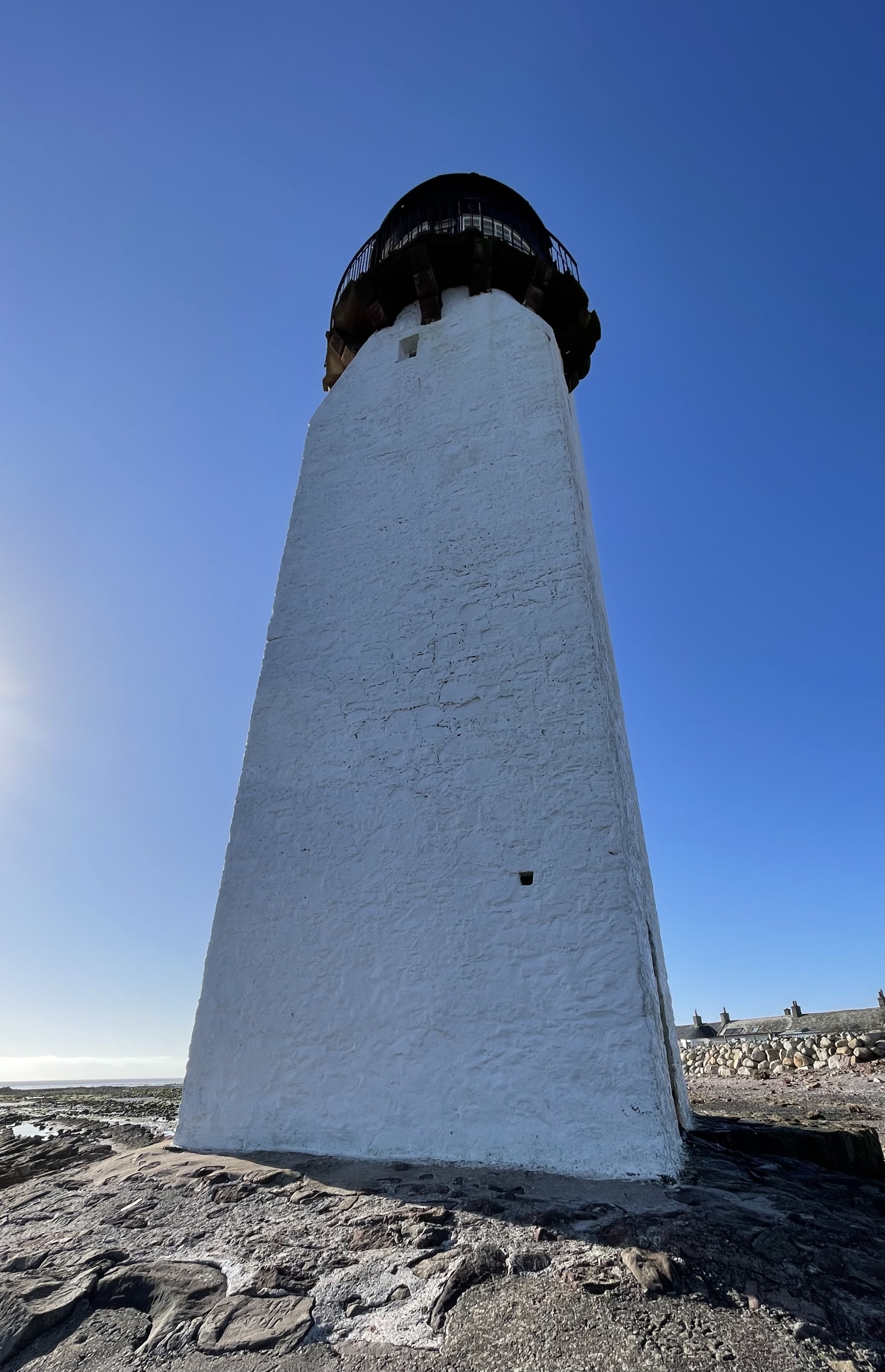
Lighthouse from the beach.

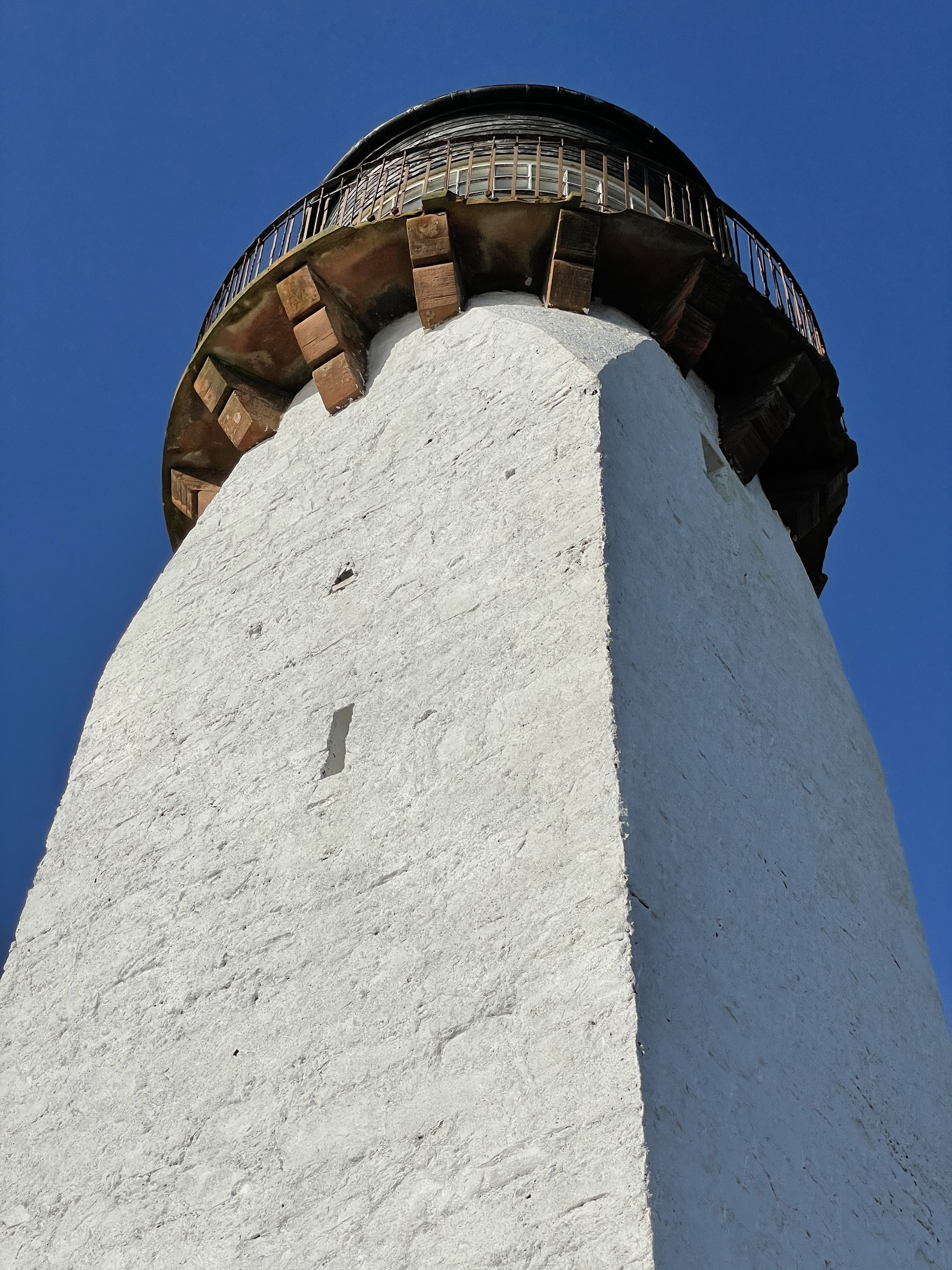

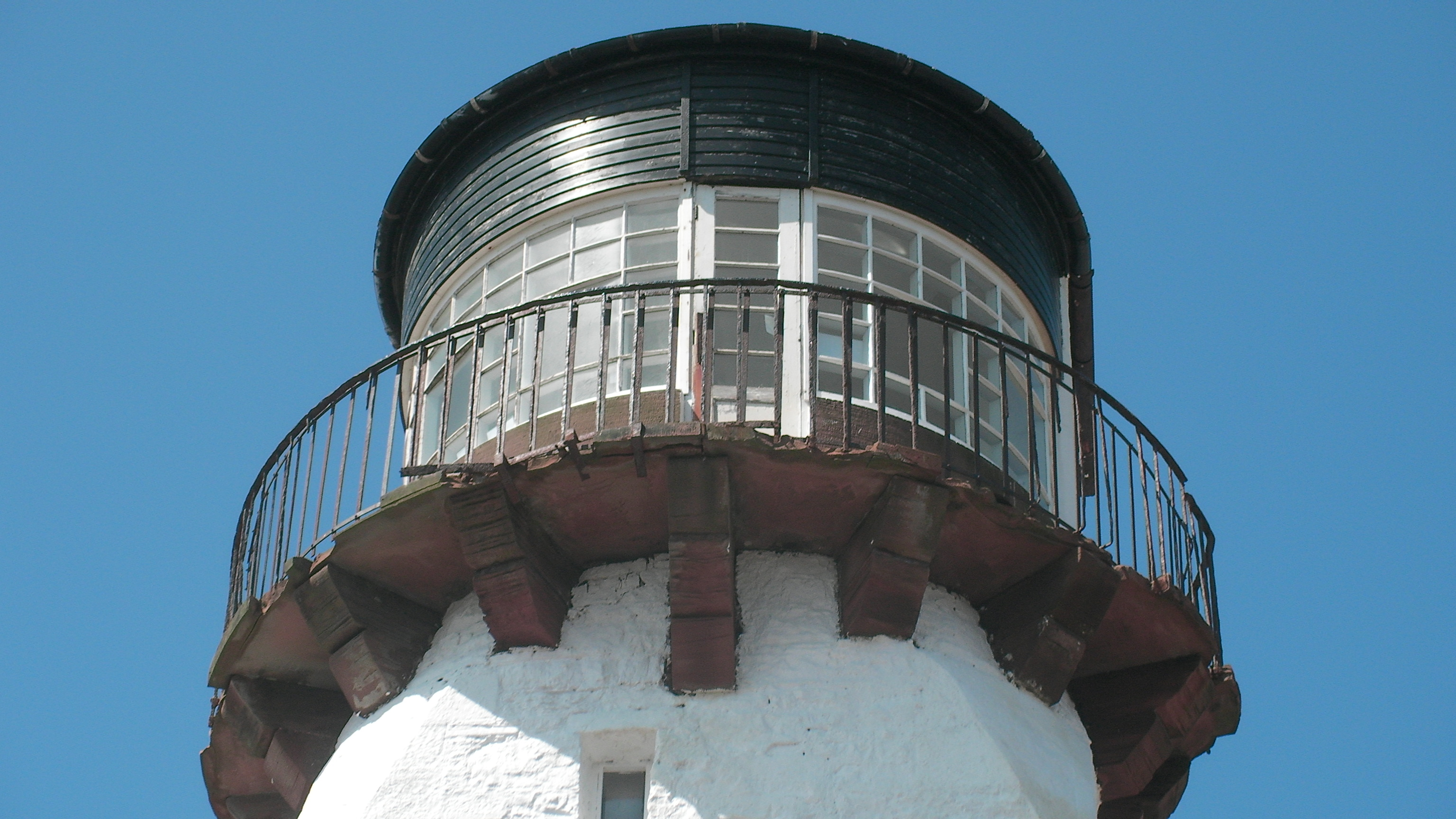
Top section showing erosion.

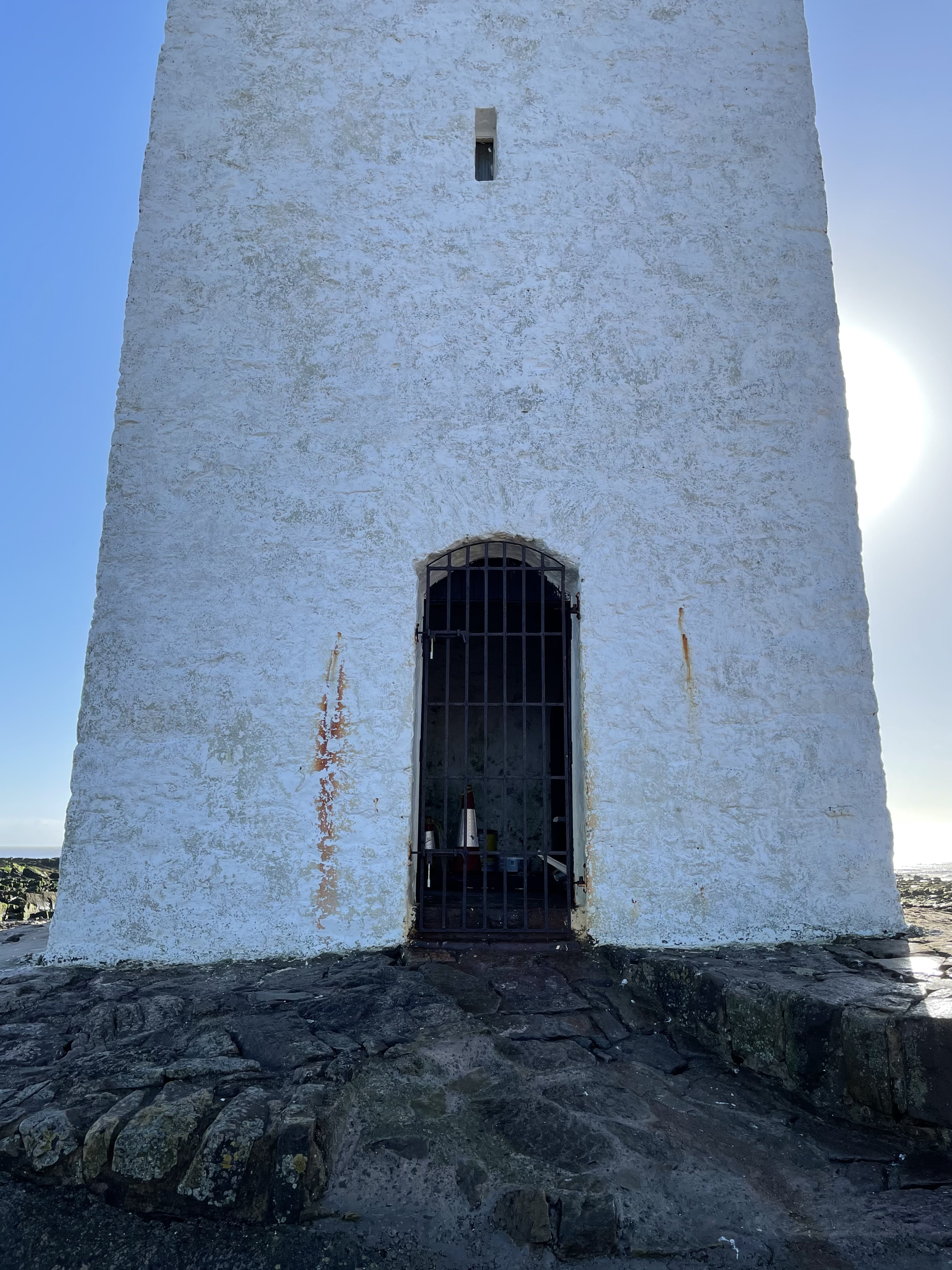
Lighthouse entrance.

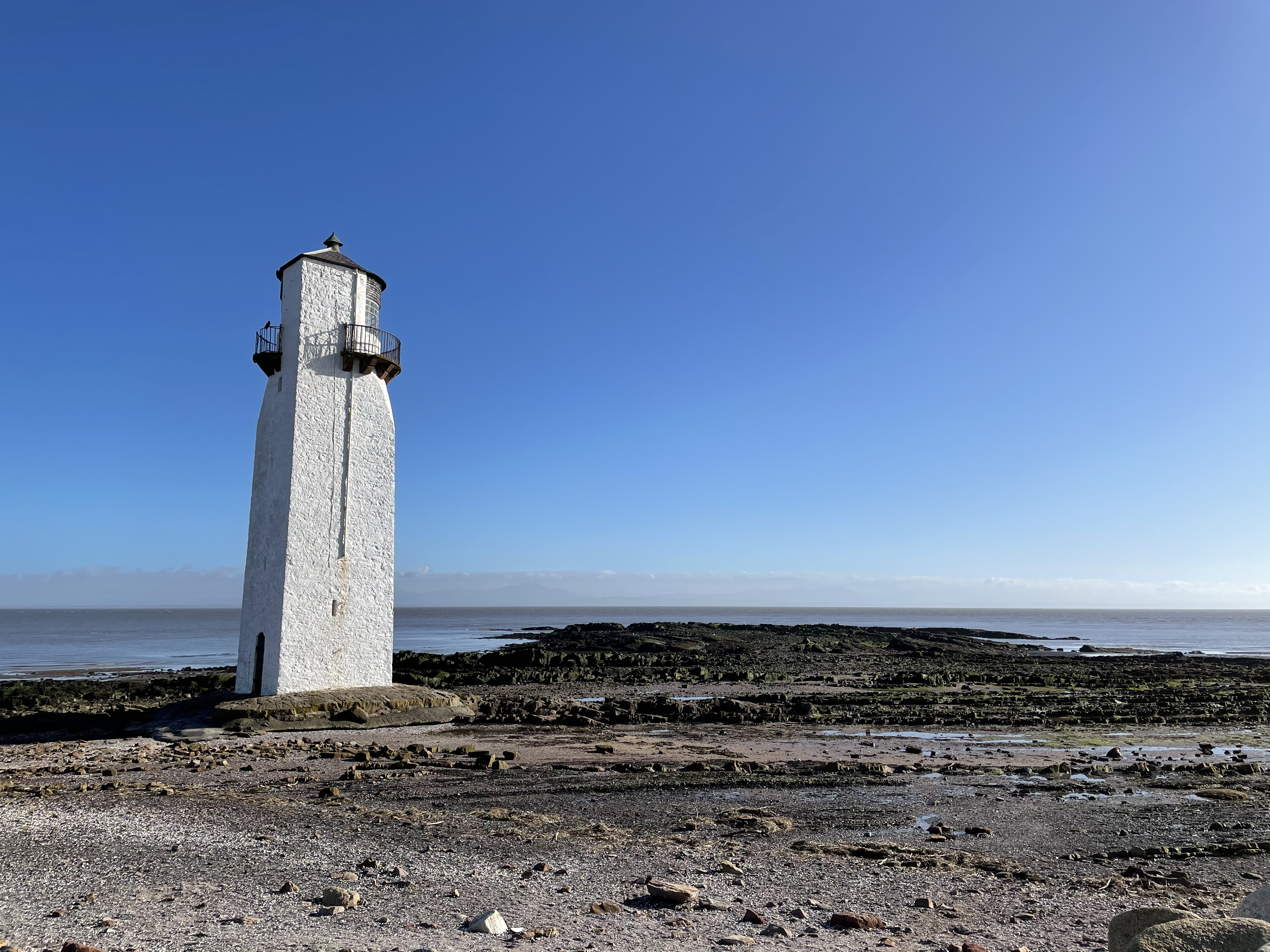

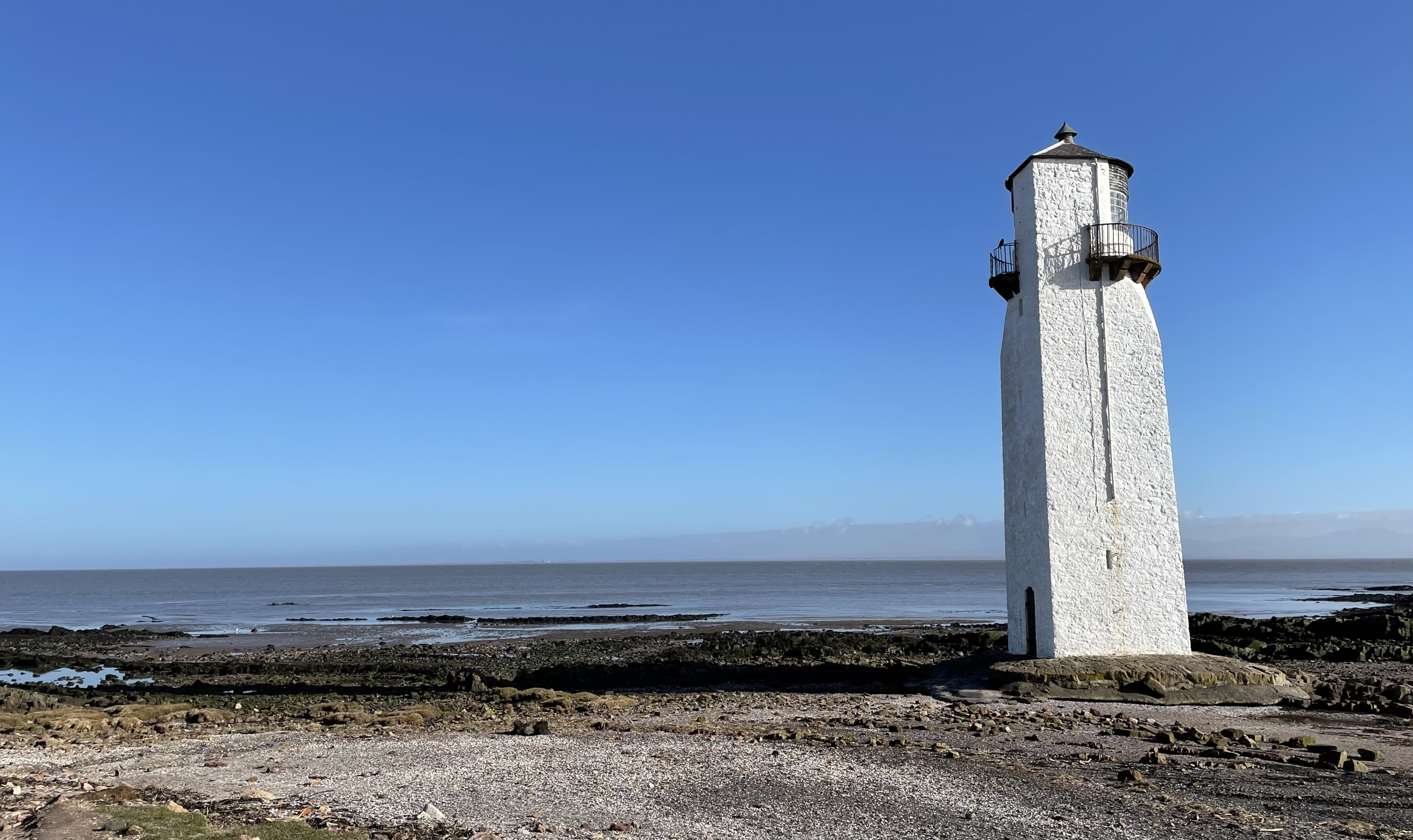

== See also ==
- List of lighthouses in Scotland
- List of Northern Lighthouse Board lighthouses
- List of Category A listed buildings in Dumfries and Galloway
