= South Holme =

Village and civil parish in North Yorkshire, England

Coordinates: 54.188160°N 0.93169898°W

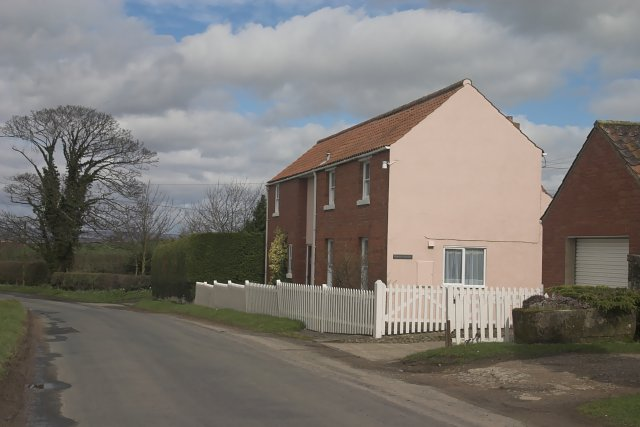

- Location within North Yorkshire
- Area: 3.66 km^{2} (1.41 sq mi)
- Population: 31 (2001 census)
  - Density: 8/km^{2} (21/sq mi)
- Civil parish: South Holme
- Unitary authority: North Yorkshire
- Ceremonial county: North Yorkshire
- Region: Yorkshire and the Humber
- Country: England
- Sovereign state: United Kingdom
- Police: North Yorkshire
- Fire: North Yorkshire
- Ambulance: Yorkshire

South Holme is a settlement and civil parish about 17 miles from York, in the county of North Yorkshire, England. In 2001 the parish had a population of 31. The parish touches Barton-le-Street, Fryton, Hovingham, Nunnington and Slingsby. South Holme shares a parish council with Slingsby and Fryton.

From 1974 to 2023 it was part of the district of Ryedale, it is now administered by the unitary North Yorkshire Council.

== Landmarks ==
There are three Listed buildings in South Holme and three working farms.

== History ==
The name "Holme" is Old Norse and means 'Island', South Holme may have been the first place in the area to be properly cultivated, the "South" part to distinguish from North Holme. South Holme was recorded in the Domesday Book as Holm/Holme. South Holme was a township in the parish of Hovingham, it became a separate parish in 1866.
