= Southerness =

Coordinates: 54.874560°N 3.598438°W

Southerness: Scots: Satterness
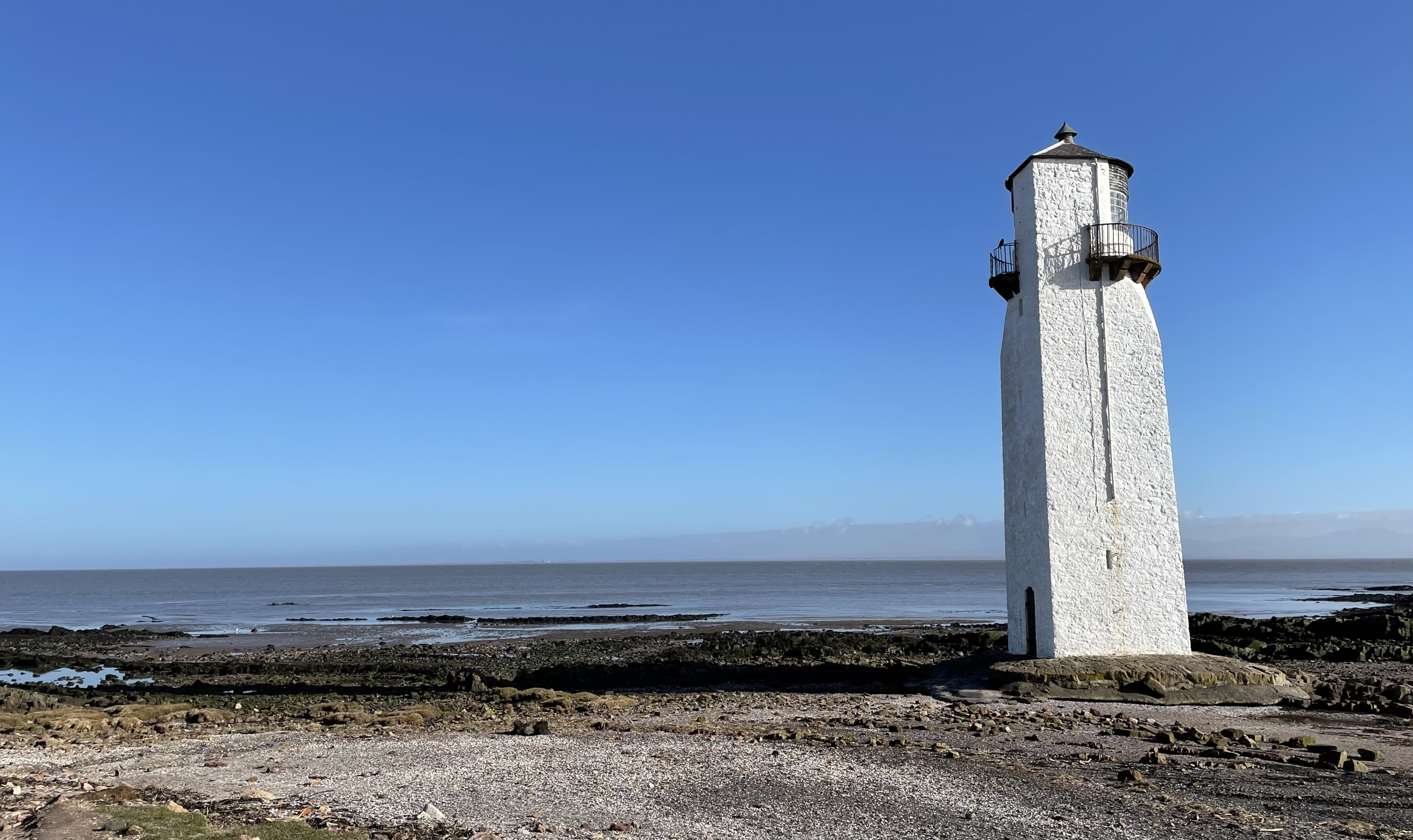
- Southerness Lighthouse and Solway Firth

- Location within Dumfries and Galloway
- Population: 170 (2001 Census)
- Council area: Dumfries and Galloway
- Lieutenancy area: Stewartry of Kirkcudbright
- Country: Scotland
- Sovereign state: United Kingdom
- Post town: Dumfries
- Postcode district: DG2
- Dialling code: 01387
- Police: Scotland
- Fire: Scottish
- Ambulance: Scottish
- UK Parliament: Dumfries and Galloway
- Scottish Parliament: Galloway and West Dumfries

Southerness (/sʌðə'nɛs/; Scots: Satterness) is a small, compact coastal village in Dumfries and Galloway, Scotland; it is approximately 2 mi (3.2 km) south of the A710 between Caulkerbush and Kirkbean.

Southerness has a large, shallow, sandy beaches on both sides of the rocky next to the village and to the west extend out to the vast Mersehead Sands exposed at low tide. The only landmark is its Southerness lighthouse which was built in 1749 and is one of the oldest lighthouses in Scotland. The lighthouse is approximately 56 feet (17 m) tall and was decommissioned in the 1930s.
