= South Side, County Durham =

Village in County Durham, England

Coordinates: 54.634°N 1.839°W

South Side
- Location within County Durham
- OS grid reference: NZ105265
- Unitary authority: County Durham
- Ceremonial county: County Durham
- Region: North East
- Country: England
- Sovereign state: United Kingdom
- Post town: DARLINGTON
- Postcode district: DL13
- Police: Durham
- Fire: County Durham and Darlington
- Ambulance: North East

South Side is a village in County Durham, in England. It is situated to the north of Butterknowle, a few miles west of Bishop Auckland.
