= Southorpe =

Civil parish in Cambridgeshire, England

Coordinates: 52.6°N 0.4°W

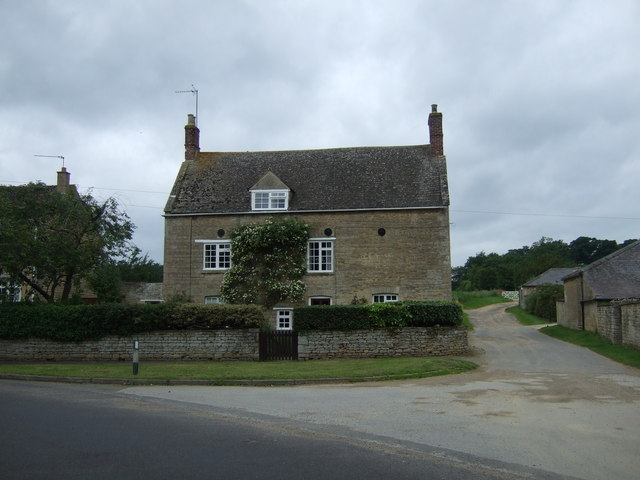
- Hall Farm

- Location within Cambridgeshire
- Population: 145 (2021 census)
- Unitary authority: Peterborough
- Ceremonial county: Cambridgeshire
- Region: East
- Country: England
- Sovereign state: United Kingdom
- Post town: Stamford
- Postcode district: PE9
- Police: Cambridgeshire
- Fire: Cambridgeshire
- Ambulance: East of England

Southorpe is a settlement and civil parish in Cambridgeshire, England. It is now within the Peterborough unitary authority area of the ceremonial county of Cambridgeshire but it was part of the Soke of Peterborough, an historic area that was traditionally associated with Northamptonshire. For electoral purposes it forms part of Barnack ward in North West Cambridgeshire constituency. The nearest town is Stamford in Lincolnshire. In 2021 the parish had a population of 145.

In the parish, towards Barnack, is the Grade I listed Walcot Hall.

== See also ==
- Southorpe Meadow
- Southorpe Paddock
- Southorpe Roughs
- Ufford Bridge railway station
