= Southcott, Frithelstock =

Coordinates: 50°55′42″N 4°12′37″W

Southcott
- Hamlet
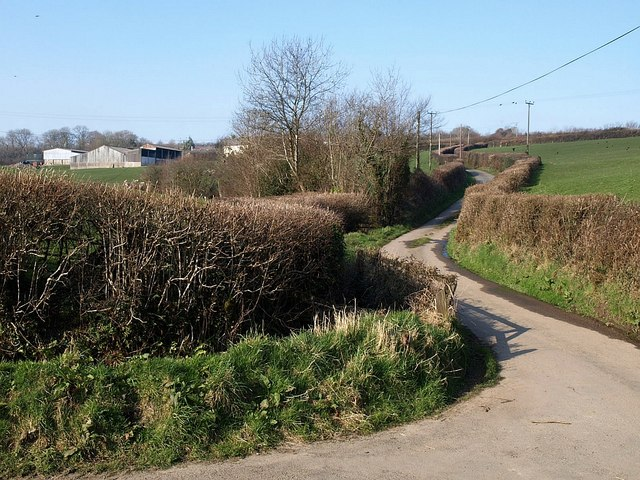
- Lane leading to Southcott

- Location within Devon
- Civil parish: Frithelstock
- District: Torridge
- Ceremonial county: Devon
- Region: South West
- Country: England
- Sovereign state: United Kingdom
- Post town: Torrington

Southcott is a hamlet west of Great Torrington in the parish of Frithelstock in the district of Torridge, Devon, England.
