= Southwood, Hampshire =

Suburb of Farnborough, Hampshire, England

Coordinates: 51.291213°N 0.783623°W

Southwood
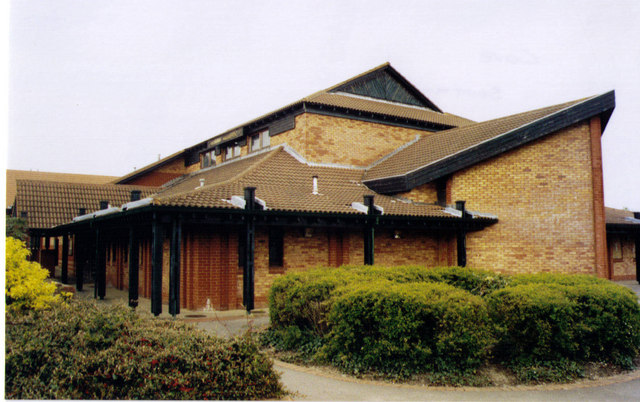

- Location within Hampshire
- District: Rushmoor
- Shire county: Hampshire
- Region: South East
- Country: England
- Sovereign state: United Kingdom
- Police: Hampshire and Isle of Wight
- Fire: Hampshire and Isle of Wight
- Ambulance: South East Coast

Southwood is a suburb of Farnborough, in the borough of Rushmoor, in Hampshire, England and adjacent to Cove. It is part of the Cove and Southwood ward.

== History ==
The land was once the location of Southwood Camp, Cove Radio Station and ancient farmland and woodland. A modern housing estate was built on the site in the 1980s.

== Business ==
The suburb used to be home to the Nokia UK headquarters and the Southwood Business Park, which as of July 2012 has 16 out of its 20 units let. BMW Group UK acquired the Nokia site and has its headquarters there, along with an Alphabet office. Other occupiers of the business park include Puritan Maid, MIDAS-Press, Loma Systems and Toshiba.

== Education ==
Southwood Infant school caters for local reception, year 1 and year 2 children.

== Amenities ==
Morrisons supermarket is the only shop on the estate along with its petrol station. There is also a church, clinic, dentist, medical surgery, petrol station and three pubs/restaurants, the 'Crab and Anchor', 'The Sarsen Stones' and the 'Monkey Puzzle'.

== Leisure ==
Its southern boundary consists of Southwood Woodland, an 80-acre wooded amenity for walkers and cyclists. The Nuffield Health health club in Links Way is the largest health club in Farnborough. There is a Monkey Puzzle restaurant and a Premier Inn Hotel in the southern part of the suburb.

== Transport ==
Southwood is crossed by the A327 road, which links Farnborough town centre with the M3 Motorway and Reading. The area is served by one school bus route, 441 to the town centre and All Hallows Catholic School, provided by Stagecoach in Hants and Surrey. It is also served by bus number 9 for the general public.
