= Midge Gillies =

British journalist and biographer

Midge Gillies PhD (b. 1962) is a British journalist, biographer and creative writing tutor.

She was educated at Girton College, Cambridge. Between 1989 - 1994 she worked as the city correspondent for the Birmingham Post. She has also written extensively for national newspapers including The Guardian and the Los Angeles Times. She is the author of nine nonfiction books, including biographies of the British music hall star Marie Lloyd and the pioneer woman aviator Amy Johnson. Nicholas Lezard reviewed The Barbed-Wire University in The Guardian, calling it "a moving and eye-opening account of the lives of second world war [sic] PoWs by the daughter of a man who was captured."

She was Royal Literary Fund Fellow at Magdalene College, Cambridge for three years, and is currently Academic Director for Creative Writing at the University of Cambridge Institute of Continuing Education.

Gillies is married to author and journalist Jim Kelly (author) and lives in Ely.

== Major works ==
- The Wedding Book. Bloomsbury, 1997. ISBN 0-297-82982-3
- Business Writing. Marshall Publishing, 1999. ISBN 1-84028-281-9
- Marie Lloyd: The One and Only. Gollancz, 1999. ISBN 0-575-06420-X
- Amy Johnson: Queen of the Air. Weidenfeld & Nicolson, 2003. ISBN 0-297-82982-3
- Waiting For Hitler: Voices From Britain on the Brink of Invasion. Hodder & Stoughton, 2006. ISBN 0-340-83798-5
- How to write Memoir & Biographies. Guardian News & Media, 2008
- Writing Lives: Literary Biography. Cambridge University Press, 2009. ISBN 978-0521732314
- The Barbed-Wire University: The Real Lives of Allied Prisoners of War in the Second World War. Aurum, 2011 (hardback) ISBN 978-1845136291; Safe Haven Books, 2025 (paperback). ISBN 978-1068516221
- Army Wives: from Crimea to Afghanistan: the real lives of the women behind the men in uniform. Aurum, 2017 ISBN 978-1781316665
- Piccadilly: the circus at the heart of London. John Murray, 2023. ISBN 978-1529339734
- Atlantic Furies: the women who risked everything to be the first to fly. Scribe, 2025. ISBN 978-1915590527.
