= Cromwell's House =

Cromwell's House may refer to:

- Cromwell's Other House, one of the two chambers of the Parliaments that legislated for England and Wales, Scotland and Ireland
- Oliver Cromwell's House, Cromwell's family home in Ely, Cambridgeshire
