= Chettisham Meadow =

Nature reserve in Cambridgeshire, England

Coordinates: 52.423°N 0.265°E

- Site of Special Scientific Interest
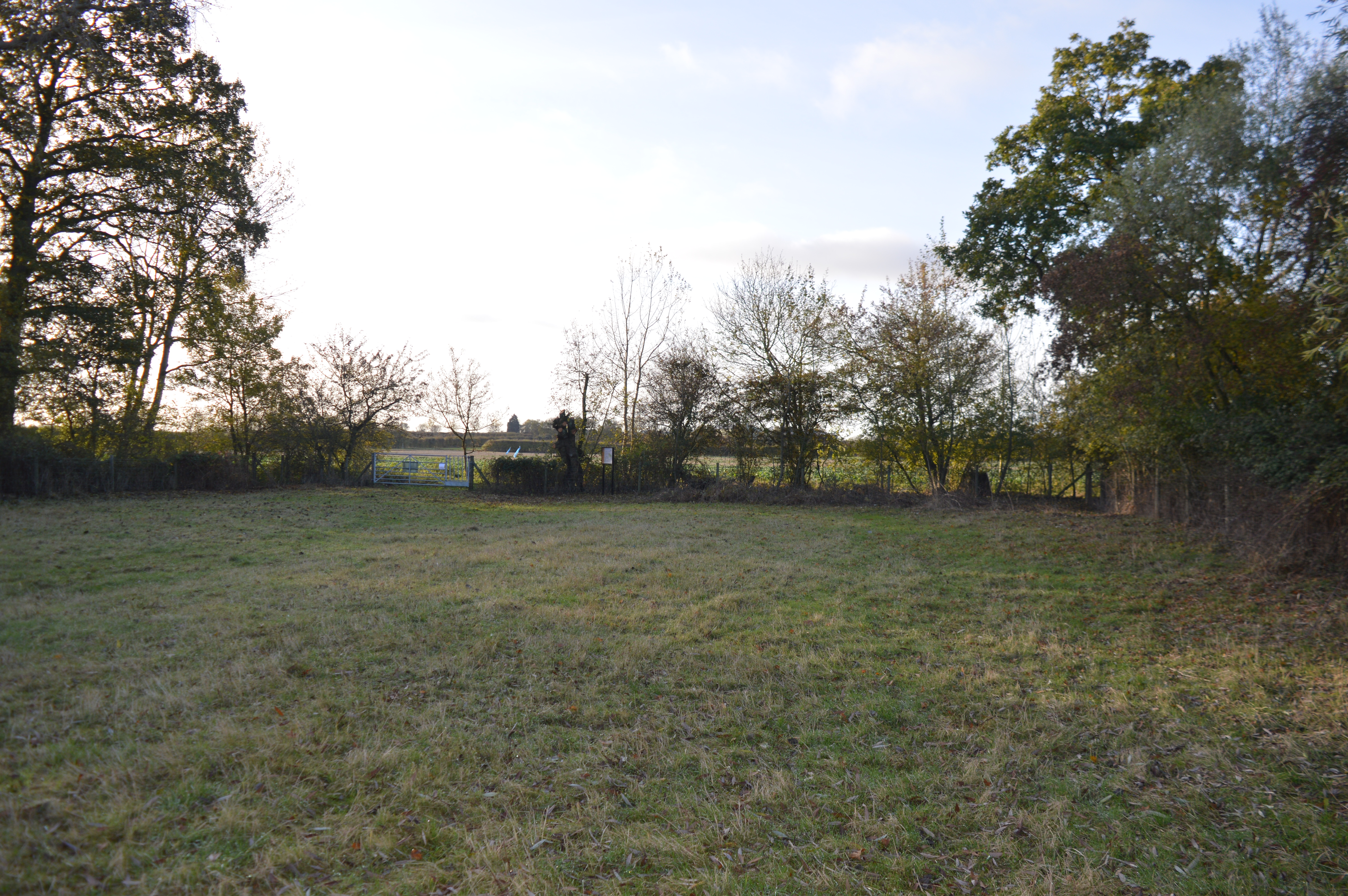
- Location of Chettisham Meadow.
- Area of search: Cambridgeshire
- Grid reference: TL 541 830
- Interest: Biological
- Area: 0.7 hectares
- Notification date: 1983
- Location map: Magic Map

Chettisham Meadow is a 0.7-hectare (1.7-acre) biological Site of Special Scientific Interest west of Chettisham, 3 km (2 mi) north of Ely in Cambridgeshire. It is managed by the Wildlife Trust for Bedfordshire, Cambridgeshire and Northamptonshire.

The site is grassland on calcareous clay, and evidence survives of ridge and furrow medieval farming. Flowering plants include adder's tongue, cowslip and the uncommon green-winged orchid.

There is access from Church Farm on the road called The Hamlet, by a track which crosses the A10, and curves to meet the track called The Balk. A footpath from the point where the two tracks meet leads to the reserve entrance.
