= Kate Ellis =

Kate Ellis may refer to:

- Kate Ellis (author), British author
- Kate Ellis (politician) (born 1977), Australian politician
