= Sessions House, Ely =

Courthouse in Cambridgeshire, England

Sessions House
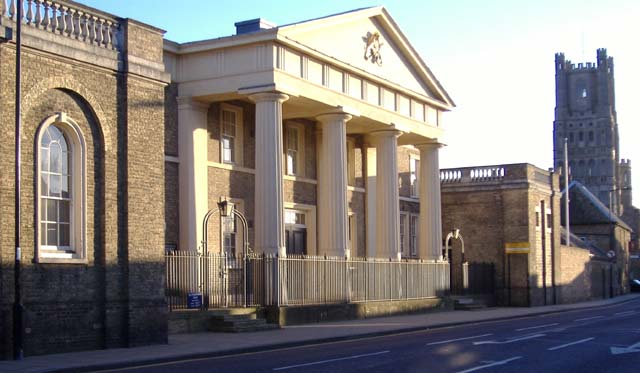

- Location within Cambridgeshire
- 52.4010°N 0.2632°E
- Location: Lynn Road, Ely

History
- Built: 1821

Site notes
- Architect: Charles Humphrey
- Architectural style: Palladian style

Listed Building – Grade II*
- Official name: Sessions House
- Designated: 22 September 1950
- Reference no.: 1296765

The Sessions House, formerly the Shire Hall, is a courthouse in Lynn Road, Ely, in the county of Cambridgeshire, England. The building, which is now used as the meeting place of the City of Ely Council, is a Grade II* listed building.

== History ==
The building was commissioned by the justices to replace an earlier sessions house in the Market Place. The site they selected, on the east side of Lynn Road, was owned by the Rev. John Bringhurst and the Dean and Chapter of Ely. The building was designed by Charles Humphrey in the Palladian style, built in buff brick with stone facings at a cost of £6,000 and was opened as the Shire Hall in June 1821.

The design involved an asymmetrical main frontage of nine bays facing Lynn Road with the end bays projected forward as pavilions. The central section of four bays formed a full-height tetrastyle portico with four fluted Doric order columns supporting an frieze with triglyphs and a pediment with the Royal coat of arms in the tympanum. At the back of the portico was a central double door. The other bays on the ground floor and all the bays on the first floor were fenestrated by sash windows with architraves. The north end block was fenestrated by a round headed window, while the south end block was fenestrated by two cell-type windows. Both end blocks were faced with corner pilasters and balustraded at roof level. Internally, the principal room was the main courtroom which was at the centre of the building.

In 1828, the Shire Hall was the venue for the trial and conviction of the poacher, John Rolfe, who was accused of murdering his poaching companion at Littleport. Rolfe was subsequently executed by hanging. A house of correction with 35 cells was erected behind the building in 1843. At the same time a chapel in the south end block was converted for use by the local police.

The building was initially used solely for judicial purposes but in 1850, it also became the meeting place of the local board, which met for the first time under the chairmanship of the dean of Ely Cathedral, George Peacock, on 11 October 1850. In 1894, the local board was succeeded by Ely Urban District Council, which also used the Shire Hall as its meeting place.

In the early 20th century, the 6th Cambridgeshire Rifle Volunteer Corps used the north end block as an armoury. After the Second World War, the council converted the old fire station at 6 Lynn Road to become its offices and meeting place, and relocated there.

The Shire Hall, which gradually became known as the Sessions House, remained in judicial use until 2011 when it closed, as part of central government measures to close 93 magistrates' courts across England and Wales. The building was subsequently acquired by City of Ely Council in 2013 to serve as its offices and meeting place. A scene from the comedy film, Harvey Greenfield Is Running Late, starring Annette Badland, was shot in the building in 2022.

== See also ==
- Listed buildings in Ely, Cambridgeshire
- Grade II* listed buildings in East Cambridgeshire
