= Roswell Pits =

Nature reserve in Cambridgeshire, England

Coordinates: 52.401°N 0.286°E

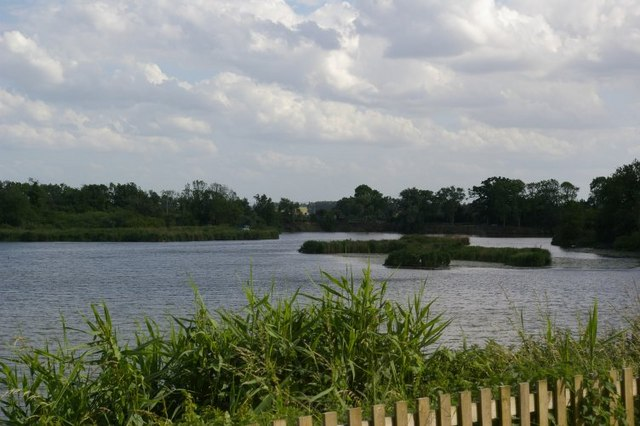
- The northern corner of the flooded pits
- Interactive map of Roswell Pits
- Type: Nature reserve
- Location: Ely, Cambridgeshire
- OS grid: TL 556 806
- Area: 8 hectares (20 acres)
- Manager: Environment Agency

Roswell Pits is a 20 acre nature reserve on the eastern outskirts of Ely in Cambridgeshire. It is managed by the Environment Agency. It is part of the Ely Pits and Meadows Site of Special Scientific Interest (SSSI)) and Geological Conservation Review site. The SSSI designation for both biological and geological interest. The site was formerly managed by the Wildlife Trust for Bedfordshire, Cambridgeshire and Northamptonshire.

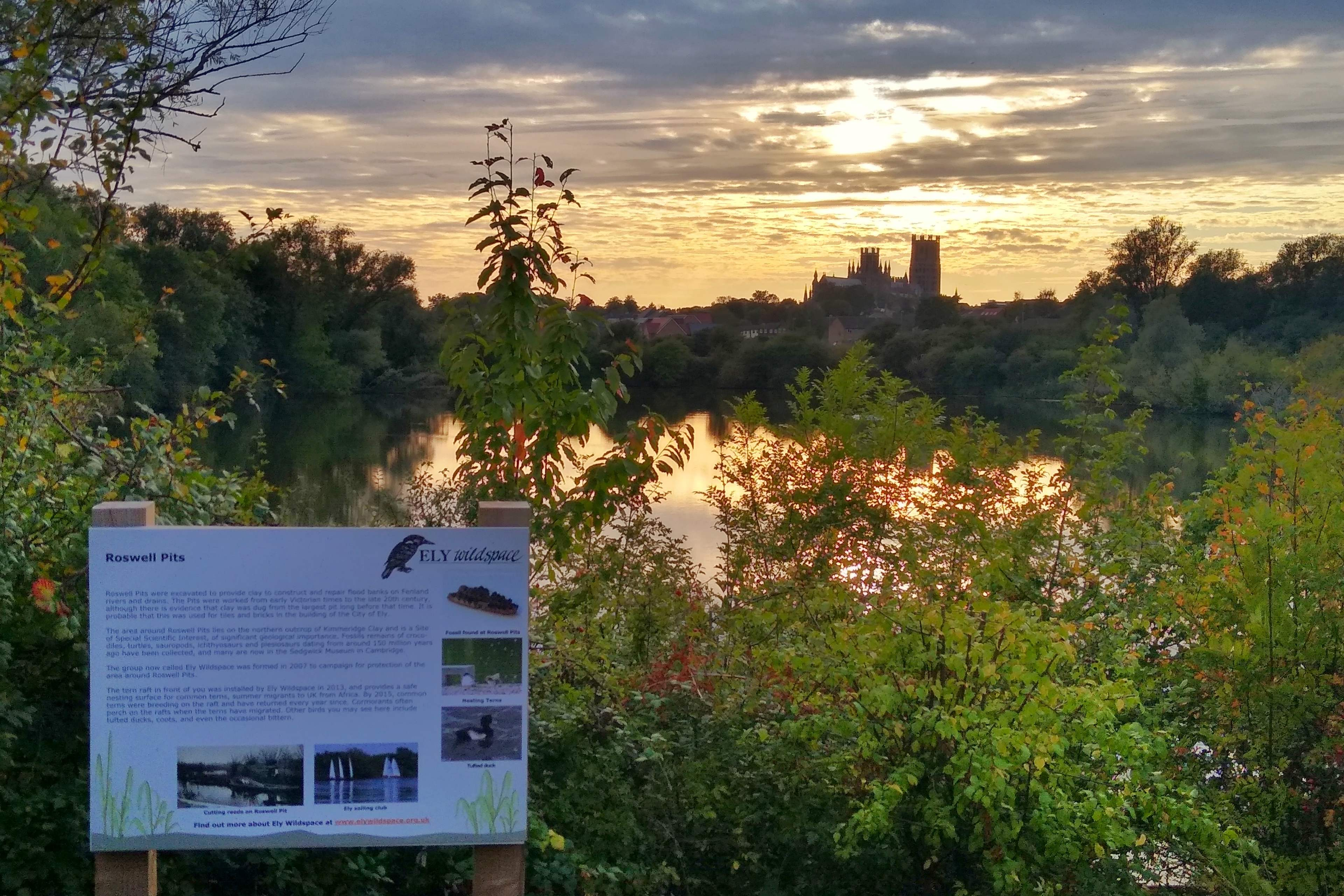
View of Ely Cathedral from Roswell Pits

== History ==
The pits were a source of gault, an impervious clay used to maintain river banks in the low-lying regions of the South Level of the Fens. Following the re-routing of the rivers in the region by Cornelius Vermuyden and his Adventurers in the 1650s, to more effectively drain the Fens, the peaty soils began to dry out and shrink. As the land surface sunk below the levels of the rivers, it became important to maintain the banks with something impervious to water, to prevent seepage into the newly drained agricultural land, and to prevent collapse of the banks and flooding of the land in times of heavy rainfall. Roswell Pits were an ideal source of this material, as they were located adjacent to the River Great Ouse, and boats could take the bulky material directly to the banks being maintained.

The men who carried the gault away were called "gaulters", and typically worked in gangs of three. The gang was managed by a Head Ganger, and a team of three men worked a train of five boats, each around 36 by 8.5 feet (11.0 by 2.6 m), and capable of holding 8 tons of gault (Kimmeridge) clay. Teams employed by the Burnt Fen Drainage District were provided with the boats, but had to supply a horse for towing the boats, and shovels and barrows for loading and unloading the gault. In 1810, Robert Fletcher and Co were paid £7/3/6 (£7.17) for 246 tons of gault delivered to the Burnt Fen District, a rate of 7 pence (3p) per ton. In 1886, the terms of the men were re-negotiated, because the Commissioners felt that the wages received were excessive. They calculated that each man would receive £1/12/6 (£1.62) per week if the team completed five round trips as expected. Gaulters ceased to be employed by the Burnt Fen District after 1920, when responsibility for the river banks passed to the newly formed Ouse Drainage Board. The pits continued to supply clay, with a new pit being started in 1947. Since extraction stopped, they have become a wetland wildlife habitat.

The pits were the subject of controversy in 2006 when the larger lake was sold to a new owner. A local group, Ely Wildspace accused the owner of having the intention of providing moorings for boats using the River Great Ouse. The lakes were by then home to a wide range of wildlife, and the two functions were seen as conflicting. The owner responded with their intention to create a wildlife reserve. Parts of the area were declared a Site of Special Scientific Interest in June 2008, in recognition of their geology and wetland habitat, and in the absence of a planning application by the owner, an enforcement notice was issued by East Cambridgeshire District Council, preventing further work being carried out. An appeal against the notice was rejected by the Planning Inspectorate on 14 November 2008, with the outcome that sections where work has been carried out will have to be returned to their previous state. In April 2009, the SSSI was extended to cover an area of 210 acres (85 ha), including nearly all of the former pits. A major intervention in 2020 by a private philanthropist saw the purchase from the Environment Agency of the smaller lake pit and its surrounding woodland habitat, together with the larger reed bed to its north east which has witnessed the return of breeding bittern, marsh harrier and Chettis Warbler.

== Ecology and geology ==
These former clay pits have lakes and reedbeds. Birds include common terns, kingfishers and reed warblers, there are flowers such as bee orchids and emperor dragonflies. The site has yielded fossils of dinosaurs, crocodiles and turtles.

== Access ==
The reserve is in two nearby areas, and access is from Kiln Lane, which passes between them.
