= Ely, Cambridgeshire =

Cathedral city in Cambridgeshire, England

Coordinates: 52°23′53″N 00°15′44″E

Ely
- Cathedral city
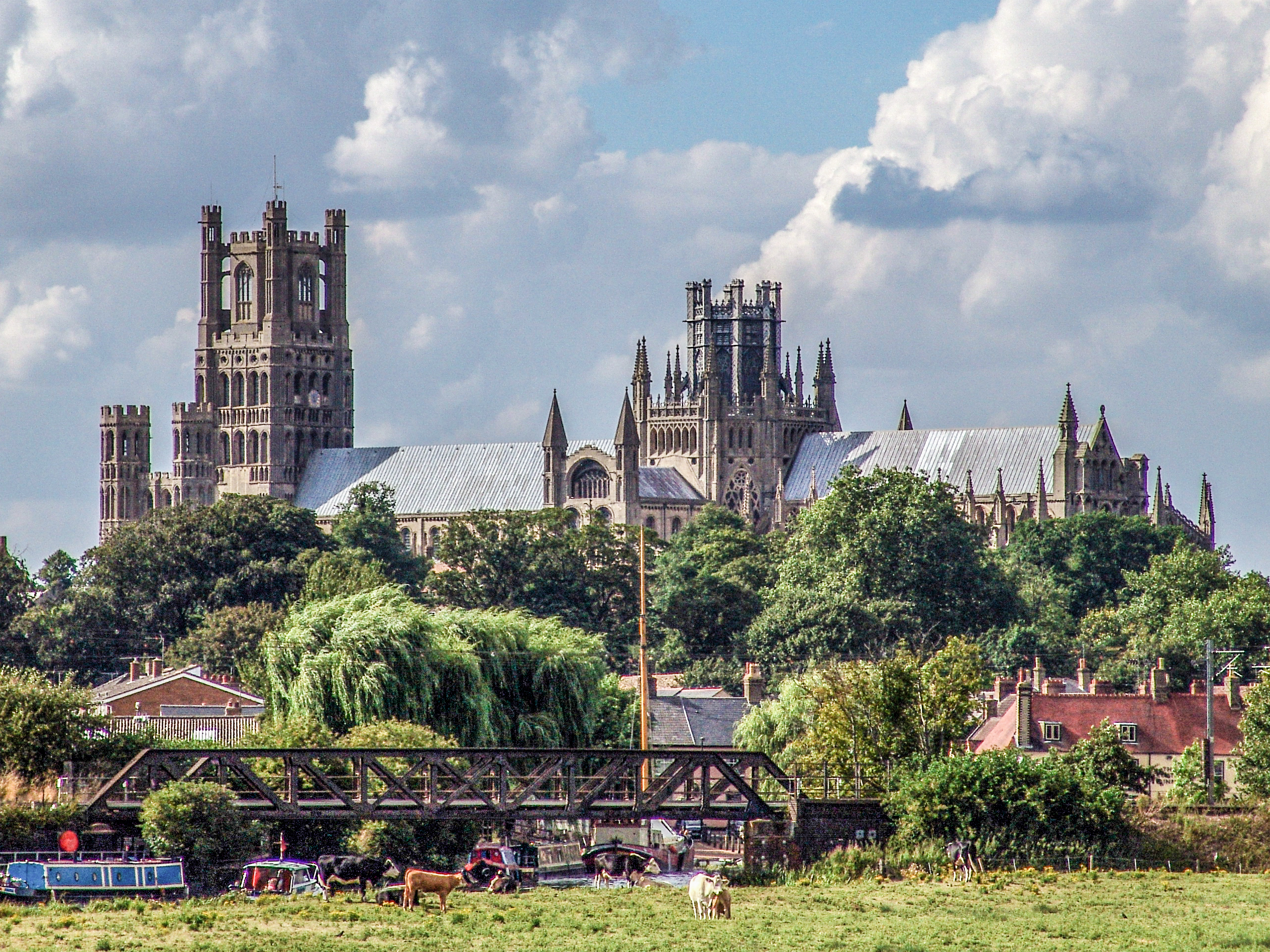
- Ely Cathedral from the south-east

- Location within Cambridgeshire
- Interactive map of Ely
- Area: 22.8 sq mi (59 km^{2}) (Parish); 1.8 sq mi (4.7 km^{2}) (Built up area)
- Population: 20,574 (Parish, 2021) 19,185 (Built up area, 2021)
  - Density: 902/sq mi (348/km^{2})
  - London: 80 mi (130 km) SSW
- Civil parish: Ely
- District: East Cambridgeshire
- Shire county: Cambridgeshire
- Region: East
- Country: England
- Sovereign state: United Kingdom
- Areas of the city: List: Ely; Chettisham; Prickwillow; Queen Adelaide; Stuntney; Mile End
- Post town: ELY
- Postcode district: CB6, CB7
- Dialling code: 01353
- Police: Cambridgeshire
- Fire: Cambridgeshire
- Ambulance: East of England
- UK Parliament: Ely and East Cambridgeshire
- Website: www.cityofelycouncil.org.uk

Ely (/ˈiːli/ EE-lee) is a cathedral city and civil parish in the district of East Cambridgeshire in Cambridgeshire, England. It lies 14 miles (23 km) north-east of Cambridge, 24 miles (39 km) south-east of Peterborough, and 80 miles (130 km) from London. As well as the built up area itself, the parish also covers surrounding rural areas including the settlements of Chettisham, Prickwillow, Mile End, Queen Adelaide, and Stuntney. At the 2021 census the built up area had a population of 19,185 and the parish had a population of 20,574.

Ely is built on a 23-square-mile (60 km^{2}) Kimmeridge Clay island which, at 85 feet (26 m), is the highest land in the Fens. It was due to this topography that Ely was not waterlogged like the surrounding Fenland, and an island separated from the mainland. Major rivers including the Witham, Welland, Nene and Great Ouse feed into the Fens and, until draining commenced in the eighteenth century, formed freshwater marshes and meres within which peat was laid down. Once the Fens were drained, this peat created a rich and fertile soil ideal for farming.

The River Great Ouse was a significant means of transport until the Fens were drained and Ely ceased to be an island in the seventeenth century. The river is now a popular boating spot and has a large marina. Although now surrounded by land, the city is still known as the Isle of Ely.

There are two Sites of Special Scientific Interest in the city: a former Kimmeridge Clay quarry, and one of the United Kingdom's best remaining examples of medieval ridge and furrow agriculture.

The economy of the region is mainly agricultural. Before the Fens were drained, eel fishing was an important activity, from which the settlement's name may have been derived. Other important activities included wildfowling, peat extraction, and the harvesting of osier (willow) and sedge (rush). The city had been the centre of local pottery production for more than 700 years, including pottery known as Babylon ware. A Roman road, Akeman Street, passes through the city; the southern end is at Ermine Street near Wimpole and its northern end is at Brancaster. Little direct evidence of Roman occupation in Ely exists, although there are nearby Roman settlements such as those at Little Thetford and Stretham.

A coach route, known to have existed in 1753 between Ely and Cambridge, was improved in 1769 as a turnpike (toll road). The present-day A10 closely follows this route. Ely railway station, built in 1845, is on the Fen Line and is now a railway hub, with lines north to King's Lynn, northwest to Peterborough, east to Norwich, southeast to Ipswich and south to Cambridge and London.

Henry II granted the first annual fair, Saint Etheldreda's (or Saint Audrey's) seven-day event, to the abbot and convent on 10 October 1189. The word "tawdry" originates from cheap lace sold at this fair. A weekly market has taken place in Ely Market Square since at least the 13th century. Markets are now held on Thursdays, Saturdays and Sundays, with a farmers' market on the second and fourth Saturdays of each month.

Present-day annual events include the Eel Festival in May, established in 2004, and a fireworks display in Ely Park, first staged in 1974. The city of Ely has been twinned with Denmark's oldest town, Ribe, since 1956. Ely City Football Club was formed in 1885.

== Toponymy ==
The origin and meaning of Ely's name have always been deemed obscure by place name scholars and are still disputed. The earliest record of the name is in the Latin text of Bede's Ecclesiastical History of the English People, written c. 731, where it is written as Elge. This is apparently not a Latin name, and subsequent Latin texts nearly all used the forms Elia, Eli, or Heli with inorganic H-. In Old English charters, and in the Anglo-Saxon Chronicle, the spelling is usually Elig. Bede states that the name was a reference to the large number of eels caught in the marshes there.

Skeat derived the name Ely from what he called "O[ld] Northumbrian" ēlġē, meaning "district of eels". This uses a hypothetical word *ġē, which is not recorded in isolation but thought by some to be related to the modern German word Gau, meaning "district". The theory is that the name then developed a vowel to become ēliġē, and was afterwards re-interpreted to mean "Eel Island". This essentially is the explanation accepted by Reaney, Ekwall, Mills and Watts.

But difficulties remain. Bailey, in his discussion of ġē names, has pointed out that Ely would be anomalous if really from ēlġē "eel district", being remote from the areas where possible examples of ġē names occur, and moreover, there is no parallel for the use of a fish-name in compounds with ġē. More seriously, the usual English spelling remains Elig, even in the dative case used after many prepositions, where Elige would be expected if the second element were īġ "island". This is in conflict with all the other island names which surround Ely.

Another option, discussed by Miller in Fenland Notes and Queries, is that the name is an old Celtic name deriving either from the Brythonic helig (modern Welsh helyg) meaning willows or heli meaning salt water. Miller construes the name as meaning the singular and thinks it odd a place so abounding in the trees would be called 'a willow'.

== History ==
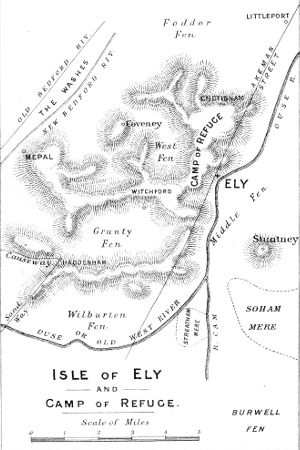
1880 map of the Isle of Ely with nearby rivers

=== Pre-history ===
Roswell Pits (Note: Roswell Pits are also known as Roslyn Hole and Roslyn Pit) are a palaeontologically significant Site of Special Scientific Interest (SSSI) one mile (1.6 km) northeast of the city. The Jurassic Kimmeridge Clays were quarried in the 19th and 20th centuries for the production of pottery and for maintenance of river embankments. Many specimens of ammonites, belemnites and bivalves were found during quarrying, in addition to an almost complete specimen of a pliosaur.

There is some scattered evidence of Late Mesolithic to Bronze Age activity in Ely such as Neolithic flint tools, a Bronze Age axe and spearhead. There is slightly denser Iron Age and Roman activity with some evidence of at least seasonal occupation. For example, a possible farmstead, of the late Iron Age to early Roman period, was discovered at West Fen Road and some Roman pottery was found close to the east end of the cathedral on The Paddock. There was a Roman settlement, including a tile kiln built over an earlier Iron Age settlement, in Little Thetford, three miles (5 km) to the south.

=== Medieval period ===
The city's origins lay in the foundation of an abbey in 673, one mile (1.6 km) to the north of the village of Cratendune on the Isle of Ely, under the protection of Saint Etheldreda, daughter of King Anna. St Etheldreda (also known as Æthelthryth) was a queen, founder and abbess of Ely. She built a monastery in 673 AD, on the site of what is now Ely Cathedral. This first abbey was destroyed in 870 by Danish invaders and rededicated to Etheldreda in 970 by Ethelwold, Bishop of Winchester. The abbots of Ely then accumulated such wealth in the region that in the Domesday survey (1086) it was the "second richest monastery in England". The first Norman bishop, Simeon, started building the cathedral in 1083. The octagon was rebuilt by sacrist Alan of Walsingham between 1322 and 1328 after the collapse of the original nave crossing on 22 February 1322. Ely's octagon is considered "one of the wonders of the medieval world". Architectural historian Nikolaus Pevsner believes the octagon "is a delight from beginning to end for anyone who feels for space as strongly as for construction" and is the "greatest individual achievement of architectural genius at Ely Cathedral". This gave the cathedral its distinctive shape, earning it the moniker, "The Ship of the Fens". Building continued until the dissolution of the abbey in 1539 during the Reformation. The cathedral was sympathetically restored between 1845 and 1870 by the architect George Gilbert Scott. As the seat of a diocese, Ely has long been considered a city; in 1974, city status was granted by royal charter.

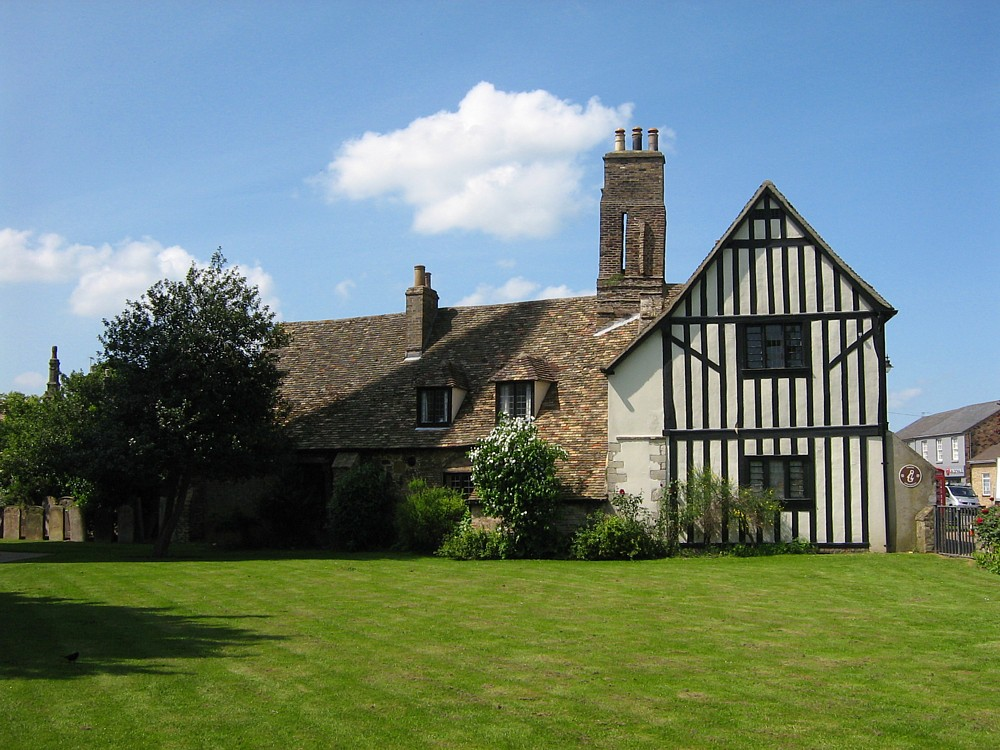
East aspect of St Mary's vicarage, a Grade II* listed building. Oliver Cromwell lived here between 1638 and 1646. Since 1990, the building has been open as the Oliver Cromwell's House tourist attraction and as Ely's tourist information centre. (Note: Plaque inside the building)

Cherry Hill is the site of Ely Castle which is of Norman construction and is a United Kingdom scheduled monument. Of similar construction to Cambridge Castle, the 250-foot (76 m) diameter, 40 feet (12 m) high citadel-type motte and bailey is thought to be a royal defence built by William the Conqueror following submission of the Isle from rebels such as the Earl Morcar and the folk-hero Hereward the Wake from the Ely Rebellion. This would date the first building of the castle to c. 1070.

Henry III of England granted a market to the Bishop of Ely using letters close on 9 April 1224 although Ely had been a trading centre prior to this. Present weekly market days are Thursday and Saturday and seasonal markets are held monthly on Sundays and Bank Holiday Mondays from Easter to November.

=== Protestant martyrs ===
Following the accession of Mary I of England to the throne in 1553, the papacy made its first effective efforts to enforce the Pope Paul III-initiated Catholic reforms in England. During this time, which became known as the Marian Persecutions, two men from Wisbech, constable William Wolsey and painter Robert Pygot, "were accused of not ... believing that the body and blood of Christ were present in the bread and wine of the sacrament of mass". For this Christian heresy they were condemned by the bishop's chancellor, John Fuller, on 9 October 1555. On 16 October 1555 they were burnt at the stake "probably on the Palace Green in front of Ely Cathedral". In The Book of Ely published in 1990, Blakeman writes that "permission was not given" for a memorial to the martyrs to be placed on Palace Green. In 2011, a plaque recording this martyrdom event was erected on the northeast corner of Palace Green by the City of Ely Perspective. The plaque is located 2 inches from the pavement floor in an obscure, easily missed corner.

=== Oliver Cromwell ===
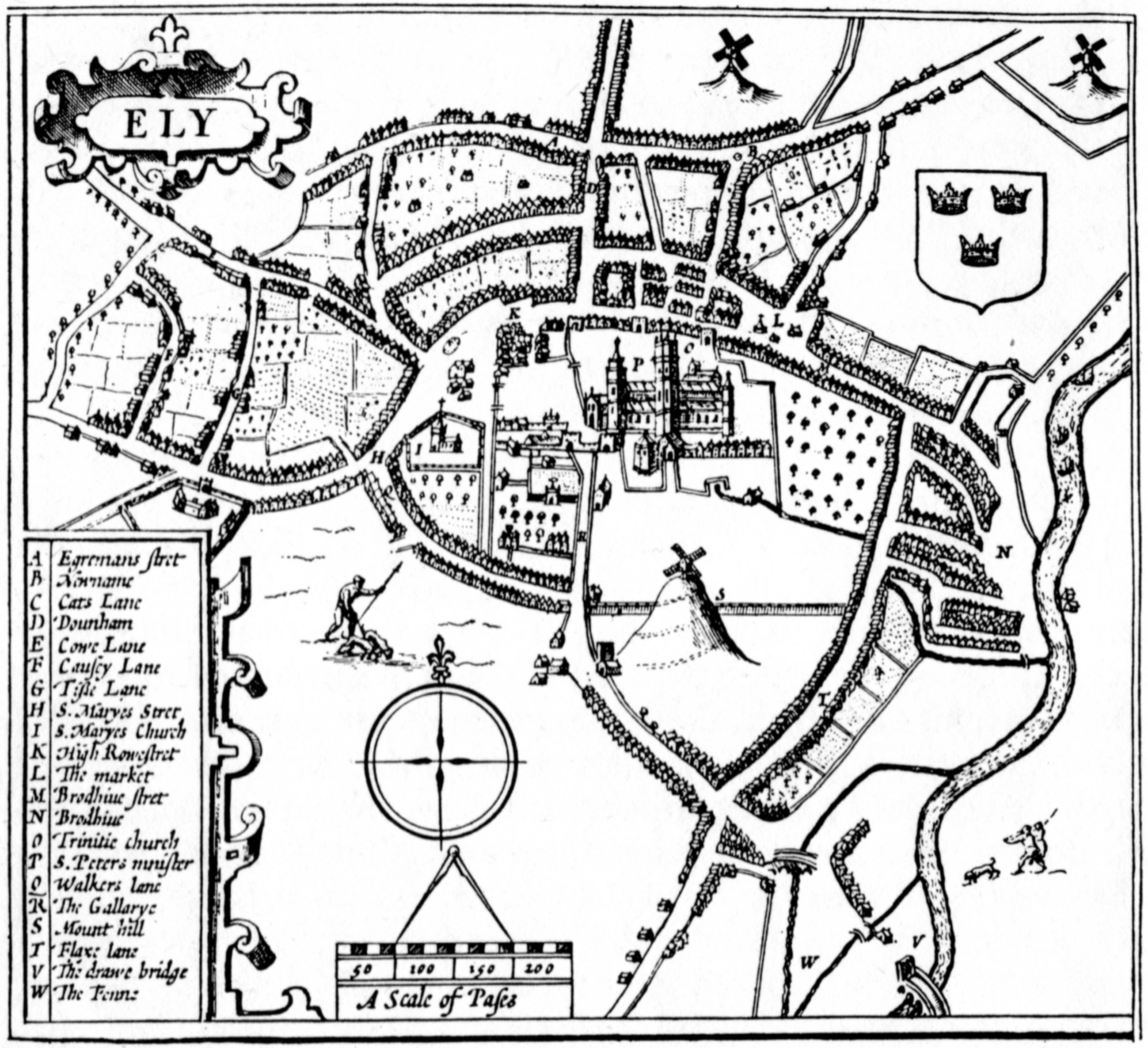
Earliest known map of Ely by John Speed, 1610. (Note: Taken from Dorman 1986 p. 54 which originates from John Speed's plan of Ely on his 1610 Huntingdonshire map) The cathedral is dedicated to St Peter at this time and a windmill is shown on Mount Hill where the post-conquest motte and bailey Ely Castle once stood. In the 18th century the Reverend James Bentham planted trees on Mount Hill which was named Cherry Hill at least since 1821.

Oliver Cromwell lived in Ely from 1636 to 1646 after inheriting St Mary's vicarage, a 16th-century property — now known as Oliver Cromwell's House — from his mother's brother, Sir Thomas Steward. The house is now open to the public. During this time Cromwell was a tax collector, though was also one of the governors of Thomas Parsons' Charity, which dates back to 1445 and was granted a Royal Charter by Charles I of England. The Charity still provides grants and housing to deserving local applicants.

There was a form of early workhouse in 1687, perhaps at St Mary's, which may have been part of an arrangement made between the Ely people and a Nicholas Wythers of Norwich in 1675. He was paid £30 per annum to employ the poor to "spin jersey" and was to pay them in money not goods. A purpose-built workhouse was erected in 1725 for 35 inmates on what is now St Mary's Court. Four other workhouses existed, including Holy Trinity on Fore Hill for 80 inmates (1738–1956) and the Ely Union workhouse, built in 1837, which housed up to 300 inmates. The latter became Tower Hospital in 1948 and is now a residential building, Tower Court. Two other former workhouses were the Haven Quayside for unmarried mothers and another on the site of what is now the Hereward Hall in Silver Street.

=== Post-medieval decline ===
The diaries of writers and journalists such as William Camden, Celia Fiennes, Daniel Defoe, John Byng and William Cobbett illustrate the decline of Ely after the 14th century plague and the 16th century reformation which led to the dissolution of the monastery in 1539. In the 1607 edition of Britannia, (Note: First published in 1586. In 1610, Philemon Holland translated the 1607 edition from the original Latin) chorographic surveyor William Camden records that "as for Ely it selfe, it is no small Citie, or greatly to be counted off either for beauty or frequency and resort, as having an unwholsome aire by reason of the fens round about". (Note: Originally "Ipsa vero Elye urbs est non-exigua, nec sua sane vel elegentia vel frequentia praedicanda, utpote ob uliginosum situm, coelo parum salubri" which Google translates as "The city is no small for Elias, nor the frequency of his or elegentia or, indeed, be preached, for instance because of wet site, wholesome little heaven") In 1698, Celia Fiennes was writing "the Bishop [Simon Patrick] does not Care to stay long in this place not being for his health ... they have lost their Charter ... and its a shame [the Bishop] does not see it better ordered and y^{e} buildings and streetes put in a better Condition. They are a slothful people and for little but y^{e} takeing Care of their Grounds and Cattle w^{ch} is of vast advantage". Daniel Defoe, when writing in the Eastern Counties section of A tour thro' the whole island of Great Britain (1722), went "to Ely, whose cathedral, standing in a level flat country, is seen far and wide ... that some of it is so antient, totters so much with every gust of wind, looks so like a decay, and seems so near it, that when ever it does fall, all that 'tis likely will be thought strange in it, will be, that it did not fall a hundred years sooner".

The prison reformer John Howard visited Ely and described the conditions in The Gaol:- "This gaol the property of the bishop, who is lord of the franchise of the Isle of Ely, was in part rebuilt by the late bishop about ten years ago; upon complaint of the cruel method* which for want of a safe gaol, the Keeper took to secure his prisoners (*This was by chaining them down upon their backs on a floor, across which were several iron bars and iron collar with spikes about their neck). The gaoler John Allday did not receive a salary". He records that the number of debtors outnumbered the number of felons in the prison.

On his way to a Midlands tour, John Byng visited Ely on 5 July 1790 staying at the Lamb Inn. In his diary (Note: According to Dorman) he writes that "the town [Ely] is mean, to the extreme ... those withdrawn, their dependancies must decay". Recording in his Rural Rides on 25 March 1830, William Cobbett reports that "Ely is what one may call a miserable little town: very prettily situated, but poor and mean. Everything seems to be on the decline, as, indeed, is the case everywhere, where the clergy are the masters".

The Ely and Littleport riots occurred between 22 and 24 May 1816. At the Special Commission assizes, held at Ely between 17 and 22 June 1816, 24 rioters were condemned. Nineteen had their sentences variously commuted from penal transportation for life to twelve months' imprisonment; the remaining five were executed on 28 June 1816. An outbreak of cholera isolated Ely in 1832.

=== Victorian and twentieth-century regeneration ===
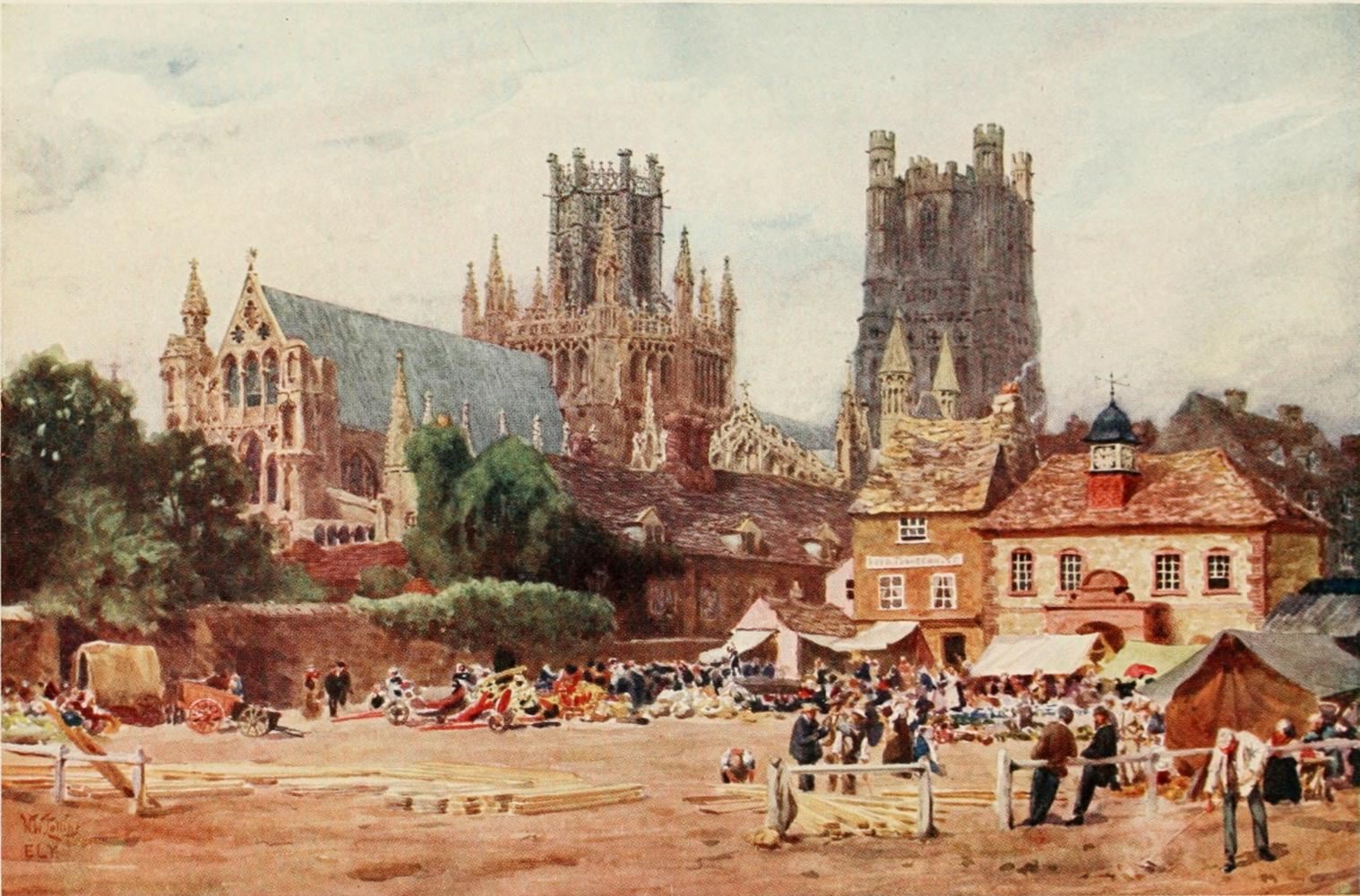
The Market Place, Ely, pencil and watercolour by W. W. Collins published 1908 showing northeast aspect of Ely Cathedral in the background with the Almonry—now a restaurant and art gallery—in front of that and the 1847 corn exchange building, now demolished, to the right of the picture.

Ely Cathedral was "the first great cathedral to be thoroughly restored". Work commenced in 1845 and was completed nearly thirty years later; most of the work was "sympathetically" carried out by the architect George Gilbert Scott. The only pavement labyrinth to be found in an English cathedral was installed below the west tower in 1870.

For over 800 years the cathedral and its associated buildings — built on an elevation 68 feet (21 m) above the nearby fens — have visually influenced the city and its surrounding area. Geographer John Jones, writing in 1924, reports that "from the roof of King's Chapel in Cambridge, on a clear day, Ely [cathedral] can be seen on the horizon, 16 miles (26 km) distant, an expression of the flatness of the fens". In 1954, architectural historian Nikolaus Pevsner wrote "as one approaches Ely on foot or on a bicycle, or perhaps in an open car, the cathedral dominates the picture for miles around ... and offers from everywhere an outline different from that of any other English cathedral". Local historian Pamela Blakeman reports a claim that "Grouped around [the cathedral] ... is the largest collection of medieval buildings still in daily use in this country".

=== Liberty of Ely ===
The abbey at Ely was one of many which were refounded in the Benedictine reforms of King Edgar the Peaceful (943–975). The "special and peculiarly ancient" honour and freedoms given to Ely by charter at that time may have been intended to award only fiscal privilege, but have been interpreted to confer on subsequent bishops the authority and power of a ruler. These rights were reconfirmed in charters granted by Edward the Confessor and in William the Conqueror's confirmation of the old English liberty at Kenford. The Isle of Ely was mentioned in some statutes (Note: For example in 33 Hen. 8. c. 10 and in the Writ De Excommunicato Capiendo Act 1562) as a county palatine; (Note: "Palatine". Oxford English Dictionary online. Oxford University Press. 2011. "Originally: designating a county or other territory in England (and later other countries) as having a ruler with royal privileges and judicial authority (within the territory) which elsewhere belong to the sovereign alone (now hist.). Later: designating a modern administrative area corresponding to this. Usu. as postmodifier, esp. in county palatine."(subscription required)) this provided an explanation of the bishop's royal privileges and judicial authority, which would normally belong to the sovereign; but legal authorities such as Sir Edward Coke did not completely endorse the form of words. These bishop's rights were not fully extinguished until 1837.

The hundreds covered by the liberty were Carlford, Colneis, Plomesgate, Loes, Wilford and Thredling.

== City status ==
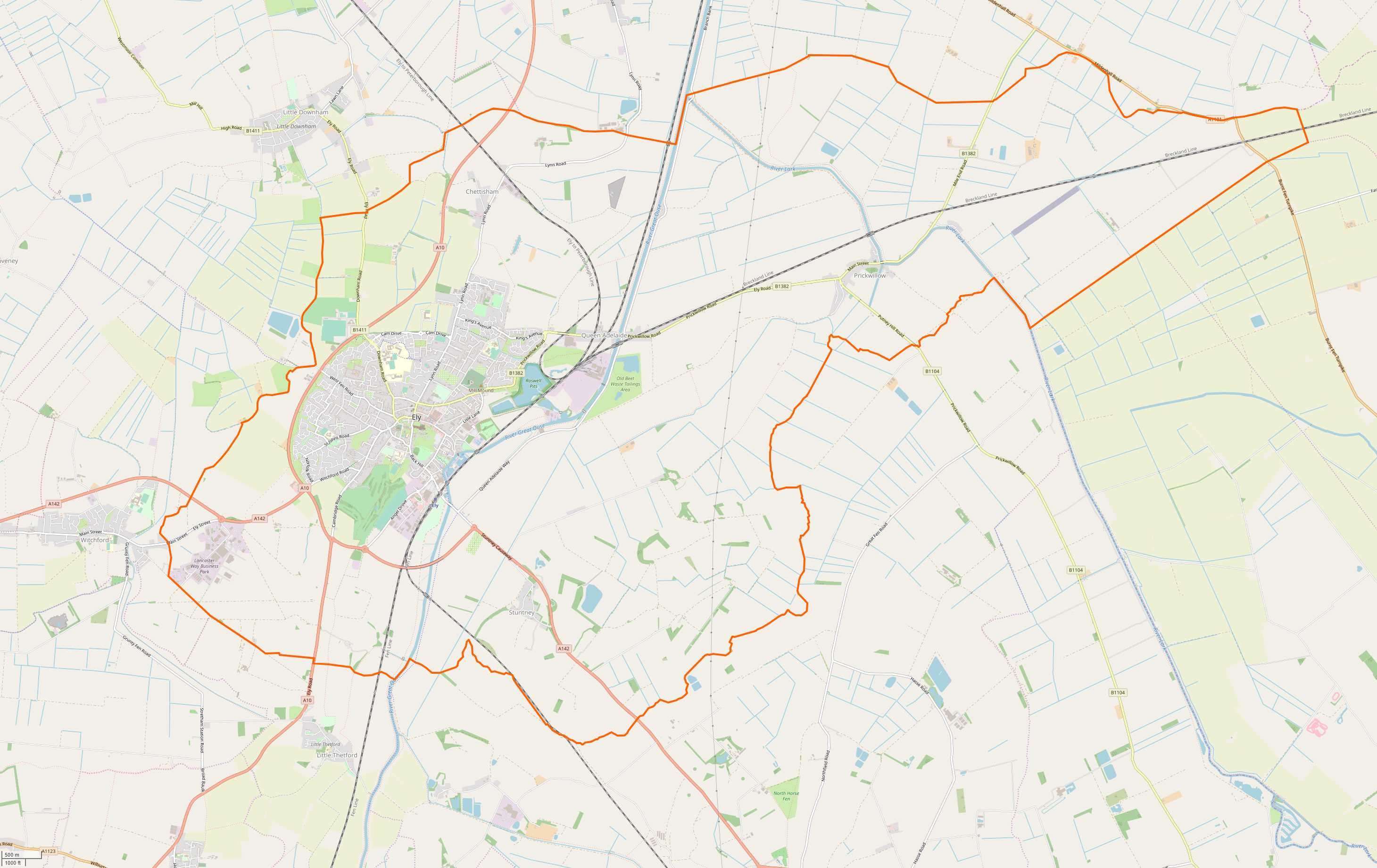
OpenMap of Ely demonstrating city boundary and environs. City/parish boundary Built-up area Countryside Greenfield land

As the seat of a diocese, Ely has long been considered a city, holding the status by ancient prescriptive right: the caption to John Speed's 1610 plan of Ely reads "Although this Citie of Ely", and Aikin refers to Ely as a city in 1800. When Ely was given a Local Board of Health by Queen Victoria in 1850, the order creating the board said it was to cover the "city of Ely". The local board which governed the city from 1850 to 1894 called itself "City of Ely Local Board", and the urban district council which replaced it and governed the city from 1894 to 1974 similarly called itself "City of Ely Urban District Council".

Ely's city status was not explicitly confirmed, however, until 1 April 1974 when Queen Elizabeth II granted letters patent, to its civil parish. Ely's population of 20,574 (as recorded in 2021) classifies it as one of the smallest cities in England; although the population has increased noticeably since 1991 when it was recorded at 11,291. Its urban area brings Ely into the ten smallest sized cities (1.84 sq mi—4.77 km^{2}), but by city council area it is much larger in coverage (22.86 sq mi—59.21 km^{2}) than many others.

== Governance ==
=== Parliamentary ===
For elections to the UK Parliament, Ely is part of the Ely and East Cambridgeshire constituency.

=== Local government ===
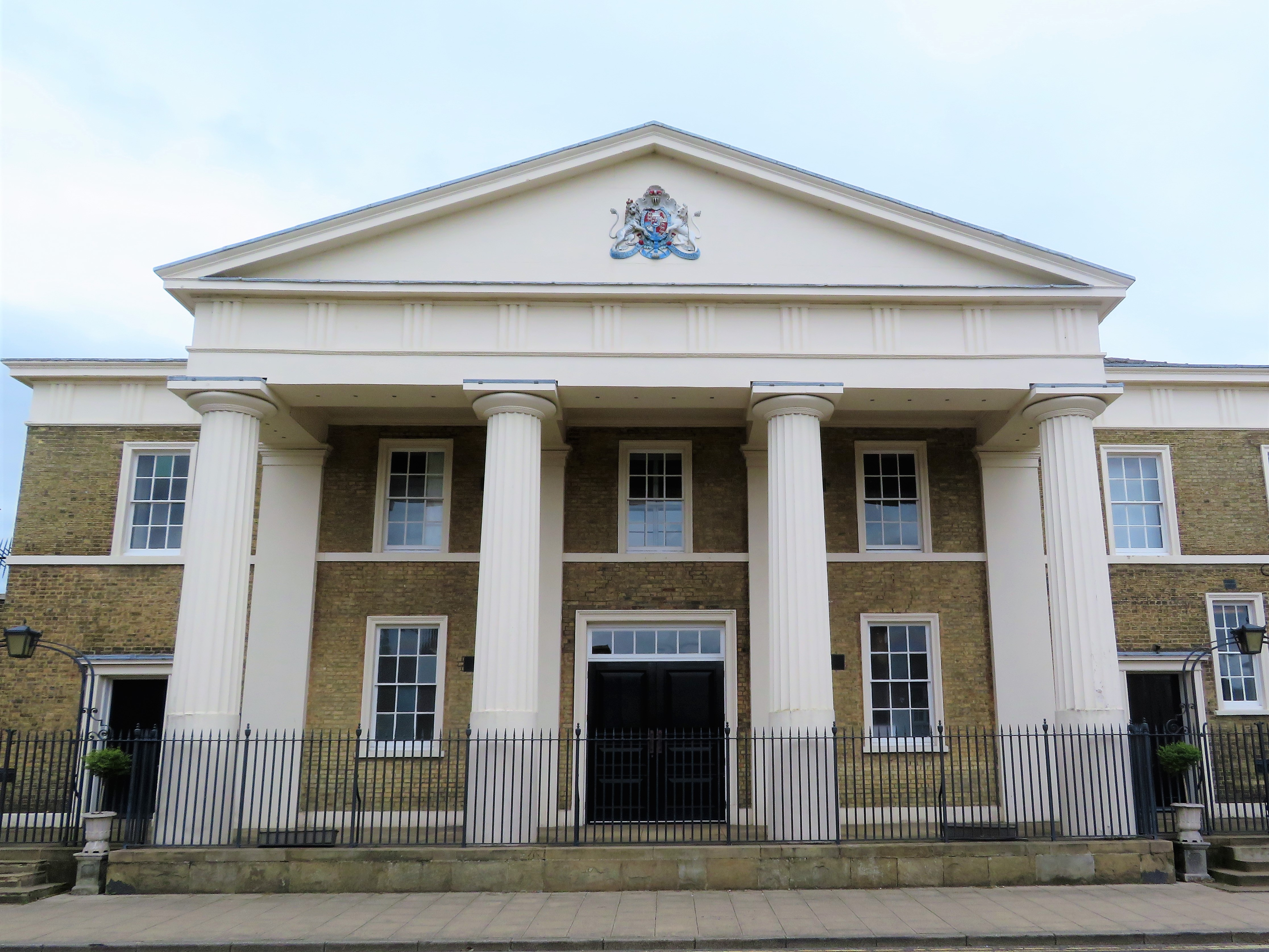
Sessions House (formerly Shire Hall), Lynn Road: Courthouse, built 1821. Since 2013 the headquarters of City of Ely Council.

There are three tiers of local government covering Ely, at parish (city), district, and county level: City of Ely Council, East Cambridgeshire District Council, and Cambridgeshire County Council.

Regular elections take place to the City of Ely Council, East Cambridgeshire District Council and Cambridgeshire County Council. The civil parish is divided into four wards called Ely North, Ely South, Ely East and Ely West. Fourteen councillors are elected to the parish council. The East Cambridgeshire District Council is also based in Ely. For elections to the East Cambridgeshire District Council the four wards of Ely South, Ely East and Ely West each return two district councillors; and Ely North returns three. For elections to the Cambridgeshire County Council the city returns two councillors.

=== Administrative history ===
The city was governed by a local board from 1850 until 1894, when it became the City of Ely Urban District Council, which then operated from 1894 to 1974. The Isle of Ely County Council governed the Isle of Ely administrative county that surrounding and included the city from 1889 to 1965. In 1965 there was a reform of local government that merged the county council with that of Cambridgeshire to form the Cambridgeshire and Isle of Ely County Council. In 1974 as part of a national reform of local government, the Cambridgeshire and Isle of Ely County Council merged with the Huntingdon and Peterborough County Council to form the Cambridgeshire County Council. The City of Ely Urban District Council became the City of Ely Council, a parish council which covers the same area but with fewer powers, and the East Cambridgeshire District Council which covers a wider area.

== Geography ==
=== Geology and topography ===
A 1648 drainage map showing the Isle of Ely still surrounded by water Joan Blaeu (1648) Regiones Inundatae

The west of Cambridgeshire is made up of limestones from the Jurassic period, whilst the east Cambridgeshire area consists of Cretaceous (upper Mesozoic) chalks known locally as clunch. In between these two major formations, the high ground forming the Isle of Ely is from a lower division Cretaceous system known as Lower Greensand which is capped by Boulder Clay; all local settlements, such as Stretham and Littleport, are on similar islands. These islands rise above the surrounding flat land which forms the largest plain of Britain (Note: "Largest ...", according to Miller and Skertchley (1878) "... by reason of its magnitude, its almost unbroken flatness, and its fertility".) from the Jurassic system of partly consolidated clays or muds. Kimmeridge Clay beds dipping gently west underlie the Lower Greensand of the area exposed, for example, about one mile (2 km) south of Ely in the Roswell Pits. The Lower Greensand is partly capped by glacial deposits forming the highest point in East Cambridgeshire, rising to 85 feet (26 m) above sea level in Ely.

The low-lying fens surrounding the island of Ely were formed, prior to the 17th century, by alternate fresh water and sea water incursions. Major rivers in the region, including the Witham, Welland, Nene and Great Ouse, drain an area of some 6,000 square miles (16,000 km^{2})—five times larger than the fens—into the basin that forms the fens. Defoe in 1774 described the Fens as "the sink of no less than thirteen Counties". On 23 November of that year, Church of England cleric and Christian theologician John Wesley, wrote of his approach to Ely after visiting Norwich: "about eight, Wednesday, 23, Mr. Dancer met me with a chaise [carriage] and carried me to Ely. Oh, what want of common sense! Water covered the high road for a mile and a half. I asked, 'How must foot-people come to the town?' 'Why, they must wade through!'" Peat formed in the fresh-water swamps and meres whilst silts were deposited by the slow-moving sea-water. Francis Russell, Earl of Bedford, supported by Parliament, financed the draining of the fens during the 17th century, led by the Dutch engineer Cornelius Vermuyden; the fens continue to be drained to this day.

=== Climate ===
With an average annual rainfall of 24 inches (600 mm), Cambridgeshire is one of the driest counties in the British Isles. Protected from the cool onshore coastal breezes east of the region, Cambridgeshire is warm in summer and cold and frosty in winter. Regional weather forecasting and historical summaries are available from the UK Met Office. The nearest Met Office weather station is Cambridge. (Note: The UK Metrology Office weather station identifier for Cambridge is NIAB) Additional local weather stations report periodic figures to the internet such as Weather Underground, Inc.

Climate data for Cambridge University Botanic Garden, (Note: Weather station is located 0.8 miles (1.3 km) from the Cambridge city centre.) elevation: 13 m (43 ft), 1991–2020 normals, extremes 1914–present
| Month | Jan | Feb | Mar | Apr | May | Jun | Jul | Aug | Sep | Oct | Nov | Dec | Year |
|---|---|---|---|---|---|---|---|---|---|---|---|---|---|
| Record high °C (°F) | 15.7 (60.3) | 18.8 (65.8) | 23.9 (75.0) | 27.9 (82.2) | 34.0 (93.2) | 35.0 (95.0) | 39.9 (103.8) | 36.9 (98.4) | 33.9 (93.0) | 29.0 (84.2) | 21.1 (70.0) | 16.0 (60.8) | 39.9 (103.8) |
| Mean daily maximum °C (°F) | 7.8 (46.0) | 8.6 (47.5) | 11.5 (52.7) | 14.6 (58.3) | 18.0 (64.4) | 20.8 (69.4) | 23.3 (73.9) | 22.9 (73.2) | 19.9 (67.8) | 15.3 (59.5) | 10.9 (51.6) | 8.1 (46.6) | 15.1 (59.2) |
| Daily mean °C (°F) | 4.8 (40.6) | 5.2 (41.4) | 7.3 (45.1) | 9.7 (49.5) | 12.8 (55.0) | 15.6 (60.1) | 17.9 (64.2) | 17.7 (63.9) | 15.0 (59.0) | 11.4 (52.5) | 7.5 (45.5) | 5.0 (41.0) | 10.8 (51.4) |
| Mean daily minimum °C (°F) | 1.7 (35.1) | 1.7 (35.1) | 3.1 (37.6) | 4.7 (40.5) | 7.5 (45.5) | 10.5 (50.9) | 12.6 (54.7) | 12.5 (54.5) | 10.2 (50.4) | 7.4 (45.3) | 4.2 (39.6) | 1.9 (35.4) | 6.5 (43.7) |
| Record low °C (°F) | −16.1 (3.0) | −17.2 (1.0) | −11.7 (10.9) | −6.1 (21.0) | −4.4 (24.1) | −0.6 (30.9) | 2.2 (36.0) | 3.3 (37.9) | −2.2 (28.0) | −6.5 (20.3) | −13.3 (8.1) | −15.6 (3.9) | −17.2 (1.0) |
| Average precipitation mm (inches) | 47.2 (1.86) | 35.9 (1.41) | 32.2 (1.27) | 36.2 (1.43) | 43.9 (1.73) | 52.3 (2.06) | 53.2 (2.09) | 57.6 (2.27) | 49.3 (1.94) | 56.5 (2.22) | 54.4 (2.14) | 49.8 (1.96) | 568.4 (22.38) |
| Average precipitation days (≥ 1.0 mm) | 10.7 | 8.9 | 8.1 | 7.9 | 7.4 | 8.7 | 8.4 | 8.7 | 8.1 | 9.5 | 10.5 | 10.3 | 107.3 |
| Average relative humidity (%) | 86.0 | 82.5 | 78.6 | 74.6 | 74.8 | 73.9 | 72.5 | 73.7 | 77.5 | 83.3 | 87.0 | 87.8 | 79.4 |
Source 1: ECA&D
Source 2: Weather.Directory

Climate data for Cambridge (NIAB) (Note: Weather station is located 3 miles (4.8 km) from the Cambridge city centre.), elevation: 26 m (85 ft), 1991–2020 normals, extremes 1959–present
| Month | Jan | Feb | Mar | Apr | May | Jun | Jul | Aug | Sep | Oct | Nov | Dec | Year |
|---|---|---|---|---|---|---|---|---|---|---|---|---|---|
| Record high °C (°F) | 15.4 (59.7) | 18.3 (64.9) | 23.9 (75.0) | 26.9 (80.4) | 33.4 (92.1) | 35.8 (96.4) | 39.9 (103.8) | 36.1 (97.0) | 32.0 (89.6) | 29.3 (84.7) | 18.3 (64.9) | 16.1 (61.0) | 39.9 (103.8) |
| Mean daily maximum °C (°F) | 7.7 (45.9) | 8.3 (46.9) | 11.0 (51.8) | 14.1 (57.4) | 17.4 (63.3) | 20.4 (68.7) | 23.1 (73.6) | 22.9 (73.2) | 19.6 (67.3) | 15.1 (59.2) | 10.7 (51.3) | 8.0 (46.4) | 14.9 (58.8) |
| Daily mean °C (°F) | 4.8 (40.6) | 5.0 (41.0) | 7.0 (44.6) | 9.4 (48.9) | 12.4 (54.3) | 15.4 (59.7) | 17.8 (64.0) | 17.7 (63.9) | 15.0 (59.0) | 11.5 (52.7) | 7.6 (45.7) | 5.1 (41.2) | 10.7 (51.3) |
| Mean daily minimum °C (°F) | 1.9 (35.4) | 1.8 (35.2) | 3.1 (37.6) | 4.6 (40.3) | 7.4 (45.3) | 10.5 (50.9) | 12.6 (54.7) | 12.6 (54.7) | 10.5 (50.9) | 7.9 (46.2) | 4.5 (40.1) | 2.2 (36.0) | 6.7 (44.1) |
| Record low °C (°F) | −16.0 (3.2) | −15.3 (4.5) | −9.4 (15.1) | −5.9 (21.4) | −1.8 (28.8) | 0.0 (32.0) | 4.8 (40.6) | 3.3 (37.9) | −0.6 (30.9) | −5.4 (22.3) | −8.9 (16.0) | −12.5 (9.5) | −16.0 (3.2) |
| Average precipitation mm (inches) | 48.6 (1.91) | 35.7 (1.41) | 32.9 (1.30) | 37.6 (1.48) | 43.2 (1.70) | 49.1 (1.93) | 48.3 (1.90) | 55.9 (2.20) | 47.6 (1.87) | 58.7 (2.31) | 52.6 (2.07) | 49.2 (1.94) | 559.4 (22.02) |
| Average precipitation days (≥ 1.0 mm) | 10.4 | 8.7 | 8.1 | 8.0 | 7.3 | 8.7 | 8.4 | 9.0 | 8.0 | 9.6 | 10.4 | 10.5 | 107.2 |
| Mean monthly sunshine hours | 57.2 | 77.8 | 118.4 | 157.2 | 182.7 | 182.5 | 190.0 | 181.3 | 144.0 | 110.3 | 67.6 | 53.7 | 1,522.7 |
Source 1: Met Office
Source 2: Starlings Roost Weather

== Demography ==
The Domesday survey of 1086 revealed 110 households which were mainly rural. In 1251, a survey showed an increase to 345 households with the start of urban living although still largely rural. By the 1416 survey there were 457 occupied premises in the city and many of the streets were arranged much as they are today. See also the cartographer John Speed's plan of Ely, 1610. In 1563 there were 800 households and by 1753 the population was recorded as 3,000.

Historical population of Ely
| Year | 1801 | 1811 | 1821 | 1831 | 1841 | 1851 | 1861 | 1871 | 1881 | 1891 | 1901 | 1911 |
|---|---|---|---|---|---|---|---|---|---|---|---|---|
| Population | 3,948 | 4,249 | 5,079 | 6,189 | 6,849 | 7,632 | 7,982 | 8,166 | 8,171 | 8,017 | 7,803 | 7,917 |
| Year | 1921 | 1931 | 1941 | 1951 | 1961 | 1971 | 1981 | 1991 | 2001 | 2011 | 2021 | 2031 |
| Population | 7,690 | 8,381 | (Note: There was no census in 1941 due to World War II) | 9,988 | 9,803 | 9,966 | 10,392 | 11,291 | 15,102 | 20,256 | ~19,200 | - |
Census: 1801–2001 2011 2021

== Economy ==
As an island surrounded by marshes and meres, the fishing of eels was important as both a food and an income for the abbot and his nearby tenants. For example, to the abbot of Ely in 1086, Stuntenei was worth 24,000 eels, Litelport 17,000 eels and even the small village of Liteltetford was worth 3,250 eels. Prior to the extensive and largely successful drainage of the fens during the seventeenth century, Ely was a trade centre for goods made out of willow, reeds and rushes and wild fowling was a major local activity. Peat in the form of "turf" was used as a fuel and in the form of "moor" as a building material. (Note: Turf is "Unweathered peat worked for fuel in 'turbaries'" and moor is "weathered peat unsuitable for fuel") Ampthill Clay was dug from the local area for the maintenance of river banks and Kimmeridge Clay at Roswell Pits for the making of pottery wares. In general, from a geological perspective, "The district is almost entirely agricultural and has always been so. The only mineral worked at the present time is gravel for aggregate, although chalk, brick clay (Ampthill and Kimmeridge clays), phosphate (from Woburn Sands, Gault and Cambridge Greensand), sand and gravel, and peat have been worked on a small scale in the past".

Phosphate nodules, referred to locally as coprolites, (Note: The word coprolite is from the Greek kopros which means dung and lithos which means stone. The word was first coined in 1829 by Rev. William Buckland and is a misnomer as the nodules are fossilised bone) were dug in the area surrounding Ely between 1850 and 1890 for use as an agricultural fertiliser. This industry provided significant employment for the local labour force. One of the largest sugar beet factories in England was opened in Queen Adelaide, two miles (3 km) from the centre of Ely, in 1925. The factory closed in 1981, although sugar beet is still farmed locally.

Pottery was made in Ely from the 12th century until 1860: records show around 80 people who classed their trade as potters. "Babylon ware" is the name given to pottery made in one area of Ely. This ware is thought to be so named because there were potters in an area cut off from the centre by the re-routing of the River Great Ouse around 1200; by the 17th century this area had become known as Babylon. Although the reason for the name is unclear, by 1850 it was in official use on maps. The building of the Ely to King's Lynn railway in 1847 cut the area off even further, and the inhabitants could only cross to Ely by boat.

== Culture ==
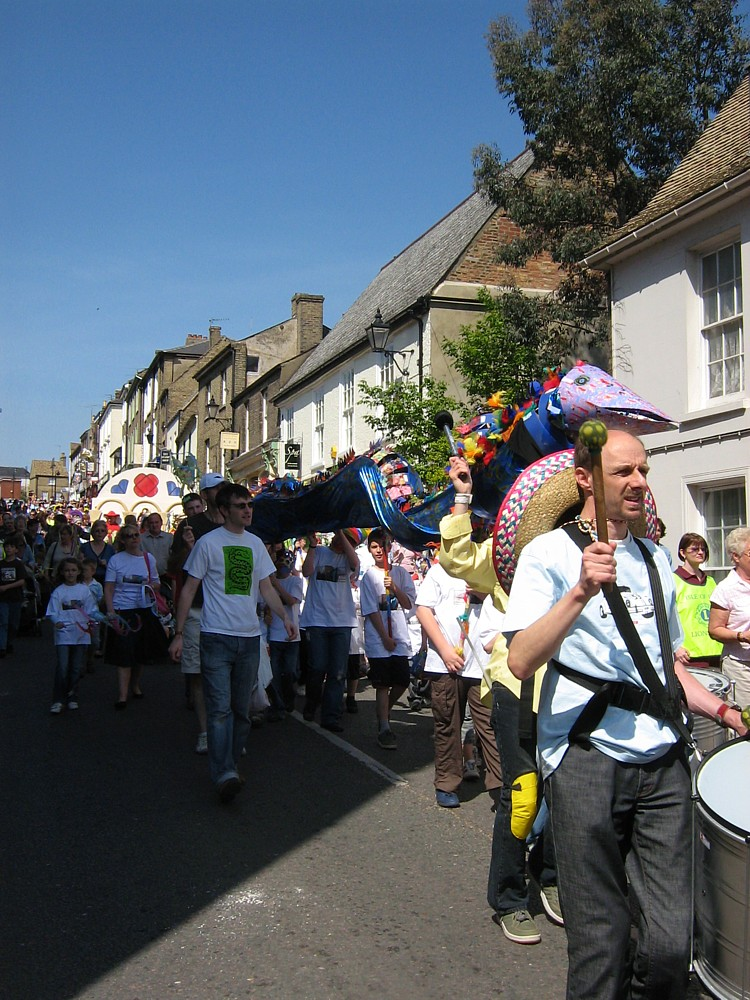
Eel Day carnival procession down Fore Hill, 2007

=== Annual events ===
Annual fairs have been held in Ely since the twelfth century. Saint Audrey's (Etheldreda's) seven-day fair, held either side of 23 June, was first granted officially by Henry I to the abbot and convent on 10 October 1189. At this fair, cheap necklaces, made from brightly coloured silk, were sold—these were called "tawdry lace". "Tawdry", a corruption of "Saint Audrey", now means "pertaining to the nature of cheap and gaudy finery". Two other fairs, the 15‑day festival of St Lambert, first granted in 1312 and the 22‑day fair beginning on the Vigil of the Ascension, first granted in 1318. The festival of St Lambert had stopped by the eighteenth century. St Etheldreda's and the Vigil of the Ascension markets still continue, although the number of days have been considerably reduced and the dates have changed.

Present-day annual events in Ely include Aquafest, which has been staged at the riverside by the Rotary Club on the first Sunday of July since 1978. (Note: "[The Aquafest has been held] annually since 1977") Other events include the Eel Day carnival procession and the annual fireworks display in Ely Park, first staged in 1974. The Ely Folk Festival has been held in the city since 1985. The Ely Horticultural Society have been staging their Great Autumn Show since 1927. In 2018 Ely hosted the "Pride" festival, celebrating LGBT and diversity. At the inaugural festival "For the Hornets" headlined and the cathedral flew the pride rainbow flag.

=== Museums and attractions ===
The city of Ely has several visitor attractions, including the Stained Glass Museum, the only museum dedicated to stained glass in the UK. The Stained Glass Museum is located inside Ely Cathedral and has a collection of stained glass from the 13th century to the present day. Ely Museum, housed in the old city gaol, is a local history museum which tells the story of Ely and the surrounding Fens from pre-historic times to the present day. Oliver Cromwell's House is the former family home of Oliver Cromwell, and houses an exhibition about Cromwell and the English Civil War.

=== Visual arts ===
Ely is home to a many artists who open their studios for visitors during Cambridge Open Studios. The Old Fire Engine House has a Gallery showing a range of contemporary artwork including work by local artists. In 2025 local artist Amy Wormald created a new piece of public art in Ely in the form of a vibrant mural adjacent to Newnham Street Car Park.

Sadly the Babylon Art Gallery, formally ADeC (Arts Development in East Cambridgeshire) closed down in 2025.

=== Twin town ===
Since September 1956, Ely has been twinned with Ribe, Denmark's oldest town and part of the Municipality of Esbjerg; officials from Ribe first came to Ely in 1957. The golden anniversary of this twinning was celebrated in 2006. Exchange visits occur roughly every two years.

=== Local media ===
Local news and television programmes are provided by BBC East and ITV Anglia. The city receives its television signals from the Sandy Heath TV transmitter.

Ely's local radio stations are BBC Radio Cambridgeshire on 96.0 FM, Heart East on 103.0 FM and Star Radio on 107.1.

Local newspapers are the Ely Standard and Cambridge News.

== Landmarks ==
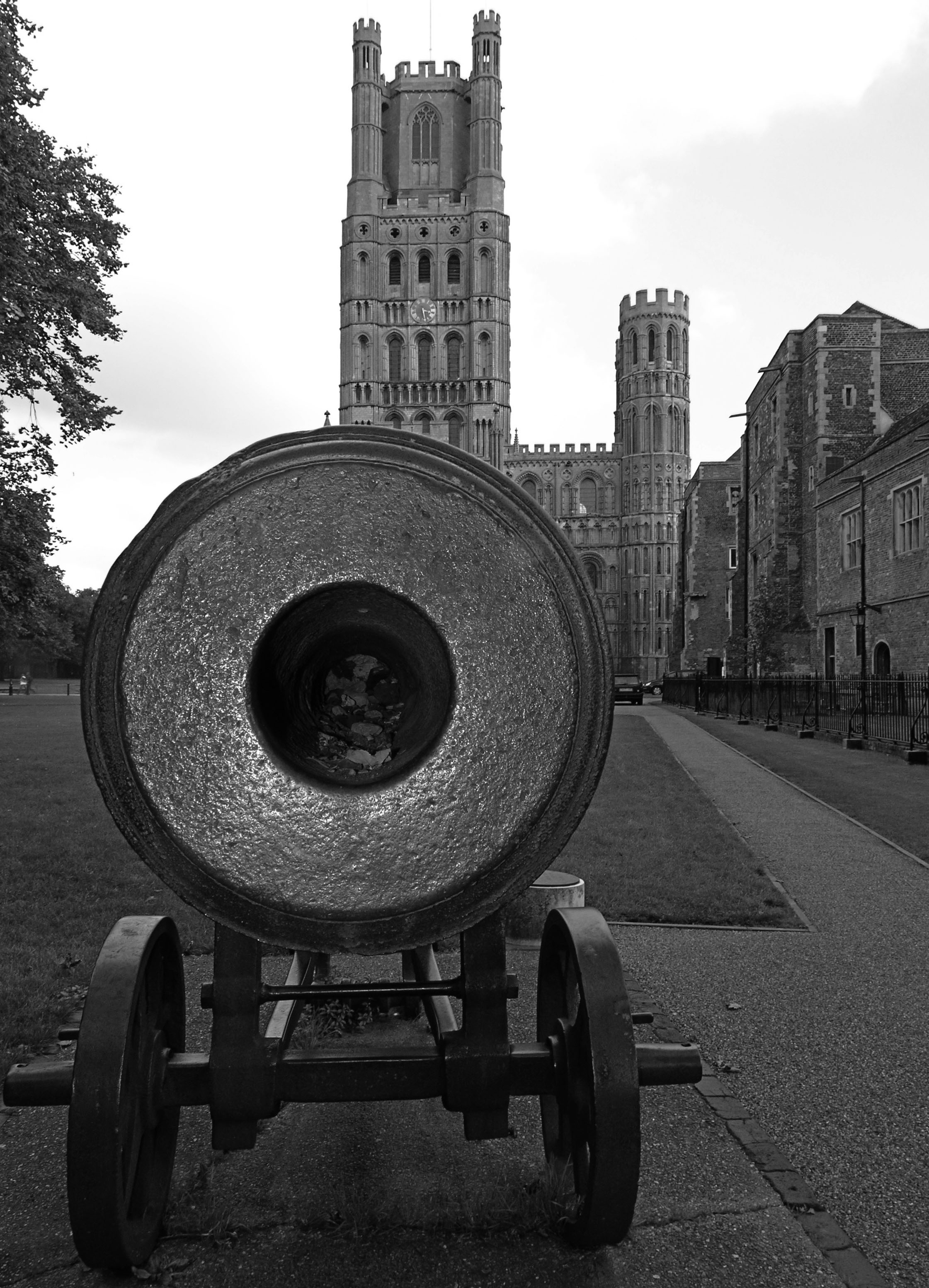
This cannon was captured during the Crimean War at the Siege of Sevastopol (1854–1855) and was presented to the people of Ely by Queen Victoria in 1860. It is located on the Palace Green west of Ely Cathedral and northwest of the Bishop's Palace.

=== War memorial ===
A cannon, captured during the Crimean War at the Siege of Sevastopol (1854–1855) and given to Ely by Queen Victoria in 1860, is located on Palace Green, west of the cathedral. The inscription reads "Russian cannon captured during the Crimean War presented to the people of Ely by Queen Victoria in 1860 to mark the creation of the Ely Rifle Volunteers". The cannon was cast (Note: Chiselled into the ends of the trunnions of the gun is the "vital data"; the serial number, name of factory and director's name on one side, and the calibre, weight and date of manufacture on the other) at the Alexandrovski factory in 1802, the factory's director being the Englishman, Charles Gascoigne. The serial number is 8726. The calibre is 30 pounds (14 kg) and the weight is 252 poods, or about 9,000 pounds (4,100 kg). The cannon is mounted on an iron carriage which would previously have been mounted on a "heavy iron traversing slide" known as 'Systeme Venglov 1853'. The Ely Rifle Volunteers, formed in 1860, became part of the Cambridgeshire Regiment during 1914–1918 then subsequently part of the Royal Anglian Regiment until disbanded in 1999.

=== Notable buildings ===
There are 23 Grade I, six Grade II* and 153 Grade II listed buildings in the city of Ely.

Cherry Hill, to the south of Cathedral Park, is the remains of the Norman period, motte and bailey, Ely Castle. The earliest written record of this 40-foot-high (12 m) by 250-foot-diameter (76 m) castle is in the time of Henry I.

Two 12th-century hospitals, St Mary Magdalene founded 1172 and St John the Baptist founded c. 1200, were on the site of what is now a four-building farmstead in West End. Building dates are not known but the extant remains indicate c. 1175–85. Bishop Northwold merged the two hospitals in 1240. The farmstead Grade I listed building status was graded on 23 September 1950 between four properties: St John's farmhouse, a barn to the southwest (formerly chapel of St John), a barn to the north (formerly chapel of St Mary) and a dovecote. Above the north doorway of the southwestern barn of St John's farmhouse is a carved Barnack stone which is built into the 13th century wall. The stone is thought to have been robbed from the Anglo-Saxon monastery of St Etheldreda. (Note: Cobbett writes "I do not claim that this stone formed part of Ethelreda's original monastery, and is of seventh century date, though this is just possible; but rather that it belonged to the monastery which she founded in 673 and was carried on by her royal sisters after her death".) This heavily weathered 8th century stone shows a man blowing a horn whilst riding on an ox.

John Alcock, Bishop of Ely and founder of Jesus College, Cambridge, constructed the Bishop's Palace during his bishopric, between 1486 and 1500; of the original fabric, only the east tower and the lower part of the west tower remain. A "startlingly huge" London Plane tree, planted in 1680, still grows in the garden and is "said to be one of the largest in England". Benjamin Lany, Bishop of Ely from 1667 until 1675, demolished much of Alcock's work and thus became responsible for most of the present-day building. This Grade I listed building is southwest of and close to the west end of the cathedral, opposite the original village green, now named Palace Green.

St Mary's Vicarage, better known locally as Cromwell's House, is a Grade II* listed building of mainly 16th century plaster-frame construction although there exist some stone arches, c. 1380. A plaque on the front of the house records that this is "Cromwell House, the residence of Oliver Cromwell from 1636 to 1647 when collector of Ely Tithes". Between 1843 and 1847 the house was the Cromwell Arms public house and it was restored in 1905 when it was given its "timbered appearance". The house was opened as a re-creation of seventeenth-century living and a tourist information centre on 6 December 1990. The former Ely Gaol is a late seventeenth-century Grade II listed building which since has been the Ely museum. From the thirteenth century, buildings on this site have been; a private house, a tavern and—since 1836 when the Bishop transferred his thirteenth-century prison from Ely Porta—the Bishop's Gaol. It was a registry office prior to becoming a museum.

The Maltings is another of Ely's distinguishing buildings. Built in 1868 as part of Ebenezer William Harlock's brewery complex, the Maltings was used to process locally grown barley into Malt for brewing. The Maltings is located on Ely's Waterside and has since left its brewing days behind. It is now a venue that hosts live events and entertainment as well as private functions such as weddings and business conferences. The Maltings is also home to the Ely-Ribe Tapestry. The Ely-Ribe Tapestry was commissioned in 2004 to mark the 50th Anniversary of the twinning of the two towns; Ely in Cambridgeshire England and Ribe in Jutland, Denmark. The designer, Ullrich described the Tapestry as "a portrait of two different cities in two different countries".

The Lamb Hotel is a Grade II listed building which is prominently situated on the corner of Lynn Road and High Street 100 yards (91 m) north of the west end of the cathedral. The hotel was erected as a coaching house on the site of the previous Lamb Inn during 1828 and 1829. At that time it had stabling for 30 horses and a lock-up for two coaches. In 1906 it had five bedrooms for the landlord, 15 rooms for lodgers, room for 15 horses and 12 vehicles. In 2007 it had 31 rooms for guests. It is claimed that an inn has existed on the site since Bishop Fordham's survey between 1416 and 1417. It is also claimed that an inn existed on the site in 1690, but no earlier.

The city's courthouse was built in 1821, being known both as Shire Hall and Sessions House. It ceased operation in 2011 as part of central government measures to close 93 magistrates' courts across England and Wales. The building was subsequently acquired by City of Ely Council in 2013 to serve as their offices and meeting place.

=== Notable sites ===
The former Kimmeridge Clay quarry Roswell Pits, one mile (1.6 km) southwest of Ely Cathedral, is now a nature reserve and Site of Special Scientific Interest (SSSI). The trees in Abbey Park were planted on Mount Hill in 1779 by James Bentham, a minor canon of Ely. Ely Castle once stood on Mount Hill, which was renamed Cherry Hill following the tree plantings by Bentham. The Chettisham Meadow SSSI is a medieval ridge and furrow grassland about 0.6 miles (1 km) north of the city centre. This site, one of the UK's best remaining examples of ridge and furrow agriculture, also contains protected species such as the Green-winged Orchid.

== Transport ==
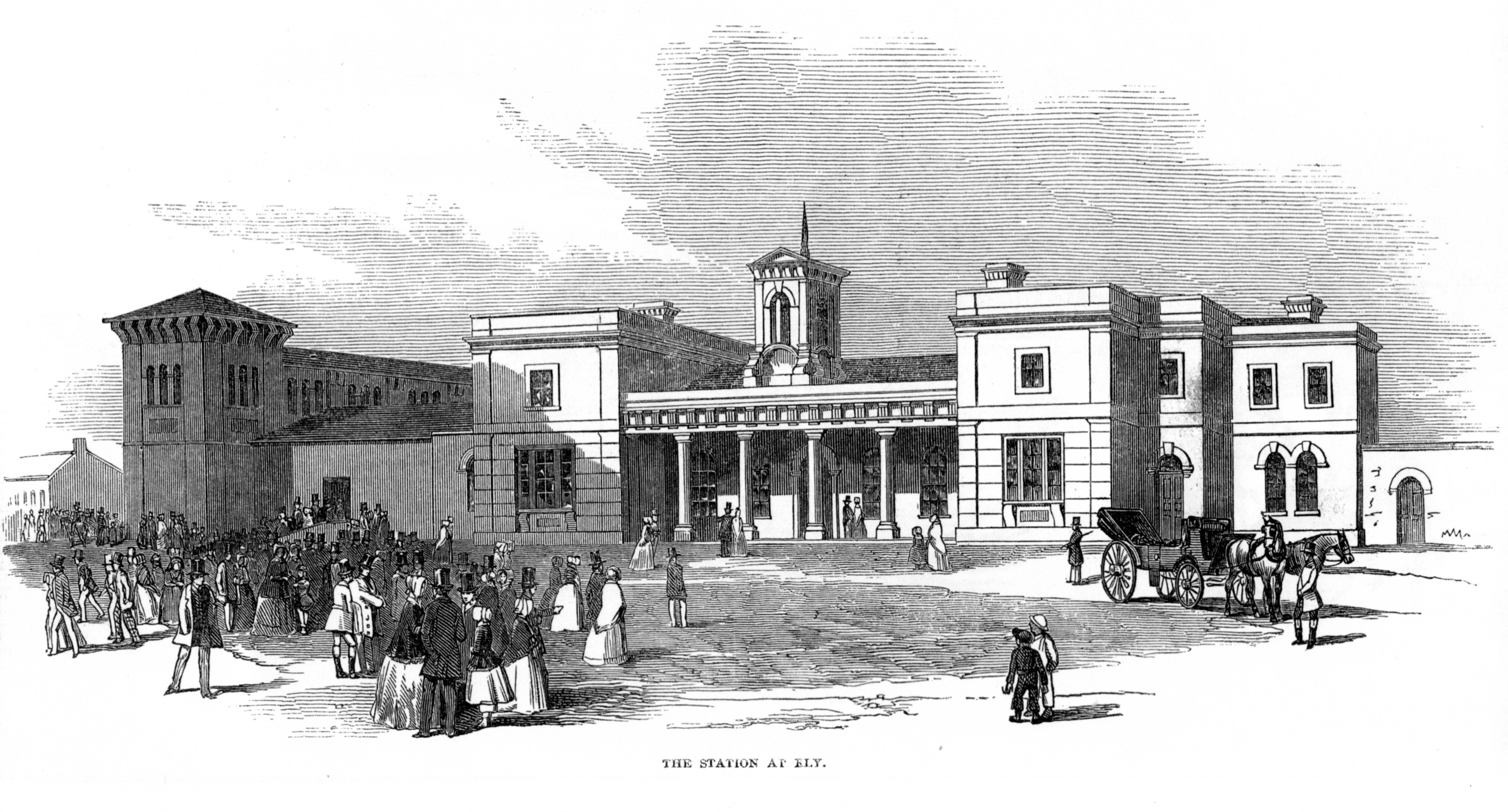
Engraving (Note: By kind permission of the Cambridgeshire Library Service) from The Illustrated London News of the station at Ely during the opening on 25 October 1847 of the Lynn and Ely Railway, now part of the Fen Line

=== Rail ===
Ely railway station, on the Fen Line, is a major railway hub, with the Cambridge to Ely section opening in 1845. Five major railway lines — excluding the former Ely and St Ives Railway — emanate from this hub: north to King's Lynn, northwest to Peterborough, east to Norwich, southeast to Ipswich and south to Cambridge and London. At the opening of the 26 1/2-mile (42.6 km) Lynn and Ely railway "with great éclat" on 25 October 1847, the Ely station building, (Note: "The present temporary Station at Ely, having been found insufficient, orders were given last Tuesday, for extensive additional buildings" Ely Chronicle 10 January 1846) completed in 1847, was described by The Illustrated London News as "an extensive pile (Note: OED pile, n. 2. a. "A large building or edifice, esp. a stately home"(subscription required)) in pleasing mixed Grecian and Italian style". The former Ely and St Ives Railway, known locally as the Grunty Fen Express, opened in 1865 but was never popular. In 1866, the 7 1/2-mile (12.1 km) return journey from Ely to Sutton-in-the-Isle cost two shillings, which equates to a cost of almost £10 (Note: Using RPI as described in Choosing the Best Indicator to Measure Relative Worth) in 2025. The line closed to passengers in February 1931 and completely closed in 1964. As of December 2016, train operating companies using Ely were: Great Northern, Greater Anglia, CrossCountry and East Midlands Railway with direct trains to Cambridge, London, most of East Anglia, the Midlands and the North. There are connecting services to many other parts of England and to Scotland.

=== Road ===
A Roman road, named Akeman Street, (Note: Dorman calls it Akerman Street) has been documented from Ermine Street near Wimpole through Cambridge, Stretham and Ely to Brancaster through Denver. This is not the same road as the major Roman road named Akeman Street which started from Verulamium (southwest of St Albans) then via Tring and Aylesbury terminating near Alchester. In Bishop John Fordham's survey of Ely in 1416–1417, an east to west Akermanstrete or Agemanstrete is mentioned, which now forms part of the east–west Egremont Street. Akeman Street would have been oriented north-south passing through central Ely and therefore the east–west oriented Egremont Street cannot have a Roman origin. It is suggested that the Wimpole to Brancaster road name of "Akeman" was derived by antiquarians, without justification, from Acemanes-ceastre, an ancient name for Bath.

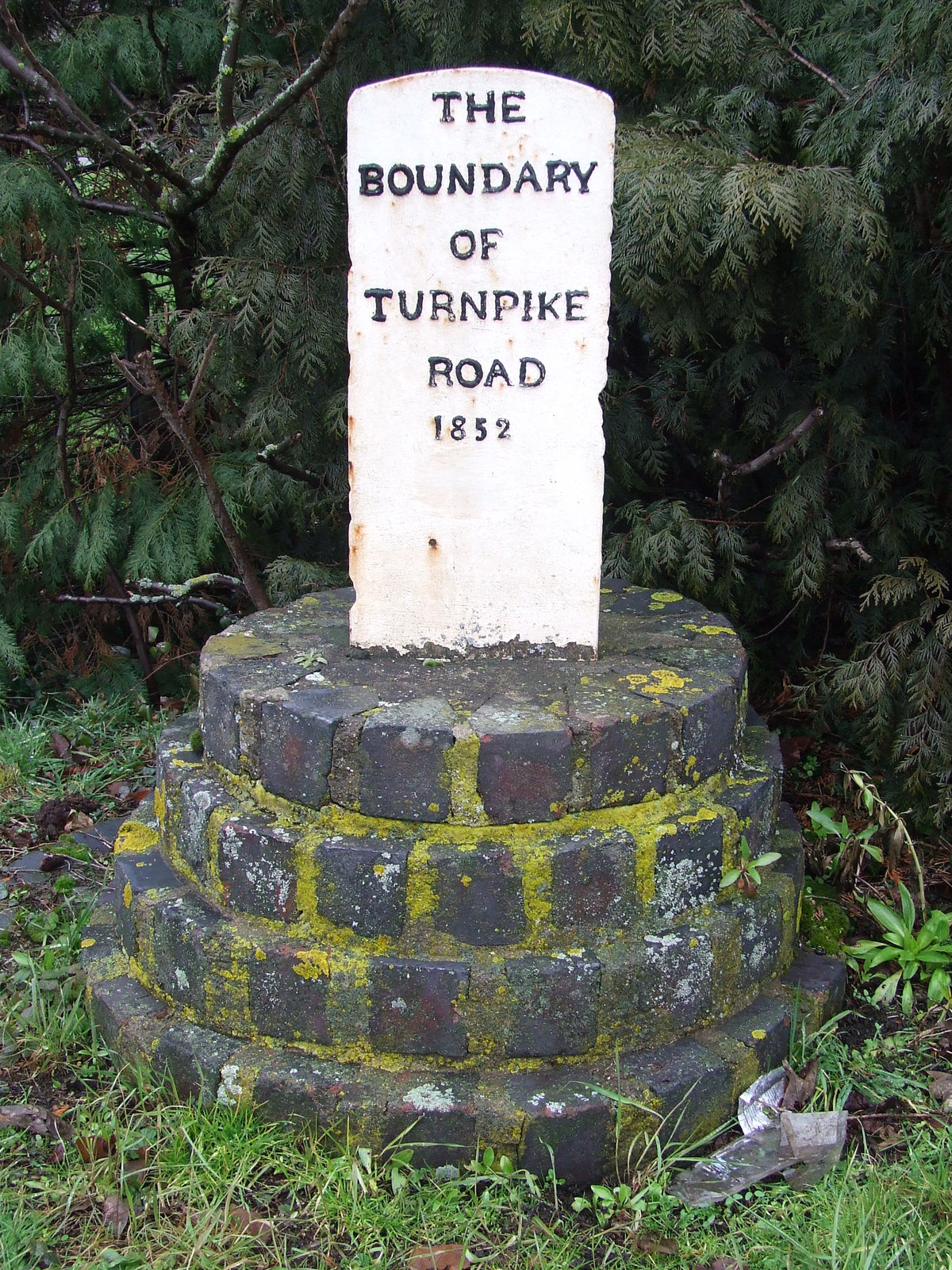
Turnpike marker 1852 showing southwest boundary of Ely

Medieval accountant, Clement of Thetford made, or had others make on his behalf, many journeys between 1291 and 1292, as evidenced by his sacrist's rolls—the earliest known roll of the Ely Monastery. For example, he travelled the 25 miles (40 km) (Note: This distance and all following medieval road distances are calculated on contemporary roads using Google Maps) to Bury (Bury St Edmunds) fair to obtain rice, sugar, etc., the 16 miles (26 km) to Barnwell for wheels, axles, etc. for carts, then the 51 miles (82 km) to St Botolph's (Boston) for wine, the 14 miles (23 km) to Reche (Reach) for steel and iron and the 78 miles (126 km) to London, principally for things needed in the vestry for the service of the Church, but also to pay taxes. Some or parts of these journeys will have been made by river.

The 18th-century historian Edmund Carter, in his 1753 History of the County of Cambridge &c., described a thrice-weekly coach journey "for the conveniency of sending and receiving letters and small parcels" from the Lamb Inn, Ely to the post-house, Cambridge. In the 1760s, the Reverend James Bentham, an antiquarian and minor canon of Ely, encouraged the ecclesiastical authorities and townspeople of Ely to subscribe (Note: "An Act for repairing, widening, turning and keeping in Repair, the Road from the Town of Cambridge to Ely, and from thence to Soham; and for building a Bridge cross the River Ouze, at or near a Place called Stretham Ferry, in the County of Cambridge") to a turnpike road between Ely and Cambridge; improvements which started in 1769. The eighteenth century London to King's Lynn coach route, documented by the Postmaster General's surveyor, John Cary, passed through Ely with a stop at the Lamb Inn, a coaching inn in 1753 and extant as the Lamb Hotel. Cary measured the distance of the London (Shoreditch) to Ely section as being 67 miles (108 km). The A142 road from Newmarket to Chatteris passes to the south of the town.

Ely is on the north-south A10 road from London to King's Lynn; the southwestern bypass of the town was built in 1986. A proposal for an Ely southeast bypass of the A142 is included in the major schemes of the Cambridgeshire Local Transport Plan. The proposed route would include 1.2 miles (1.9 km) of new road between new roundabout junctions on Stuntney Causeway and Angel Drove. The bypass is intended to reduce congestion in Ely, and to avoid the low bridge on the Ely to King's Lynn railway line, which has the third highest vehicle strike rate in the country. Proposals for the bypass went to public consultation in October 2011 and the county council and district council announced that they may fund some of the costs of construction (estimated to be up to £28 million) with contributions from developers who wish to build a retail park near the proposed route.

The bypass, completed at £13m over budget, opened on 31 October 2018.

=== River ===
The local rivers were historically important transport links but are now mainly used for leisure. The Great Ouse provides a link to the sea at King's Lynn, and the River Cam flows from Cambridge to join the Great Ouse to the south of Ely. King Cnut arrived at Ely by boat for the Purification of St Mary; "When they were approaching land [at Ely], the king rose up in the middle of his men and directed the boatmen to make for the little port (Note: Here Fairweather postulates that in the 10th century it may have been possible to "row considerably nearer to the monastery" than is possible today) at full speed". Archaeological excavations in the year 2000, between Broad Street and the present river, revealed artificially cut channels "at right-angles to the present river front" thus "evidently part of the medieval port of Ely". In 1753, Carter reports that "for the conveniency of passengers, and heavy goods to and from Cambridge" a boat left Ely every Tuesday and Friday for Cambridge; the 20-mile (32 km) journey took six hours.

== Religious sites ==
=== Ely Cathedral ===
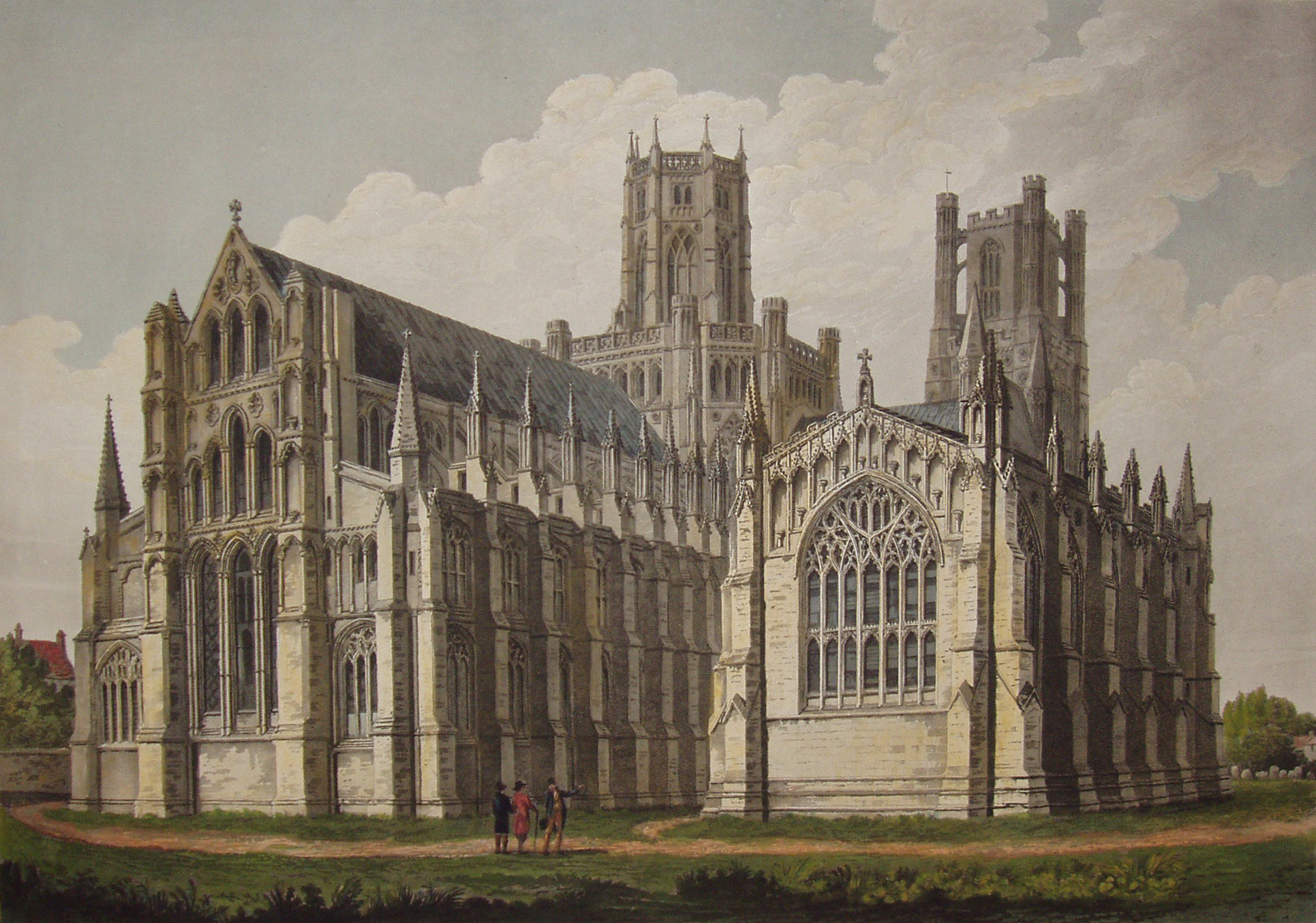
Northeast aspect of Ely Cathedral. The Lady Chapel, built between 1335 and 1353, is to the right of the image. Early 19th-century proof-print by John Buckler.

The Anglican Cathedral Church of the Holy and Undivided Trinity is known as the Ship of the Fens, a name inspired by the distant views of its towers, which dominate the low-lying wetlands known as "The Fens". The diocese of Ely was created in 1108 out of the see of Lincoln, and a year later the bishopric of Ely was founded. Construction of the cathedral was begun by William the Conqueror in 1083, with it finally opening in 1189 after 116 years. On 22 February 1322 it suffered the collapse of the crossing, which was rebuilt as an octagon. The cathedral was completed in 1351. John Wesley wrote of his 22 November 1774 visit to Ely that "the cathedral, [is] one of the most beautiful I have seen. The western tower is exceedingly grand, and the nave of an amazing height".

Ely is the nearest cathedral city to Cambridge, which lies within the same diocese. The Diocese of Ely covers 1,507 square miles (3,903 km^{2}), 641,000 people (2011) and 335 churches. It includes the county of Cambridgeshire, except for much of Peterborough, and three parishes in the south which are in the diocese of Chelmsford. The Diocese of Ely also includes the western part of Norfolk, a few parishes in Peterborough and Essex, and one in Bedfordshire.

=== Other churches ===
St Mary's Church, dedicated by Bishop Eustace, is an early thirteenth-century building with a c. 1300 spire and tower with eight bells. The church was heavily restored starting in 1877. The Roman Catholic Church of St. Etheldreda, in Egremont Street, dates from 1891. The Methodist chapel, in Chapel Street, was built in 1818 and was restored in 1891. The Salem Baptist chapel was erected in 1840. The Church of St Peter-in-Ely on Broad Street was built in 1890; the architect was James Piers St Aubyn and it contains a fine Ninian Comper rood screen. The Countess Free Church is part of the Countess of Huntingdon's Connexion. From 1566 to 1938 the parish church for Holy Trinity was the Lady Chapel of Ely Cathedral.

== Sport ==
Ely City Football Club was established in 1885 by members of Ely St. Etheldreda Football and Cricket Club. It joined the Eastern Counties Football League in 1960, and have been members of the league's Premier Division since 2007. In the 1997–1998 season, they reached the third round of the FA Vase. Ely Tigers Rugby Club currently play in the London 3: Eastern Counties Division. A short lived greyhound racing track was opened in May 1933 at the Downham Road Stadium. The racing was independent of the National Greyhound Racing Club.

The University of Cambridge rowing club has a boathouse on the bank of the river, and trains there for the annual Boat Race against the University of Oxford. In 1944 and 2021, the Boat Race took place on a course on the Great Ouse on the outskirts of Ely, moved from the River Thames due to World War II and the COVID-19 pandemic, respectively. The Isle of Ely Rowing Club was formed to commemorate the 60th anniversary of the former event.

In 1973, Ely won the international Jeux Sans Frontières competition (known in Britain as It's a Knockout!), becoming the last British town to win the title outright.

== Education ==
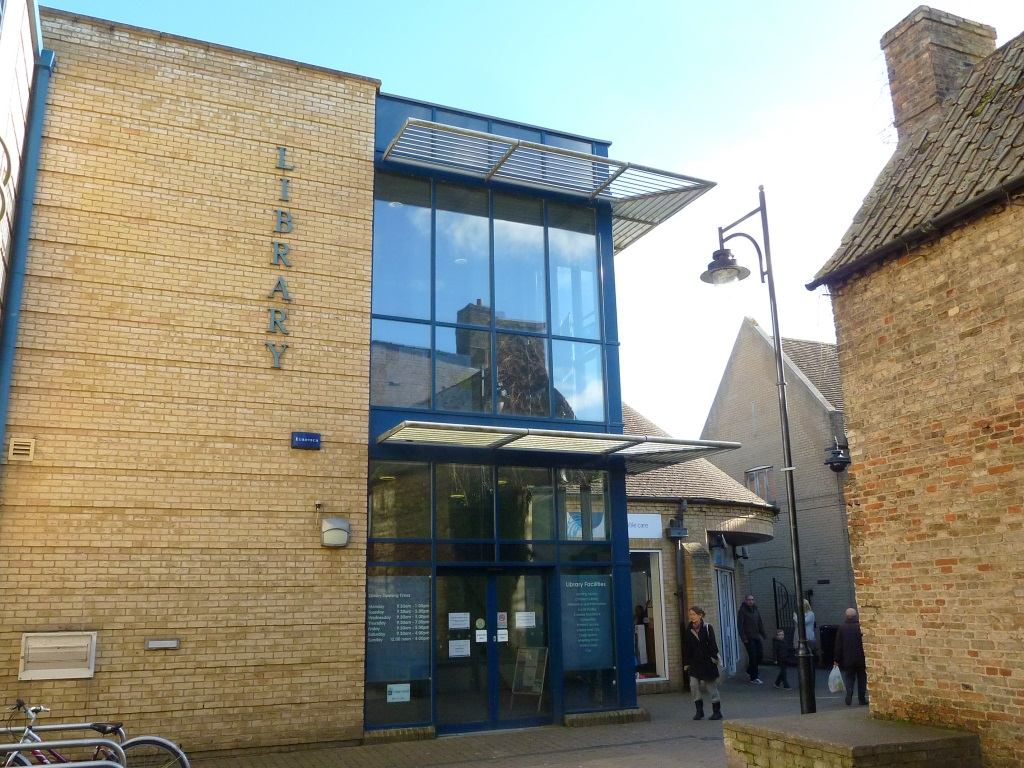
Ely Library

King's Ely is a coeducational boarding school which was granted a royal charter in 1541 by Henry VIII. King's Ely claims to have beginnings in the re-foundation of St Etheldreda's monastery in 970 by the Benedictine order. The wealthy sent their sons to such places to learn how to read and translate Latin texts. Edward the Confessor may (Note: Fairweather (2005) p. 191 note 418 "This detail about the upbringing of Edward is not attested anywhere else. See F. Barlow, Edward the Confessor (second edition, Newhaven and London 1997), pp. 28ff.") have been educated at Ely between c. 1005 and 1010. "The teaching of grammar continued in the cloisters [of Ely] and this tradition was the forerunner of the Cathedral Grammar School, today known as The King's School Ely".

Needham's Charity School was founded in 1740 in Back Hill by Mrs Catherine Needham "for the education, clothing and apprenticement of poor children". There were originally 24 free scholars aged 9 to 14 years of age. After a period in St Mary's Street, Needham's School relocated to a new building in Downham Road adjacent to Ely High School in 1969. The original building on Back Hill is now part of King's Ely.

The National School for boys was located in Silver Street. There was a National School for Girls in Market Street. Both National Schools received bursaries from the Parson's Charity. The Broad Street School was erected in 1858. In later years the Silver Street and Broad Street schools operated as St Mary's Junior School with one year group (Y5) in Broad Street.

The Ely High School for Girls opened in 1905 in St. Mary's Street, moving to the Downham Road site in 1957 on a large site which also housed St Audrey's Infant School which opened on 15 May 1953. In 1972 Ely High School closed when state secondary education in the area changed to the comprehensive model, the site becoming the City of Ely VIth Form College, part of Ely Community College which is currently Ely College.

In 1940 the Bishop's Palace was acquired by the Red Cross as a hospital and after the Second World War it became a school, known as The Palace School, for disabled children and young people.

Education in Ely, as of 2017, includes: King's Ely; Ely College; The Lantern Community Primary School; St Mary's CofE Junior School; Isle of Ely Primary School; St John's Community Primary School and Highfield Special Academy.

== Public services ==
Anglian Water supplies the city's water and sewerage services from their Ely Public Water Supply. (Note: zone FE33) The water quality was reported as excellent in 2011. In the same report, the hardness was reported as 292 mg/L. The nearest reservoir, Grafham Water, is 21 miles (34 km) west of the city.

The distribution network operator for electricity is EDF Energy. The largest straw-burning power station in the world is at nearby Sutton. This renewable energy resource power station rated at 36.85 MW from burning biomass, nearly 25 percent of the total renewable energy reported for Cambridgeshire in 2009.

East Cambridgeshire District Council is part of the Recycling in Cambridgeshire and Peterborough (RECAP) Partnership, which was granted Beacon status for waste and recycling in 2006–07.

The Princess of Wales Hospital in the north of Ely was built during the Second World War by the Royal Air Force, and until 1993 it served nearby RAF stations including Marham, Feltwell, Lakenheath, and Mildenhall. in 1987 Diana, Princess of Wales renamed the hospital, and it is now a community hospital operated by the Lifespan Healthcare NHS trust which treats 40,000 outpatients per year. Acute cases are handled by four other hospitals in the region, including Addenbrooke's Hospital and Papworth Hospital in Cambridge, 20 miles (32 km) south of Ely.

== Notable people ==
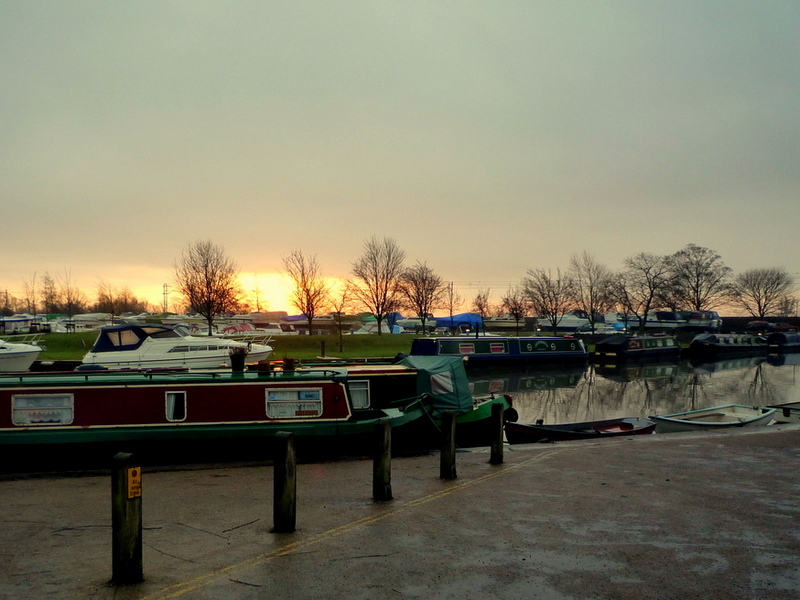
Dawn by the River Great Ouse, Ely

The former RAF hospital based in Ely meant that many children of serving RAF parents were born in the city, including rugby union player and Rugby World Cup 2003 winning manager with England national rugby team, Clive Woodward, Australian émigrée actor Guy Pearce, and actors Sam Callis, Simon MacCorkindale and David Westhead. Autogyro world record-holder Ken Wallis was also born in Ely. Other notable people from Ely include The Sisters of Mercy singer Andrew Eldritch, journalist Chris Hunt, nurse Margaret Tebbit who was severely injured in the Brighton hotel bombing in 1987, as well as crime writer Jim Kelly and award-winning poet Wendy Cope.

== In popular culture ==
Children's book Tom's Midnight Garden by Philippa Pearce is partly set in Ely and includes a scene in Ely Cathedral and scenes inspired by the author's father's own childhood experiences of skating along the frozen river from Cambridge to Ely in the frost of 1894–95. The first series of Jim Kelly's crime novels, featuring journalist Philip Dryden, is largely set in the author's home town of Ely and in the Fens. Graham Swift's 1983 novel Waterland takes place, and recounts several historical events, in and around Ely.

The Tales of the Unexpected episode "The Flypaper" was filmed in Ely.

The 2023 film Maestro has scenes filmed in Ely, including within the Ely Cathedral.

The album cover for Pink Floyd's The Division Bell was created by Storm Thorgerson with Ely as the background between two massive sculptures that he had erected outside the city.

== Freedom of the City ==
The following people and military units have received the Freedom of the City of Ely.

=== Individuals ===
- Malcolm Fletcher, saxophonist with the Ely Military Band: 18 December 2017.

=== Military units ===
- RAF Hospital Ely, 1977
- RAF Strike Command: 26 September 1987.
- 6th Battalion The Royal Anglian Regiment: 1977.
- 1094 (City of Ely) Squadron Air Training Corps: 8 October 2019
- (City of Ely Detachment) 3 (Ironside) Company Cambridgeshire Army Cadet Force: 24 June 2023.

== See also ==
- List of places in Cambridgeshire
