= Ely Castle =

Castle in Ely, Cambridgeshire, England

Coordinates: 52.39543°N 0.26337°E

Ely Castle was in the cathedral city of Ely in Cambridgeshire (grid reference TL541799). Its probable site is a mound near the cathedral which is now called Cherry Hill.

== History ==
This was a motte and bailey castle built by William I in 1070 in his conflict with Hereward the Wake to subdue the Isle of Ely. Once Ely was quiescent the motte was abandoned. However it was refortified in 1140 during the Anarchy by Bishop Nigel but surrendered to King Stephen. In 1143 Geoffrey de Mandeville was placed in charge of the castle. A castle in Ely was said to have been taken and destroyed by Falkes de Breauté in 1216. During the Second Barons' War half a century later, Ely with its fortifications was captured in 1268. It is thought that the castle built by Bishop Nigel was demolished soon afterwards.

There are no visible remains other than the mound. However, there was a considerable amount of evidence uncovered in 2002, after excavations on the site took place. The dig revealed large quantities of clay items, including jugs, and bowls that would have been used in everyday Norman life. Farming and hunting tools were also found, including those made of bronze, which archaeologist's suggest date from the transition from Viking to Norman settlement after 1066. In addition, significant amounts of clay, which was often used to cover the surface of the Motte, were found in the excavations. The town council lacked funding to expand the search further, and the site was abandoned in early 2003. The findings of the dig can now be found in Ely Museum along with other significant findings from the area.

== See also ==
- Castles in Great Britain and Ireland
- List of castles in England
