= Ely Eel Day =

Annual celebration in Ely, Cambridgeshire, UK

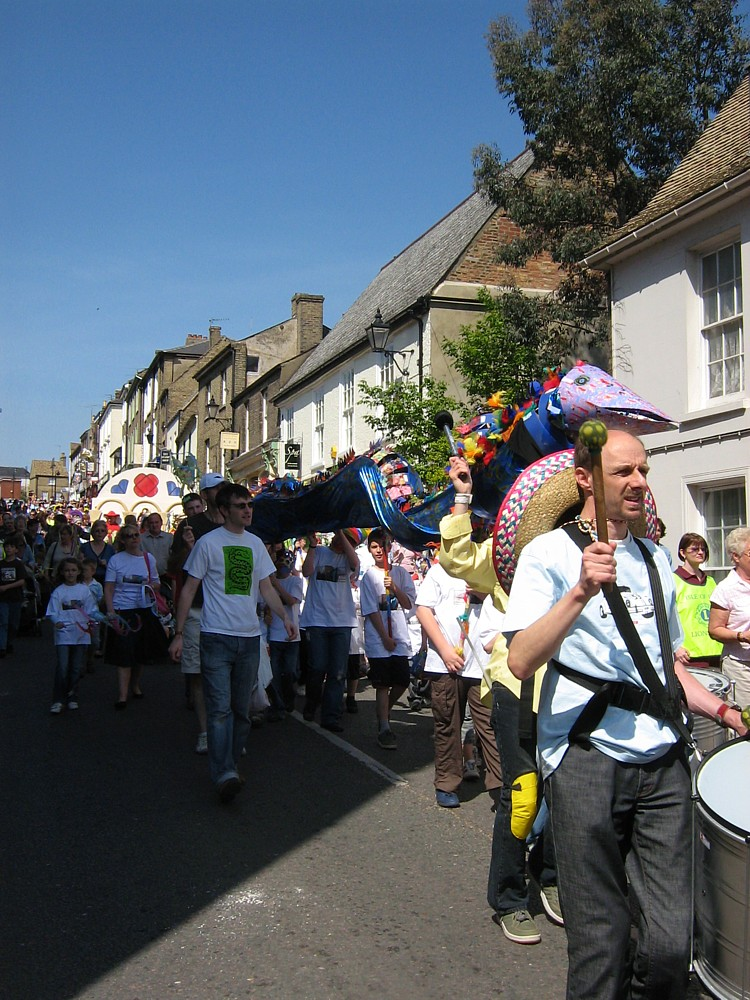
- Also called: Eel Festival Weekend
- Observed by: Inhabitants of Ely
- Type: Cultural, Historical
- Celebrations: parade, eel throwing competition
- Frequency: annual

Ely Eel Day is an annual celebration observed by the people of Ely, Cambridgeshire to celebrate the city's namesake — the eel. The celebrations start with a parade which begins from Cross Green outside Ely Cathedral and proceeds through the city to the Jubilee Gardens, passing by the Market Square and along the River Great Ouse at Ely's Waterside.

The celebrations following the parade include an eel throwing competition. The competition does not use real eels. Originally competitors were given socks rolled into some tights with rice in the end to weight it down but now the competition uses specially made toy eels. Other events on Eel Day include an annual competition for Town Criers.

Eel Day is traditionally held on the Saturday of the May Bank Holiday weekend.
