= Princess of Wales Hospital, Ely =

Princess of Wales Hospital
- Cambridgeshire and Peterborough NHS Foundation Trust
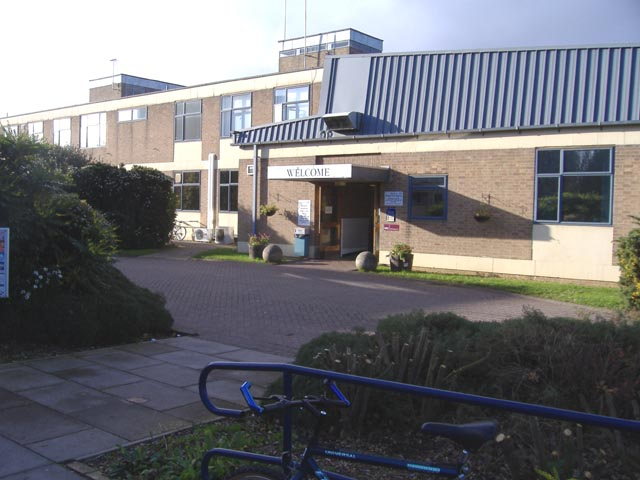
- Princess of Wales Hospital

- Location in Cambridgeshire

Geography
- Location: Ely, Cambridgeshire, England
- Coordinates: 52.4132°N 0.2755°E

Organisation
- Care system: NHS
- Type: Community

History
- Founded: 1939

Links
- Website: www.cpft.nhs.uk

The Princess of Wales Hospital is a healthcare facility in Ely, Cambridgeshire. It is managed by the Cambridgeshire and Peterborough NHS Foundation Trust.

== History ==
The facility was established as the Royal Air Force Hospital Ely in 1939. It treated military casualties during the Second World War. It joined the National Health Service in 1948 and, following a visit by the Princess of Wales in 1987, it was renamed the Princess of Wales Royal Air Force Hospital. Despite a decision by the Royal Air Force to close the facility in 1992, it was saved from closure as a result of pressure from Action for a Community Hospital in Ely, a local pressure group. It was subsequently managed on a civilian basis and renamed the Princess of Wales Hospital.
