= Dagger in the Library =

British annual award for crime fiction

The Dagger in the Library (Golden Handcuffs in 1992–1994) is an annual award given by the British Crime Writers' Association to a particular "living author who has given the most pleasure to readers". Yearly shortlists are drawn up of the ten authors most nominated, online, by readers, and the final decision is made by a panel of librarians. It was sponsored by Random House until 2015.

== Winners ==
=== 2020s ===
- 2025 – Richard Osman
- 2024 – Anthony Horowitz
- 2023 – Sophie Hannah
- 2022 – Mark Billingham
- 2021 – Peter May
- 2020 – Christopher Brookmyre

=== 2010s ===
- 2019 – Kate Ellis
- 2018 – Martin Edwards
- 2017 – Mari Hannah
- 2016 – Elly Griffiths
- 2015 – Christopher Fowler
- 2014 – Sharon Bolton
- 2013 – Belinda Bauer
- 2012 – Steve Mosby
- 2011 – Mo Hayder
- 2010 – Ariana Franklin

=== 2000s ===
- 2009 – Colin Cotterill
- 2008 – Craig Russell
- 2007 – Stuart MacBride
- 2006 – Jim Kelly
- 2005 – Jake Arnott
- 2004 – Alexander McCall Smith
- 2003 – Stephen Booth
- 2002 – Peter Robinson
- 2000 – 2001 – in abeyance

=== 1990s ===
- 1997 – 1999 – in abeyance
- 1996 – Marian Babson
- 1995 – Lindsey Davis
- 1994 – Robert Barnard
- 1993 – Margaret Yorke
- 1992 – Catherine Aird
