= Oliver Cromwell's House =

House in Ely, Cambridgeshire, England

Coordinates: 52.3988°N 0.2591°E

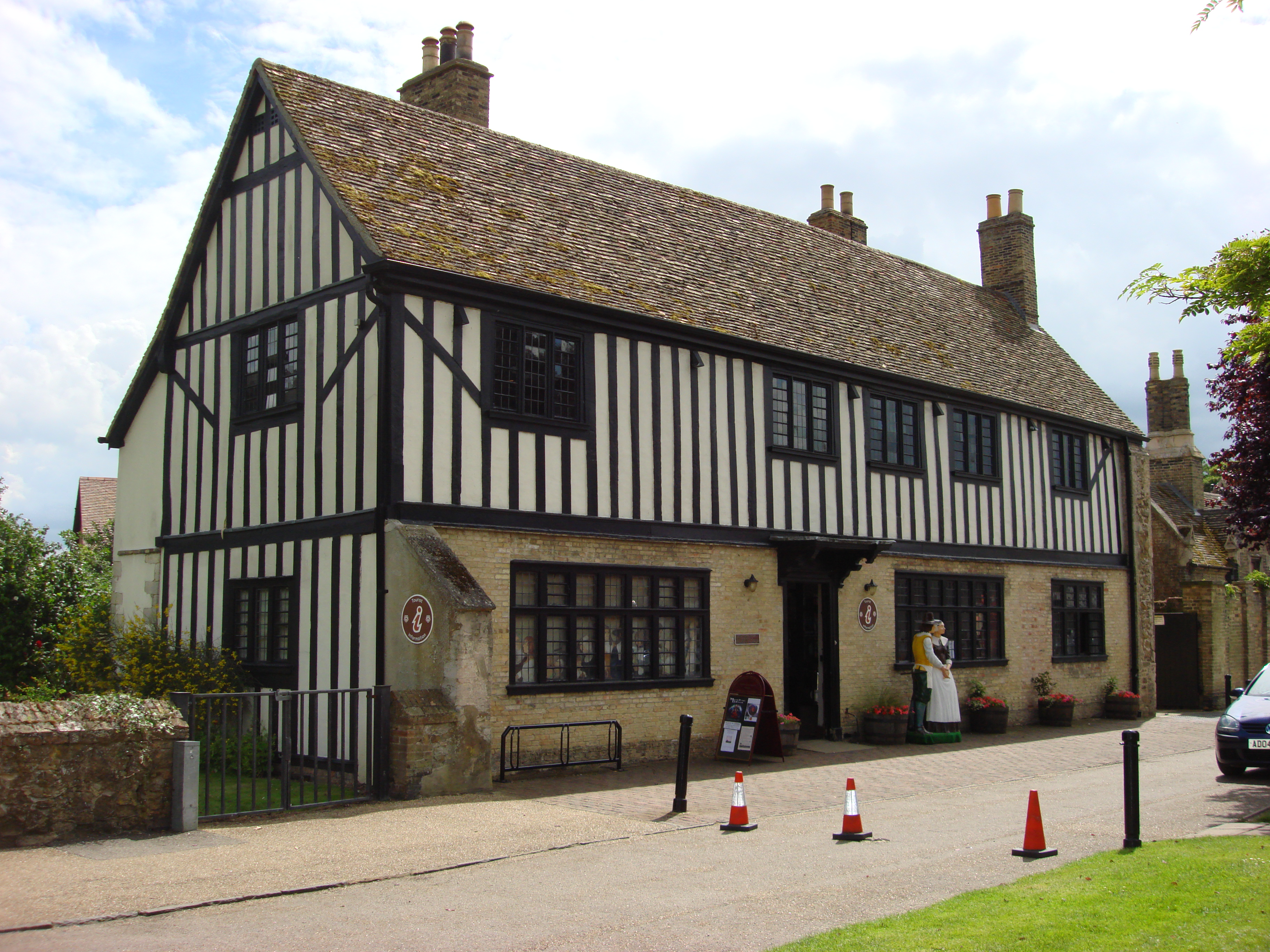
Cromwell's House, Ely (June 2007)

Oliver Cromwell's House in Ely, Cambridgeshire, England was the family home of Oliver Cromwell. The kitchen dates from around 1215, other parts being built later. The house was the vicarage of St Mary's Church (which is adjacent to it) until 1986. In 1988 it was bought by the City of Ely Council and was opened as a tourist attraction in 1990, and has been refurbished to show how it may have looked during Cromwell's lifetime.

Following a 2019 refurbishment, the house featured a Civil War exhibition with interactive displays and interpretations.
