= Ely Urban District =

Former local government area in the UK

Coordinates: 52.40098°N 0.26318°E

Ely
- Local Board District (1850-1894); Urban District (1894-1974)
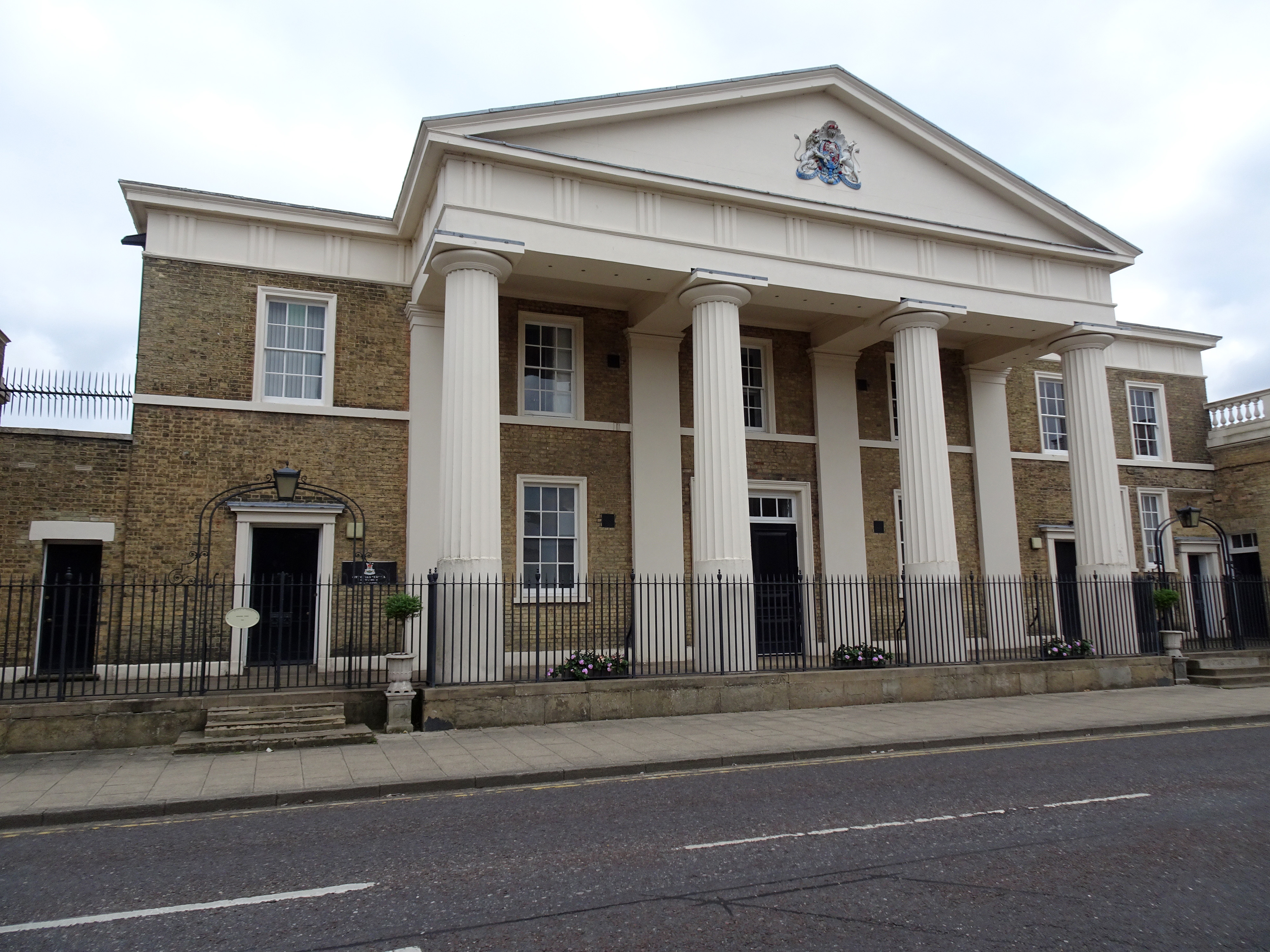
- Shire Hall, Lynn Road: Council's meeting place 1850 to 1940s
- Area
  - 1911: 16,742 acres (67.8 km^{2})
  - 1961: 14,659 acres (59.3 km^{2})
- Population
  - 1891: 8,017
  - 1971: 9,165
- History
  - Created: 15 July 1850 (Local Board District); 31 December 1894 (Urban District)
  - Abolished: 31 March 1974
  - Succeeded by: East Cambridgeshire

The city of Ely formed a local government district in the Isle of Ely and Cambridgeshire from 1850 to 1974. It was administered as a local board district from 1850 to 1894, and as an urban district from 1894 to 1974. Unusually for somewhere which claimed city status, Ely was not a municipal borough.

== History ==
Ely was declared to be a local board district on 15 July 1850, covering the two parishes of Ely Holy Trinty and Ely St Mary, plus the unparished area known as Ely College which surrounded the cathedral. The order creating the local board described the district as the "city of Ely", and the new body called itself the "City of Ely Local Board". The district also included a detached area of land in the Fens, some 5 miles (8.0 km) west of the city, known as Witcham Gravel. After elections, the local board held its first meeting on 11 October 1850 at the Shire Hall on Lynn Road in Ely, which was also known as Sessions House and was primarily used as a courthouse. George Peacock, dean of Ely Cathedral, was appointed the first chairman of the board.

The Ely Local Board District formed part of the Isle of Ely, a liberty within Cambridgeshire with its own quarter sessions, which became a separate administrative county when county councils were established in 1889. The new county council chose to base itself in March, unlike the quarter sessions it replaced, which had met alternately at Wisbech and at the Shire Hall in Ely.

Under the Local Government Act 1894, local board districts became urban districts on 31 December 1894. Ely Urban District Council held its first meeting on 8 January 1895, when Charles Bidwell was appointed the first chairman of the council. He ran the firm of Bidwells, and had been chairman of the old local board since 1888. The urban district council continued to meet at Shire Hall, as the local board had done. The council called itself the "City of Ely Urban District Council".

In 1912 the council built a fire station at 6 Lynn Road, immediately south of Shire Hall.

The parishes within the urban district were simplified in 1933, when the detached area at Witcham Gravel was transferred to the parish of Witcham and the two parishes of Holy Trinity and St Mary merged to form a single parish called Ely Holy Trinity and St Mary.

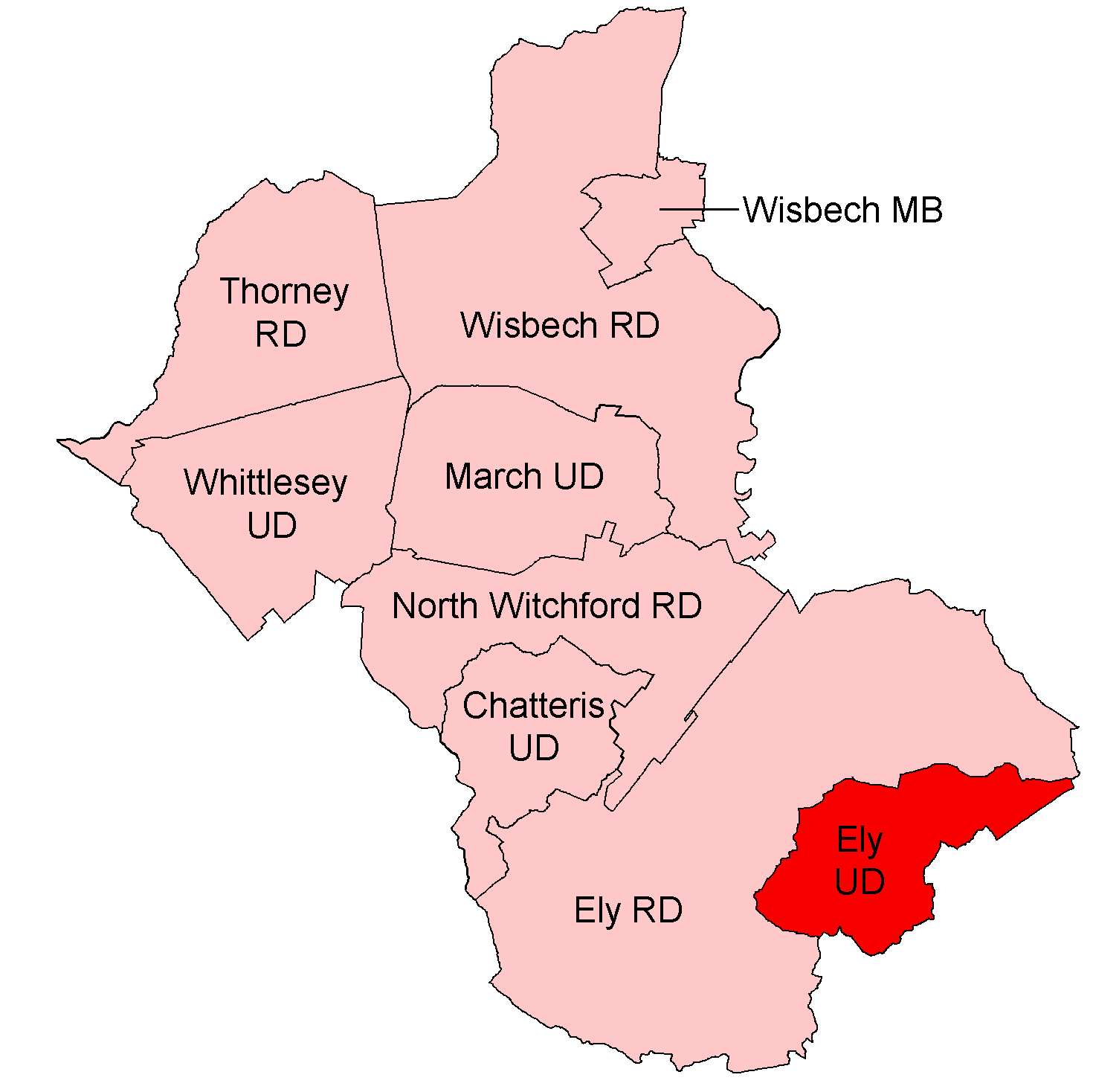
Position within Isle of Ely

During the Second World War, the responsibility for running fire brigades passed from district councils to the National Fire Service, and a new fire station for the city was built on Egremont Street. After the war, the council converted the old fire station at 6 Lynn Road to become its offices and meeting place.

In 1965 the two administrative counties of Isle of Ely and Cambridgeshire merged to form a single county called Cambridgeshire and Isle of Ely, which therefore became the county-level authority covering Ely Urban District.

== Abolition ==
Ely Urban District was abolished under the Local Government Act 1972. On 1 April 1974 the area became part of the new district of East Cambridgeshire. A successor parish was created covering the former Ely Urban District, with city status being granted to the new parish on 1 April 1974, the day it came into being, allowing the parish council to call itself City of Ely Council.

The new East Cambridgeshire District Council initially used the old urban district council's offices at 6 Lynn Road for some of its departments, but the building has since been demolished, with the district council having consolidated its offices at The Grange on Nutholt Lane. The City of Ely Council was based at the Old Gaol at 4 Lynn Road until the mid 1990s, then at 72 Market Street. In 2013 it acquired the Sessions House (formerly known as Shire Hall), which had ceased to operate as a magistrates court in 2011. The city council is therefore now based in the building where its predecessors, the local board and the urban district council, had met from 1850 until the 1940s.
