= Chettisham =

Hamlet in Cambridgeshire, England

Coordinates: 52.42°N 0.27°E

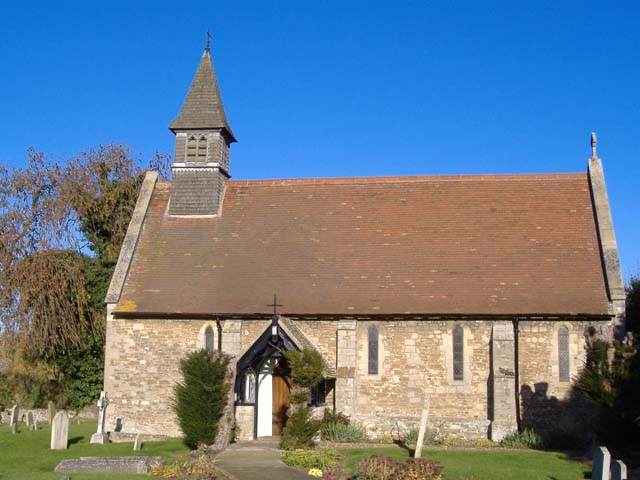
- St. Michael and All Angels, Chettisham

- Location within Cambridgeshire
- OS grid reference: TL541823
- District: East Cambridgeshire
- Shire county: Cambridgeshire
- Region: East
- Country: England
- Sovereign state: United Kingdom
- Post town: Ely
- Postcode district: CB6

Chettisham is a hamlet in East Cambridgeshire between Ely and Littleport. The main claim to fame is St. Michael church.

There are some pictures and a description of the church at the Cambridgeshire Churches website.

== Etymology ==
The name Chettisham is first attested around 1170, as Chetesham. The first element is thought to derive from the Common Brittonic word that survives in modern Welsh as coed ("wood"). This became a place-name in its own right. Adopted into Old English, that place-name (itself now lost) was then included (in the genitive case) in the name of a neighbouring settlement though the addition of the Old English word hām ("home, estate, farm"). Thus the name once meant "farm at the place called Chet".
