= Kate Ellis (author) =

British author of crime fiction

Kate Ellis is a British author of crime fiction, best known for a series of detective novels, which blends history with mystery, featuring policeman Wesley Peterson.

Ellis' first novel, Merchant's House, published in 1998, received positive reviews and was chosen as one of the ten best summer reads by Woman's Weekly. She has since written 25 more novels in this series, many to critical acclaim.

Ellis has also the written five novels set in Yorkshire as part of the Joe Plantagenet series and an historical crime novel, The Devil's Priest, which is set in 16th century Liverpool. More recently, A High Mortality of Doves, The Boy Who Lived With The Dead and The House of the Hanged Woman comprised a trilogy set in the aftermath of the First World War, featuring DI Albert Lincoln.

She was elected a member of The Detection Club in 2014 and is a member of the Crime Writers Association.

Ellis was the winner of the CWA Dagger in the Library Award 2019

== Novels ==
Featuring Wesley Peterson

- The Merchant's House, 1998
- The Armada Boy, 1999
- An Unhallowed Grave, 1999
- The Funeral Boat, 2000
- The Bone Garden, 2001
- A Painted Doom, 2002
- The Skeleton Room, 2003
- The Plague Maiden, 2004
- A Cursed Inheritance, 2005
- The Marriage Hearse, 2006
- The Shining Skull, 2007
- The Blood Pit, 2008
- A Perfect Death, 2009
- The Flesh Tailor, 2010
- The Jackal Man, 2011
- The Cadaver Game, 2012
- The Shadow Collector, 2013
- The Shroud Maker, 2014
- The Death Season, 2015
- The House of Eyes, 2016
- The Mermaid's Scream, 2017
- The Mechanical Devil, 2018
- Dead Man's Lane, 2019
- The Burial Circle, 2020
- The Stone Chamber, 2021
- Serpent’s Point, 2022
- The Killing Place, 2023
- Coffin Island, 2024
- Deadly Remains, 2025

Featuring Joe Plantagenet

- Seeking the Dead, 2008
- Playing with Bones, 2009
- Kissing the Demons, 2011
- Watching the Ghosts, 2012
- Walking by Night, 2015
- Killing in the Shadows, 2026

Others

- The Devil's Priest, 2006 (historical novel)
- A High Mortality of Doves (the first of the Albert Lincoln trilogy), 2016
- The Boy Who Lived With The Dead (the second of the Albert Lincoln trilogy), 2018
- The House of the Hanged Woman (the third of the Albert Lincoln trilogy), 2020
