= Jim Kelly (author) =

British author (born 1957)

- Born: 1 April 1957 (age 69); Barnet, Hertfordshire, England
- Spouse: Midge Gillies
- Writing career
- Genre: Crime
- Notable awards: Crime Writers' Association Dagger in the Library (2006)
- Website: www.jim-kelly.co.uk

Jim Kelly is a British author and journalist. He won the Crime Writers' Association Dagger in the Library award in 2006 writing as JG Kelly.

As of 2026, Kelly has written nineteen crime novels. His first series began with The Water Clock, featuring fictional journalist Philip Dryden, based in the Cambridgeshire area of Great Britain. Kelly won the CWA Dagger in the Library Award in 2006 for the Dryden books. His new series, based on Detective Inspector Peter Shaw, is based on the North Norfolk coast and in the port of Lynn. In 2010 Kelly won the New Angle prize for literature for Death Watch, the second in the Shaw and Valentine series.

He is married to the biographer Midge Gillies and they have a daughter together.

== Bibliography ==
=== Philip Dryden Series ===
- The Water Clock 2003
- The Fire Baby 2005
- The Moon Tunnel 2005
- The Coldest Blood 2006
- The Skeleton Man 2007
- Nightrise 2012
- The Funeral Owl 2013

=== DI Peter Shaw ===
- Death Wore White 2008
- Death Watch 2010
- Death Toll 2011
- Death's Door 2012
- At Death's Window 2014
- Death on Demand 2015
- Death Ship 2016

=== Nighthawk ===
- The Great Darkness 2018
- The Mathematical Bridge 2019
- The Night Raids 2020
- The Cambridge Siren 2025
- The American Suspect 2026
