= City of Ely Council =

UK local authority for the city of Ely, Cambridgeshire, England

Type
- Type: Parish council of Ely, Cambridgeshire
- Houses: Unicameral

History
- Founded: 1 April 1974
- Preceded by: City of Ely Urban District Council

Meeting place
- Sessions House, Lynn Road, Ely

Website
- www.cityofelycouncil.org.uk

The City of Ely Council is the parish council responsible for local government within the civil parish of the city of Ely, Cambridgeshire, England.

The parish council was formed on 1 April 1974 as a successor authority of the City of Ely Urban District Council. The parish council derives its powers and functions from the Local Government Act 1972 and subsequent legislation.

The civil parish of Ely is divided into four wards called Ely North, Ely South, Ely East and Ely West for the purpose of electing the fourteen councillors to the parish council.

It is a precepting authority, with tax collected on its behalf by East Cambridgeshire District Council.
