= Kingaby =

Kingaby is a surname. Notable people with the surname include:

- Donald Kingaby (1920–1990), Royal Air Force officer
- Herbert Kingaby (1880–1934), British footballer
