= Listed buildings in Ely, Cambridgeshire =

Ely is a city and civil parish in the county of Cambridgeshire, England It contains 196 listed buildings that are recorded in the National Heritage List for England. Of these 25 are grade I, eight are grade II* and 163 are grade II.

This list is based on the information retrieved online from Historic England.

== Key ==
Grade	Criteria
I	Buildings that are of exceptional interest
II*	Particularly important buildings of more than special interest
II	Buildings that are of special interest

== Listing ==
Name	Grade	Location	Type	Completed (Note: The date given is the date used by Historic England as significant for the initial building or that of an important part in the structure's description.)	Date designated	Grid ref. (Note: The grid reference is based on the British national grid reference system, sometimes known as OSGB36, used by the Ordnance Survey.) Geo-coordinates	Notes	Entry number (Note: The "List Entry Number" is a unique number assigned to each listed building and scheduled monument by Historic England.)	Image	Wikidata
A Medieval Wall on the South Side of Chapel Street	II				19 June 1972	TL5384880462; 52°24′02″N 0°15′36″E		1167978	Upload Photo	Q26461394
Cathedral of the Holy Trinity	I		Anglican cathedral		23 September 1950	TL5404680281; 52°23′56″N 0°15′46″E		1331690	Cathedral of the Holy Trinity More images	Q579004
Parish Church of St Mary	I		church building		23 September 1950	TL5384980241; 52°23′55″N 0°15′35″E		1126519	Parish Church of St Mary More images	Q17527581
Parsons' Almshouses	II	CB7 4HD	almshouse		19 June 1972	TL5379780237; 52°23′55″N 0°15′33″E		1252295	Parsons' Almshouses More images	Q26544178
Cutter Public House	II	Annesdale	pub		19 June 1972	TL5441479777; 52°23′39″N 0°16′05″E		1126520	Cutter Public House More images	Q26419465
Wall to Passageway at Rear of the Gardens to Castelhythe (station Road)	II	Annesdale			19 June 1972	TL5429279752; 52°23′39″N 0°15′58″E		1331691	Upload Photo	Q26616570
Hill House	II*	Back Hill	house		23 September 1950	TL5402779931; 52°23′45″N 0°15′44″E		1126521	Hill House More images	Q17543493
Old Needhams School (cambridgeshire and Isle of Ely County Council Teacher's Centre)	II	Back Hill			23 September 1950	TL5406679872; 52°23′43″N 0°15′46″E		1331692	Upload Photo	Q26616571
Telephone Kiosk	II	Barton Square			31 December 1987	TL5398779990; 52°23′47″N 0°15′42″E		1262253	Upload Photo	Q26553141
Gazebo and Walls at Malabars	II	Brays Lane			5 January 1998	TL5439180384; 52°23′59″N 0°16′04″E		1376792	Upload Photo	Q26657311
6 and 8, Broad Street	II	6 and 8, Broad Street			19 June 1972	TL5441480153; 52°23′51″N 0°16′05″E		1126524	Upload Photo	Q26419467
23 Broad Street	II	23 Broad Street			23 September 1950	TL5434979958; 52°23′45″N 0°16′01″E		1126522	Upload Photo	Q26419466
25 Broad Street	II	25, Broad Street			19 June 1972	TL5433879941; 52°23′45″N 0°16′01″E		1331693	Upload Photo	Q26616572
41 and 41a, Broad Street	II*	41 and 41a, Broad Street			23 September 1950	TL5431279884; 52°23′43″N 0°15′59″E		1126523	Upload Photo	Q17543503
54, Broad Street	II	54, Broad Street			19 June 1972	TL5434880012; 52°23′47″N 0°16′01″E		1331694	Upload Photo	Q26616573
90-94 Broad Street	II	90-94, Broad Street			19 June 1972	TL5429079896; 52°23′43″N 0°15′58″E		1126525	Upload Photo	Q26419468
96, Broad Street	II	96, Broad Street			19 June 1972	TL5428479887; 52°23′43″N 0°15′58″E		1167137	Upload Photo	Q26460593
74a, Broad Street	II	74a, Broad Street			15 April 1991	TL5430879968; 52°23′46″N 0°15′59″E		1252455	Upload Photo	Q26544320
Church of St Peter in Ely	II	Broad Street	church building		22 April 1999	TL5424379782; 52°23′40″N 0°15′55″E	contains a fine Ninian Comper rood screen	1386585	Church of St Peter in Ely More images	Q26666277
Old Brewery Barrel House	II	Broad Street			14 March 1995	TL5447580014; 52°23′47″N 0°16′08″E		1252460	Upload Photo	Q26544325
11, Cambridge Road	II	11, Cambridge Road			19 June 1972	TL5358580086; 52°23′50″N 0°15′21″E		1331695	Upload Photo	Q26616574
Tower Hospital	II	Cambridge Road			3 August 1993	TL5330979914; 52°23′45″N 0°15′06″E		1252456	Upload Photo	Q26544321
4, Chapel Street	II	4, Chapel Street			19 June 1972	TL5403180507; 52°24′03″N 0°15′45″E		1167148	Upload Photo	Q26460606
9 and 11, Chapel Street	II	9 and 11, Chapel Street			19 June 1972	TL5394980486; 52°24′03″N 0°15′41″E		1331721	Upload Photo	Q26616598
Huntingdon Manse	II	10, Chapel Street			19 June 1972	TL5398880508; 52°24′03″N 0°15′43″E		1331696	Upload Photo	Q26616575
12, Chapel Street	II	12, Chapel Street			19 June 1972	TL5397180504; 52°24′03″N 0°15′42″E		1331720	Upload Photo	Q26616597
18, Chapel Street	II	18, Chapel Street			19 June 1972	TL5395380503; 52°24′03″N 0°15′41″E		1126499	Upload Photo	Q26419452
Congregational Chapel	II	Chapel Street			23 September 1950	TL5400780522; 52°24′04″N 0°15′44″E		1167158	Upload Photo	Q5177060
3, Chequers Lane	II	3, Chequers Lane			19 June 1972	TL5411380376; 52°23′59″N 0°15′50″E		1126500	Upload Photo	Q26419453
Premises Occupied by H J Cutlack	II	Chequers Lane			23 September 1950	TL5409980376; 52°23′59″N 0°15′49″E		1126501	Upload Photo	Q26419454
Church of St Michael	II	Chettisham	church building		23 September 1950	TL5468283346; 52°25′34″N 0°16′25″E		1331722	Church of St Michael More images	Q26616599
4, Church Lane	II	4, Church Lane			19 June 1972	TL5387480177; 52°23′53″N 0°15′37″E		1126502	Upload Photo	Q26419455
St Mary's Cottage	II	20, Church Lane	cottage		23 September 1950	TL5389380279; 52°23′56″N 0°15′38″E		1331683	St Mary's Cottage More images	Q26616567
Wall to Bishop's Palace Walls to Bishop's Palace	II	Church Lane			19 June 1972	TL5391480279; 52°23′56″N 0°15′39″E		1331689	Upload Photo	Q26616569
The Barn	II	Cromwell Road			19 June 1972	TL5368280301; 52°23′57″N 0°15′27″E		1167539	Upload Photo	Q26460991
2, Downham Road (see Details for Further Address Information)	II	2, Downham Road			19 June 1972	TL5383880353; 52°23′58″N 0°15′35″E		1331742	Upload Photo	Q26616618
3 and 5, Downham Road	II	3 and 5, Downham Road			23 September 1960	TL5380180357; 52°23′59″N 0°15′33″E		1126512	Upload Photo	Q26419458
30, Egremont Street	II	30, Egremont Street			19 June 1972	TL5387580624; 52°24′07″N 0°15′37″E		1167563	Upload Photo	Q26461014
31, Egremont Street	II	31, Egremont Street			19 June 1972	TL5384880612; 52°24′07″N 0°15′36″E		1126514	Upload Photo	Q26419460
Egremont House	II	Egremont Street			19 June 1972	TL5390980659; 52°24′08″N 0°15′39″E		1126513	Upload Photo	Q26419459
Old King William Iv House	II	Egremont Street, CB6 1AE			19 June 1972	TL5405580550; 52°24′05″N 0°15′47″E		1126488	Upload Photo	Q26419442
2, Fore Hill	II	2, Fore Hill			12 December 1968	TL5429280273; 52°23′55″N 0°15′59″E		1296818	Upload Photo	Q26584447
22, Fore Hill	II	22, Fore Hill			23 September 1950	TL5436780223; 52°23′54″N 0°16′03″E		1126515	Upload Photo	Q26419461
35, Fore Hill	II	35, Fore Hill			19 June 1972	TL5442380229; 52°23′54″N 0°16′06″E		1126517	Upload Photo	Q26419463
39, Fore Hill	II	39, Fore Hill			19 June 1972	TL5442480212; 52°23′53″N 0°16′06″E		1126518	Upload Photo	Q26419464
41, Fore Hill	II	41, Fore Hill			19 June 1972	TL5443280208; 52°23′53″N 0°16′06″E		1167619	Upload Photo	Q26461059
No. 47, Fore Hill	II	47, Fore Hill			10 June 1991	TL5446080183; 52°23′52″N 0°16′08″E		1262254	Upload Photo	Q26553142
Royal Standard Public House	II	Fore Hill			19 June 1972	TL5435880210; 52°23′53″N 0°16′02″E		1126516	Upload Photo	Q26419462
2, High Street	II	2, High Street			19 June 1972	TL5403280349; 52°23′58″N 0°15′45″E		1126483	Upload Photo	Q26419436
5, High Street	II	5, High Street			19 June 1972	TL5406580369; 52°23′59″N 0°15′47″E		1331712	Upload Photo	Q26616590
12-14, High Street	II	12-14, High Street, CB7 4JZ			23 September 1950	TL5408680339; 52°23′58″N 0°15′48″E		1126484	Upload Photo	Q26419437
Nos. 16 and 18 High Street (including Steeple Gate)	II*	16-18 High Street, CB7 4JU			23 September 1950	TL5409780339; 52°23′58″N 0°15′49″E		1331714	Upload Photo	Q17543634
Nos. 20, 22, 24 and 24a High Street	II	20-24a High Street, CB7 4JU			23 September 1950	TL5411880331; 52°23′57″N 0°15′50″E		1126485	Upload Photo	Q26419439
21a and 23, High Street	II	21a and 23, High Street			17 November 2008	TL5416080351; 52°23′58″N 0°15′52″E		1392622	Upload Photo	Q26671834
33 High Street	II	Cambs, CB7 4LF			8 November 1993	TL5418480340; 52°23′58″N 0°15′53″E		1252458	Upload Photo	Q26544323
41, High Street	II	41, High Street			19 June 1972	TL5421080338; 52°23′58″N 0°15′55″E		1126482	Upload Photo	Q26419435
49a, High Street	II	49a, High Street			19 June 1972	TL5423080332; 52°23′57″N 0°15′56″E		1331713	Upload Photo	Q26616591
3 High Street Passage	II	3 High Street Passage, CB7 4NB			18 May 1998	TL5418980379; 52°23′59″N 0°15′54″E		1271807	Upload Photo	Q26561715
16, Hills Lane	II	16, Hills Lane			19 June 1972	TL5338880394; 52°24′00″N 0°15′11″E		1167712	Upload Photo	Q26461148
45, Hills Lane	II	45, Hills Lane			19 June 1972	TL5338180347; 52°23′59″N 0°15′11″E		1331715	Upload Photo	Q26616592
Nos. 1, 2 and 3 John Beckett Court	II	1, 2 and 3, John Beckett Court, Chapel Street			19 June 1972	TL5387280442; 52°24′01″N 0°15′37″E		1331741	Upload Photo	Q26616617
Quayside House	II	3, Little Lane			19 June 1972	TL5453279980; 52°23′46″N 0°16′11″E		1252436	Upload Photo	Q26544303
Forge Cottage	II	Lower Road, Stuntney, CB7 5TN			19 June 1972	TL5547078214; 52°22′48″N 0°16′58″E		1296756	Upload Photo	Q26584391
Manor House	II	11, Lower Street, Stuntney, CB7 5TN			19 June 1972	TL5544778159; 52°22′46″N 0°16′56″E		1126486	Upload Photo	Q26419440
Lamb Hotel	II	2, Lynn Road	hotel		12 December 1968	TL5404280379; 52°23′59″N 0°15′46″E		1331716	Lamb Hotel More images	Q26616593
No 4 Lynn Road	II	4 Lynn Road			12 December 1968	TL5405980465; 52°24′02″N 0°15′47″E		1126487	Upload Photo	Q26419441
2 and 2a Chapel Street and 15 Lynn Road, Formerly 2 Chapel Street	II	15, Lynn Road, CB6 1AD			19 June 1972	TL5404080506; 52°24′03″N 0°15′46″E		1126526	Upload Photo	Q26419469
21 and 23, Lynn Road	II	21 and 23, Lynn Road			15 January 1996	TL5405180528; 52°24′04″N 0°15′47″E		1245377	Upload Photo	Q26537923
27, Lynn Road	II	27, Lynn Road			15 January 1996	TL5405380540; 52°24′04″N 0°15′47″E		1245378	Upload Photo	Q26537924
Prickwillow Engine House	II	Main Street, Prickwillow, CB7 4UN			23 September 1993	TL5977282424; 52°24′59″N 0°20′52″E		1262255	Upload Photo	Q26553143
1, Market Place	II	1, Market Place			28 January 1991	TL5426380392; 52°23′59″N 0°15′58″E		1252454	Upload Photo	Q26544319
White Hart Hotel	II	3, Market Place			23 September 1950	TL5427480376; 52°23′59″N 0°15′58″E		1167759	Upload Photo	Q26461188
5 Market Place	II	5 Market Place, CB7 4NU			19 June 1972	TL5428380368; 52°23′58″N 0°15′59″E		1331717	Upload Photo	Q26616594
7 and 9 Market Place	II	7 and 9, Market Place, CB7 4NP			19 June 1972	TL5430580347; 52°23′58″N 0°16′00″E		1126489	Upload Photo	Q26419443
Archer House	II	15, Market Place			23 September 1950	TL5433280330; 52°23′57″N 0°16′01″E		1296691	Upload Photo	Q26584327
Vineyard Lodge	II	21, Market Place			19 June 1972	TL5436080331; 52°23′57″N 0°16′03″E		1331718	Upload Photo	Q26616595
18, 20 and 22, Market Street	II	18, 20 and 22, Market Street			9 June 1994	TL5419180420; 52°24′00″N 0°15′54″E		1252459	Upload Photo	Q26544324
35-41, Market Street	II	35-41, Market Street			12 December 1968	TL5411980418; 52°24′00″N 0°15′50″E		1296695	Upload Photo	Q26584331
60-68, Market Street	II	60-68, Market Street			23 September 1950	TL5410080456; 52°24′02″N 0°15′49″E		1126490	Upload Photo	Q26419444
7-11, Newnham Street	II	7-11, Newnham Street			29 November 1971	TL5421780440; 52°24′01″N 0°15′55″E		1126491	Upload Photo	Q26419445
13 and 15, Newnham Street	II	13 and 15, Newnham Street			29 November 1971	TL5422580458; 52°24′01″N 0°15′56″E		1167852	Upload Photo	Q26461279
27 and 29, Newnham Street	II	27 and 29, Newnham Street			19 June 1972	TL5424580498; 52°24′03″N 0°15′57″E		1126492	Upload Photo	Q26419446
3 Palace Green	II*	3, Palace Green, Cambs, CB7 4EW	building		23 September 1950	TL5398980327; 52°23′57″N 0°15′43″E		1126494	3 Palace Green More images	Q17543489
The Chantry	II*	Palace Green	architectural structure		23 September 1950	TL5393780333; 52°23′58″N 0°15′40″E		1126493	The Chantry More images	Q17543479
Wall and Gates to the Chantry	II	Palace Green			19 June 1972	TL5397380320; 52°23′57″N 0°15′42″E		1296670	Upload Photo	Q26584307
Walls and Railings to Number 3	II	Palace Green			19 June 1972	TL5397680329; 52°23′58″N 0°15′42″E		1126495	Upload Photo	Q26419447
54, Quayside	II	54, Quayside			19 June 1972	TL5453279954; 52°23′45″N 0°16′11″E		1126496	Upload Photo	Q26419448
56 and 58, Quayside	II	56 and 58, Quayside			19 June 1972	TL5453079945; 52°23′45″N 0°16′11″E		1167873	Upload Photo	Q26461296
60, Quayside	II	60, Quayside			12 December 1968	TL5452879939; 52°23′44″N 0°16′11″E		1331719	Upload Photo	Q26616596
62 and 64, Quayside	II	62 and 64, Quayside			12 December 1968	TL5452879934; 52°23′44″N 0°16′11″E		1126497	Upload Photo	Q26419449
Malting Cottage	II	68, Quayside			19 June 1972	TL5448779860; 52°23′42″N 0°16′09″E		1126498	Upload Photo	Q26419450
Ely Maltings	II	Quayside			12 December 1968	TL5447379893; 52°23′43″N 0°16′08″E		1296673	Upload Photo	Q26584310
Almonry, Sacrists Hall, Gate and Goldsmiths Tower the Almonry	I	Sacrists Hall, Gate And Goldsmiths Tower, High Street	building		23 September 1950	TL5424680291; 52°23′56″N 0°15′56″E		1126503	Almonry, Sacrists Hall, Gate and Goldsmiths Tower the Almonry More images	Q17527547
Almonry, Sacrists Hall, Gate and Goldsmiths Tower the Sacristy Gate and Goldsmith's Tower	I	Sacrists Hall, Gate And Goldsmiths Tower, High Street	architectural structure		23 September 1950	TL5419780313; 52°23′57″N 0°15′54″E		1126504	Almonry, Sacrists Hall, Gate and Goldsmiths Tower the Sacristy Gate and Goldsmith's Tower More images	Q17527550
Sessions House	II*	Shire Hall, Lynn Road, CB7 4EG	sessions house		23 September 1950	TL5406980515; 52°24′03″N 0°15′48″E	Features a fine tetrastyle portico	1296765	Sessions House More images	Q17543594
Fountain Public House	II	1, Silver Street	pub		19 June 1972	TL5396280018; 52°23′48″N 0°15′41″E		1252297	Fountain Public House More images	Q26544180
5, Silver Street	II	5, Silver Street			23 September 1950	TL5394280032; 52°23′48″N 0°15′40″E		1262365	Upload Photo	Q26553244
7-13, Silver Street	II	7-13, Silver Street	building		23 September 1950	TL5393680036; 52°23′48″N 0°15′40″E		1252321	7-13, Silver Street More images	Q26544199
Church of the Holy Cross	II*	Soham Road, Stuntney	church building		23 September 1950	TL5558678335; 52°22′51″N 0°17′04″E		1252346	Church of the Holy Cross More images	Q17543592
St John's Farmhouse	I	1, St John's Road	farmhouse		23 September 1950	TL5350680210; 52°23′54″N 0°15′17″E	Former 11th-century infirmary, now four private dwellings	1167882	St John's Farmhouse More images	Q17527664
Barn to South-west of St John's Farmhouse	I	St John's Road, CB6 3BG			23 September 1950	TL5338880176; 52°23′53″N 0°15′11″E		1126456	Upload Photo	Q17527535
Dove House to St John's Farm	I	St John's Road, CB6 3BY			23 September 1950	TL5352480196; 52°23′54″N 0°15′18″E		1331739	Upload Photo	Q17527727
Infirmary Hall to the North of St John's Farmhouse (formerly Barn to the North of St John's Farmhouse)	I	St John's Road, CB6 3BQ			23 September 1950	TL5350580231; 52°23′55″N 0°15′17″E		1126455	Upload Photo	Q17527531
Wall to St John's Farm	II	St John's Road			19 June 1972	TL5351680246; 52°23′55″N 0°15′18″E		1167908	Upload Photo	Q26461329
2-4, St Mary's Street	II	2-4, St Mary's Street			7 October 2010	TL5401680389; 52°23′59″N 0°15′44″E		1394128	2-4, St Mary's Street More images	Q26673244
6, St Marys Street	II	6, St Marys Street			22 May 2007	TL5400580394; 52°24′00″N 0°15′44″E		1391975	6, St Marys Street More images	Q26671303
13, St Mary's Street	II	13, St Mary's Street			19 June 1972	TL5394980361; 52°23′59″N 0°15′41″E		1126465	Upload Photo	Q26419422
15, St Mary's Street	II	15, St Mary's Street			19 June 1972	TL5394180371; 52°23′59″N 0°15′40″E		1168065	15, St Mary's Street More images	Q26461477
17, St Mary's Street	II	17, St Mary's Street			19 June 1972	TL5393380357; 52°23′58″N 0°15′40″E		1331706	Upload Photo	Q26616584
19-23, St Marys Street	II	19-23, St Marys Street			19 June 1972	TL5389780364; 52°23′59″N 0°15′38″E		1126466	19-23, St Marys Street More images	Q26419423
20, St Mary's Street	II	20, St Mary's Street			19 June 1972	TL5393680408; 52°24′00″N 0°15′40″E		1331740	20, St Mary's Street More images	Q26616616
22 and 22a, St Marys Street	II	22 and 22a, St Marys Street			19 June 1972	TL5392780407; 52°24′00″N 0°15′40″E		1126457	22 and 22a, St Marys Street More images	Q26419414
24, St Marys Street	II	24, St Marys Street, CB7 4ES			12 December 1968	TL5391080408; 52°24′00″N 0°15′39″E		1296637	24, St Marys Street More images	Q26584276
Old Fire Engine House	II	25, St Mary's Street			12 December 1968	TL5386380315; 52°23′57″N 0°15′36″E		1168070	Upload Photo	Q26461482
Palace Green Cottage	II	27, St Mary's Street			12 December 1968	TL5389280303; 52°23′57″N 0°15′38″E		1331707	Upload Photo	Q26616585
28, St Mary's Street	II	28, St Mary's Street	building		23 September 1950	TL5387880396; 52°24′00″N 0°15′37″E		1126458	28, St Mary's Street More images	Q26419415
Oliver Cromwell's House	II*	29, St Mary's Street, CB7 4HF	clergy house		23 September 1950	TL5380980260; 52°23′55″N 0°15′33″E	St Mary's Vicarage is also known as Cromwell House is a c. 14th-century timber-frame building. In 1638, Oliver Cromwell moved into this house which formerly belonged to his uncle, Sir Thomas Steward. Cromwell moved to London in 1646. Between 1843 and 1847 it was a public house. Today it functions as a museum and tourist information centre.	1126467	Oliver Cromwell's House More images	Q7087467
29a, St Mary's Street	II	29a, St Mary's Street			19 June 1972	TL5374980230; 52°23′55″N 0°15′30″E		1252296	Upload Photo	Q26544179
30, St Mary's Street	II	30, St Mary's Street			19 June 1972	TL5386080380; 52°23′59″N 0°15′36″E		1126459	Upload Photo	Q26419416
34, St Mary's Street	II	34, St Mary's Street			19 June 1972	TL5384880366; 52°23′59″N 0°15′36″E		1296644	Upload Photo	Q26584282
38a St Mary's Street	II	38a St. Marys Street, CB7 4ES			12 December 1968	TL5382380339; 52°23′58″N 0°15′34″E		1126511	Upload Photo	Q26419457
40 and 42, St Mary's Street	II	40 and 42, St Mary's Street			19 June 1972	TL5381580326; 52°23′58″N 0°15′34″E		1126460	Upload Photo	Q26419417
St Mary's Lodge	II	44, St Mary's Street			23 September 1950	TL5379880306; 52°23′57″N 0°15′33″E		1168010	Upload Photo	Q26461425
46, St Mary's Street	II	46, St Mary's Street			19 June 1972	TL5379080304; 52°23′57″N 0°15′32″E		1126461	Upload Photo	Q26419418
48 St Mary's Street	II	48 St. Marys Street, CB7 4EY			12 December 1968	TL5378880296; 52°23′57″N 0°15′32″E		1331703	Upload Photo	Q26616581
50, St Mary's Street	II	50, St Mary's Street			12 December 1968	TL5377780289; 52°23′56″N 0°15′32″E		1168020	Upload Photo	Q26461434
52 and 54, St Mary's Street	II	52 and 54, St Mary's Street			12 December 1968	TL5377480285; 52°23′56″N 0°15′32″E		1126462	Upload Photo	Q26419419
56-60, St Mary's Street	II	56-60, St Mary's Street			12 December 1968	TL5377080277; 52°23′56″N 0°15′31″E		1168039	Upload Photo	Q26461450
70, St Mary's Street	II	70, St Mary's Street			19 June 1972	TL5369080233; 52°23′55″N 0°15′27″E		1331704	Upload Photo	Q26616582
72, St Marys Street	II	72, St Marys Street			19 June 1972	TL5368580225; 52°23′54″N 0°15′27″E		1126463	Upload Photo	Q26419420
74, St Mary's Street	II	74, St Mary's Street			19 June 1972	TL5367580230; 52°23′55″N 0°15′26″E		1296629	Upload Photo	Q26584269
76-80, St Mary's Street	II	76-80, St Mary's Street			19 June 1972	TL5367280219; 52°23′54″N 0°15′26″E		1126464	Upload Photo	Q26419421
82 and 84 St Mary's Street	II	CB7 4HH			12 December 1968	TL5364880214; 52°23′54″N 0°15′25″E		1331705	Upload Photo	Q26616583
86, St Mary's Street	II	86, St Mary's Street			19 June 1972	TL5364380220; 52°23′54″N 0°15′24″E		1296594	Upload Photo	Q26584232
Castlehythe	II	3, Station Road			19 June 1972	TL5423579742; 52°23′38″N 0°15′55″E		1262326	Upload Photo	Q26891916
Castlehythe	II	5, Station Road			19 June 1972	TL5424479737; 52°23′38″N 0°15′55″E		1252301	Upload Photo	Q26544184
Castlehythe	II	7, Station Road			19 June 1972	TL5425279730; 52°23′38″N 0°15′56″E		1252302	Upload Photo	Q26681575
Castlehythe	II	9-13, Station Road			19 June 1972	TL5426479722; 52°23′38″N 0°15′57″E		1262337	Upload Photo	Q66480454
Castlehythe	II	15 and 17, Station Road			19 June 1972	TL5427679716; 52°23′37″N 0°15′57″E		1262327	Upload Photo	Q66477489
Castlehythe	II	21, Station Road			19 June 1972	TL5429579708; 52°23′37″N 0°15′58″E		1252324	Upload Photo	Q26891455
Finches	II	16 Lower Road, Stuntney, CB7 5TN			19 June 1972	TL5545078108; 52°22′44″N 0°16′57″E		1296759	Upload Photo	Q26584394
Barn and Storehouse of the Monastery	I	The College	barn		23 September 1950	TL5400980000; 52°23′47″N 0°15′43″E	Built c. 1575, the barn and storehouse of the monastery is located to the south of Ely Porta	1126508	Barn and Storehouse of the Monastery More images	Q17527566
Bishop's Palace (the Palace School)	I	The College	architectural structure		23 September 1950	TL5395580248; 52°23′55″N 0°15′41″E	The Bishop's palace is a 15th-century structure built during John Alcock's (1486–1501) bishopric	1296856	Bishop's Palace (the Palace School) More images	Q17527668
Cellarers House (boarding House of King's School)	I	The College	house		23 September 1950	TL5413680178; 52°23′53″N 0°15′50″E	Cellarers	1126510	Cellarers House (boarding House of King's School) More images	Q17527576
Ely Porta	I	The College	gatehouse		23 September 1950	TL5400880029; 52°23′48″N 0°15′43″E		1167340	Ely Porta More images	Q17527647
Guest Quarters of the Monastery	I	The College	architectural structure		23 June 1950	TL5401880128; 52°23′51″N 0°15′44″E		1167322	Guest Quarters of the Monastery More images	Q17527638
Powcher's Hall	I	The College	architectural structure		23 September 1950	TL5415680201; 52°23′53″N 0°15′52″E		1167407	Powcher's Hall More images	Q17527654
Prior Craudens Chapel	I	The College	chapel		23 September 1950	TL5404680141; 52°23′51″N 0°15′46″E		1331686	Prior Craudens Chapel More images	Q17527713
Prior's House (boarding House of the Kings School)	I	The College	architectural structure		23 September 1950	TL5405580149; 52°23′52″N 0°15′46″E		1167326	Prior's House (boarding House of the Kings School) More images	Q17527641
The Black Hostelry and Cellarers Chamber	I	The College	house		23 September 1950	TL5415680181; 52°23′53″N 0°15′52″E		1167456	The Black Hostelry and Cellarers Chamber More images	Q17527659
The Chapel of the Infirmary (deanery)	I	The College			23 September 1950	TL5419880185; 52°23′53″N 0°15′54″E		1331688	Upload Photo	Q17527721
The Dark Cloister	I	The College	architectural structure		23 September 1950	TL5412980195; 52°23′53″N 0°15′50″E		1331687	The Dark Cloister More images	Q17527717
The Great Hall (bishop's Residence)	I	The College	episcopal palace		23 September 1950	TL5405480174; 52°23′52″N 0°15′46″E		1167260	The Great Hall (bishop's Residence) More images	Q17527633
The Painted Chamber (walsingham House)	I	The College	school building		23 September 1950	TL5417280194; 52°23′53″N 0°15′52″E		1126509	The Painted Chamber (walsingham House) More images	Q17527570
The Queen's Hall (headmaster's House)	I	The College	architectural structure		23 September 1950	TL5402880172; 52°23′52″N 0°15′45″E		1126505	The Queen's Hall (headmaster's House) More images	Q17527556
Wall to the Barn and Storehouse of the Monastery	II	The College			19 June 1972	TL5400979967; 52°23′46″N 0°15′43″E		1167375	Upload Photo	Q26460824
Wall to the Garden of the Bishop's Residence	II	The College			19 June 1972	TL5402880224; 52°23′54″N 0°15′45″E		1331685	Upload Photo	Q26616568
Wall to the Garden of the Almonry and Painted Chamber	I	The College	wall		19 June 1972	TL5426880290; 52°23′56″N 0°15′58″E		1331684	Wall to the Garden of the Almonry and Painted Chamber More images	Q17527709
Walls to the Gardens of the Prior's House and Guest Hall	II	The College			19 June 1972	TL5403380111; 52°23′50″N 0°15′45″E		1126507	Upload Photo	Q26419456
Walls to the Guest Quarters of the Monastery and Ely Porta	I	The College			19 June 1972	TL5402280094; 52°23′50″N 0°15′44″E		1126506	Upload Photo	Q17527562
2, the Gallery	II	2, The Gallery			19 June 1972	TL5399480082; 52°23′50″N 0°15′43″E		1126478	Upload Photo	Q26419432
3, the Gallery	II	3, The Gallery			19 June 1972	TL5399680092; 52°23′50″N 0°15′43″E		1331710	Upload Photo	Q26616588
4 and 5, the Gallery	II	4 and 5, The Gallery			19 June 1972	TL5399280100; 52°23′50″N 0°15′43″E		1126479	Upload Photo	Q26419433
6, the Gallery	II	6, The Gallery			19 June 1972	TL5399480109; 52°23′50″N 0°15′43″E		1331711	Upload Photo	Q26616589
7 and 8, the Gallery	II	7 and 8, The Gallery			19 June 1972	TL5400280134; 52°23′51″N 0°15′43″E		1126480	Upload Photo	Q26419434
Stables to Bishop's Palace	I	9, The Gallery			23 September 1950	TL5400380161; 52°23′52″N 0°15′43″E		1126481	Upload Photo	Q17527542
2 Waterside and 58 Fore Hill	II	2, Waterside			19 June 1972	TL5448480148; 52°23′51″N 0°16′09″E		1252356	Upload Photo	Q26544231
4 and 6, Waterside	II	4 and 6, Waterside			19 June 1972	TL5450080138; 52°23′51″N 0°16′10″E		1252357	Upload Photo	Q26544232
8-12, Waterside	II	8-12, Waterside			12 December 1968	TL5451480122; 52°23′50″N 0°16′10″E		1252433	Upload Photo	Q26544300
7-11, Waterside (see Details for Further Address Information)	II	13, Waterside			12 December 1968	TL5451780148; 52°23′51″N 0°16′11″E		1262312	Upload Photo	Q26553196
15 and 17, Waterside	II	15 and 17, Waterside			12 December 1968	TL5452480140; 52°23′51″N 0°16′11″E		1252347	Upload Photo	Q26544222
21 and 23, Waterside	II	21 and 23, Waterside			19 June 1972	TL5454280119; 52°23′50″N 0°16′12″E		1262292	Upload Photo	Q26553178
25, Waterside	II	25, Waterside			19 June 1972	TL5454380109; 52°23′50″N 0°16′12″E		1262315	Upload Photo	Q26553199
31 and 33, Waterside	II	31 and 33, Waterside			12 December 1968	TL5454780096; 52°23′49″N 0°16′12″E		1262316	Upload Photo	Q26553200
35-39, Waterside	II	35-39, Waterside			19 June 1972	TL5457180074; 52°23′49″N 0°16′13″E		1262317	Upload Photo	Q26553201
36 and 38, Waterside	II	36 and 38, Waterside			19 June 1972	TL5453680076; 52°23′49″N 0°16′11″E		1252358	Upload Photo	Q26544233
40, Waterside	II	40, Waterside			19 June 1972	TL5453980066; 52°23′48″N 0°16′12″E		1252359	Upload Photo	Q26544234
41-45, Waterside	II	41-45, Waterside			12 December 1968	TL5456680038; 52°23′48″N 0°16′13″E		1262304	Upload Photo	Q26553188
47, Waterside	II	47, Waterside			19 June 1972	TL5456680032; 52°23′47″N 0°16′13″E		1252354	Upload Photo	Q26544229
51 and 53, Waterside	II	51 and 53, Waterside			19 June 1972	TL5456780021; 52°23′47″N 0°16′13″E		1252408	Upload Photo	Q26544276
52, Waterside	II	52, Waterside			12 December 1968	TL5453979988; 52°23′46″N 0°16′11″E		1252360	Upload Photo	Q26544235
65 and 67 Waterside	II	65 and 67, Waterside, CB7 4AU			19 June 1972	TL5459279972; 52°23′45″N 0°16′14″E		1252410	Upload Photo	Q26544278
52a, Waterside	II	52a, Waterside			19 June 1972	TL5454479998; 52°23′46″N 0°16′12″E		1262280	Upload Photo	Q26553166
Black Bull Public House	II	Waterside			19 June 1972	TL5453680126; 52°23′50″N 0°16′12″E		1262313	Upload Photo	Q26553197
Malthouse Adjoining Number 53	II	Waterside			19 June 1972	TL5457380006; 52°23′47″N 0°16′13″E		1252355	Upload Photo	Q26544230
2, West End	II	2, West End			19 June 1972	TL5359280232; 52°23′55″N 0°15′22″E		1252437	Upload Photo	Q26544304
4, West End	II	4, West End			2 November 1993	TL5358780235; 52°23′55″N 0°15′22″E		1252457	Upload Photo	Q26544322
8-12 West End	II	8-12, West End			19 June 1972	TL5356680249; 52°23′55″N 0°15′20″E		1252361	Upload Photo	Q26544236
64, West End	II	64, West End			25 September 1950	TL5337780337; 52°23′58″N 0°15′11″E		1262284	Upload Photo	Q26553170
Waterloo House	II	3 West Fen Road, CB6 1AL			23 September 1950	TL5374780394; 52°24′00″N 0°15′30″E		1262318	Upload Photo	Q26553202
29-33, West Fen Road	II	29-33, West Fen Road			19 June 1972	TL5350680498; 52°24′03″N 0°15′18″E		1262319	Upload Photo	Q26553203
Barn to Number 3	II	West Fen Road			12 December 1968	TL5375680378; 52°23′59″N 0°15′31″E		1252364	Upload Photo	Q26544239
Coach House and Stable Block to East of Number 1	II	West Fen Road			24 April 1986	TL5378680371; 52°23′59″N 0°15′32″E		1252453	Upload Photo	Q26544318
Lavender House	II	West Fen Road			19 June 1972	TL5368780435; 52°24′01″N 0°15′27″E		1252443	Upload Photo	Q26544310
Wall to Number 3	II	West Fen Road			19 June 1972	TL5373280402; 52°24′00″N 0°15′30″E		1252441	Upload Photo	Q26544308

== See also ==
- Grade I listed buildings in Cambridgeshire
- Grade II* listed buildings in Cambridgeshire

== Sources ==
- Pevsner, Nikolaus (1977) [1954], The buildings of England: Cambridgeshire (2nd ed.), Penguin books, ISBN 0-14-071010-8
- Bradley, Simon; Pevsner, Nikolaus (2014) [1954], Cambridgeshire, The Buildings of England, New Haven and London: Yale University Press, ISBN 978-0-300-20596-1
- Hampson, Ethel M; Atkinson, T D (1953), "Chapter 2: City of Ely", in Pugh, Ralph B (ed.), The Victoria History of the Counties of England: A history of Cambridge and the Isle of Ely, vol. IV, London: for The University of London Institute of Historical Research by the Oxford University Press, pp. 27–89
- Marr, J E; Thomas, H D (1967) [1938], "Chapter 1: Geology", in Salzman, L F (ed.), The Victoria History of the Counties of England: Cambridgeshire and the Isle of Ely, vol. I, London: for The University of London Institute of Historical Research reprinted by Dawsons of Pall Mall, pp. 1–33
- Miller, Edward (1953), "Chapter 1: The Liberty of Ely", in Pugh, Ralph B (ed.), The Victoria History of the Counties of England: A history of Cambridge and the Isle of Ely, vol. IV, London: for The University of London Institute of Historical Research by the Oxford University Press, pp. 1–27
