= George Freeman (politician) =

British Conservative politician

George Freeman MP
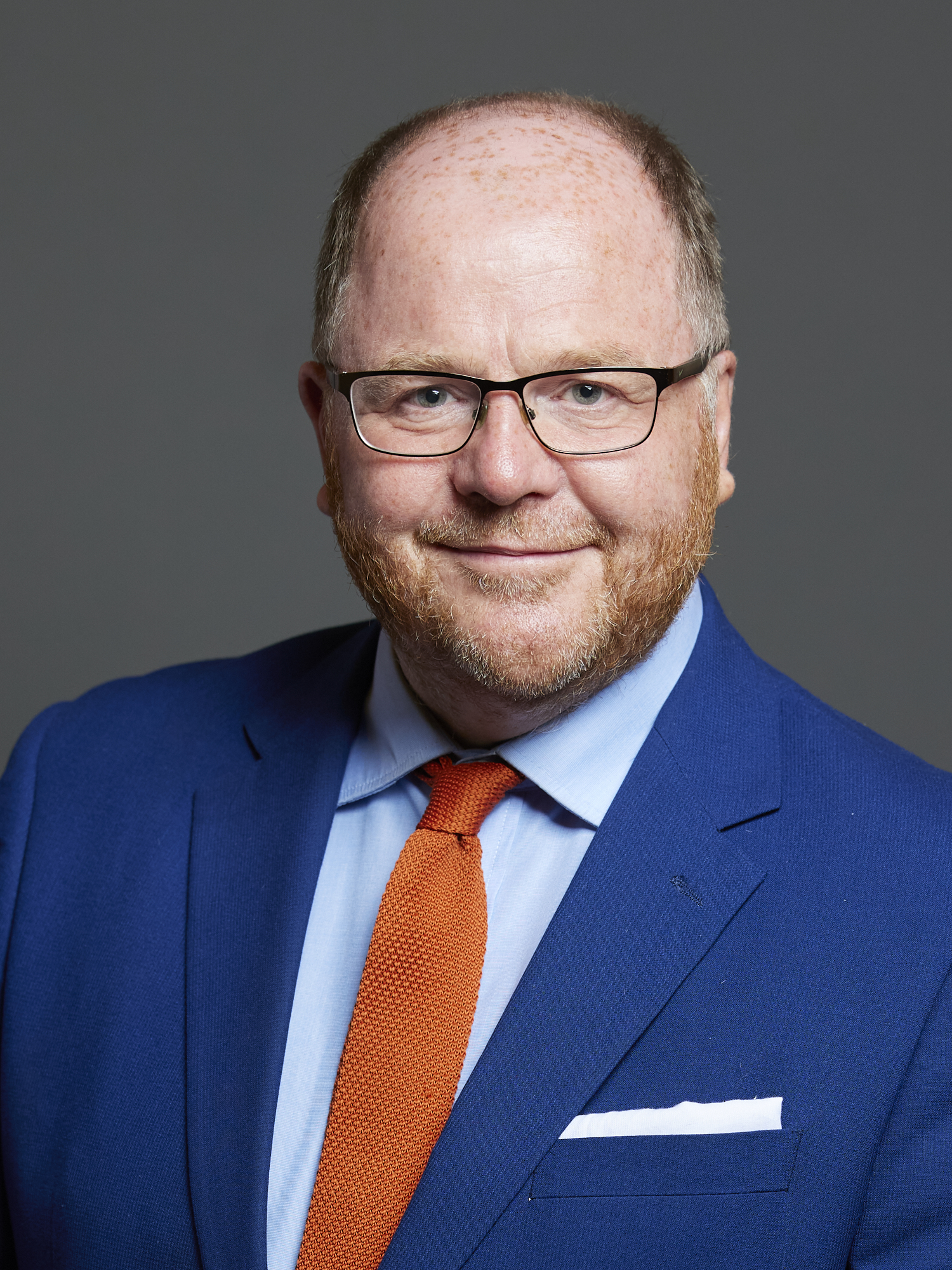
- Official portrait, 2024

Minister of State for Science, Research and Innovation (Note: Parliamentary Under-Secretary of State for Science, Research and Innovation (September 2021 – July 2022))
- In office 26 October 2022 – 13 November 2023
- Prime Minister: Rishi Sunak
- Preceded by: Nus Ghani
- Succeeded by: Andrew Griffith
- In office 17 September 2021 – 7 July 2022
- Prime Minister: Boris Johnson
- Preceded by: Amanda Solloway
- Succeeded by: Nus Ghani

Minister of State for Transport
- In office 26 July 2019 – 13 February 2020
- Prime Minister: Boris Johnson
- Preceded by: Michael Ellis
- Succeeded by: Andrew Stephenson

Parliamentary Under-Secretary of State for Life Sciences
- In office 15 July 2014 – 15 July 2016
- Prime Minister: David Cameron
- Preceded by: Office established
- Succeeded by: Nicola Blackwood

Member of Parliament for Mid Norfolk
- Incumbent
- Assumed office 6 May 2010
- Preceded by: Keith Simpson
- Majority: 3,054 (6.7%)

Personal details
- Born: George William Freeman; 12 July 1967 (age 59) Cambridge, England
- Party: Conservative
- Spouses: Eleanor Holmes (m. 1996; div. 2016); Fiona Laird (m. 2020)
- Children: 2
- Education: Girton College, Cambridge (BA)
- Website: georgefreeman.co.uk

George Freeman (born 12 July 1967) is a British Conservative Party politician serving as the Member of Parliament (MP) for Mid Norfolk since 2010. He previously served as Minister for Science, Research and Innovation from September 2021 until his resignation in July 2022, and again from October 2022 until November 2023.

== Early life ==
Freeman was born at Cambridge in 1967 to jockey Arthur Freeman and Joanna Stockbridge. He counts 19th-century Prime Minister William Ewart Gladstone as his great-great-great-uncle, and the actress and politician Mabel Philipson as his great-aunt. His parents divorced soon after he was born, and he had no contact with his father until he reached adulthood, growing up as a ward of court. Freeman later bought at auction the trophy his father received as winner of the 1958 Grand National.

He was privately educated at Radley College before enrolling at Girton College, Cambridge, from where he graduated with a Geography degree in 1989. After university, Freeman worked in Westminster as a lobbyist for the National Farmers' Union. Before entering Parliament, he had a career in biomedical venture capital for fifteen years, during which he founded and financed four biomedical start-ups.

== Political career ==
Freeman stood unsuccessfully as PPC for Stevenage at the 2005 general election. Then added to the Conservative A-List, he was selected for Mid Norfolk in October 2006.

Freeman was elected at the 2010 general election as MP for Mid Norfolk. The previous MP, Keith Simpson, contested the neighbouring Broadland constituency instead.

Shortly after entering Parliament, Freeman was elected Chairman of the All Party Group on Science and Technology in Agriculture. He was appointed Parliamentary Private Secretary to the Minister for Climate Change, Greg Barker, in the Coalition Government's first tranche of appointments and in July 2011, Freeman was appointed Government Life Science Advisor.

After a number of accidents on the A47 road in his constituency, Freeman campaigned for investment in safety. The road was included in a programme of investment announced in December 2014.

In 2014, he was appointed Parliamentary Under-Secretary of State for Life Sciences at the Department of Health and the Department for Business, Innovation and Skills. The role had not previously existed in any country. Freeman was nicknamed "High Tech Hezza", after Michael Heseltine whose former office he occupied while minister. During this role, Freeman was criticised by Labour opponents for describing use of prosecutions to enforce the minimum wage as "the politics of envy". In 2015, he asked the Medicines and Healthcare products Regulatory Agency to establish an enquiry into disabilities caused by hormone pregnancy tests.

Freeman is a co-founder of the 2020 Group of Conservative MPs, which he described as the "radical progressive centre ground" of the Conservative Party.

In 2017, Freeman criticised a tribunal ruling that people with extreme anxiety who struggle to leave the house should have the same legal status as the partially sighted, saying that the former were not "really disabled". After criticism from opposition MPs, disability charity Scope, and the Equality and Human Rights Commission, he said that he regretted if his comment "inadvertently caused any offence which was not intended", and that he did not "need any lectures on the damage anxiety does" after childhood experience of anxiety and depression.

Freeman chaired the Prime Minister's Policy Board until his resignation in November 2017. He warned the party not to be defined by "nostalgia, hard Brexit, public sector austerity and lazy privilege". In September 2018, he called for Prime Minister Theresa May's resignation once a deal on the UK's departure from the European Union was secured through Parliament. He said he would stand to be her successor if supported by his party, before ruling out the possibility shortly afterward.

Freeman founded The Big Tent Ideas Festival in 2017, with a view to connecting the Conservative Party with younger people following Jeremy Corbyn's appearance at Glastonbury Festival that summer. He called the event a "Tory Glastonbury". In 2018, he changed the festival to be "non-party political so that MPs, peers and others from the centre left can also get involved", and claimed that "for a generation under 40 the traditional party conference is as dead as a dodo".

On 26 July 2019, at the beginning of the first Johnson ministry, Freeman was appointed Minister of State at the Department for Transport. leaving Government at the Cabinet reshuffle in February 2020.

In February 2021, Freeman apologised for breaking the Advisory Committee on Business Appointments' financial conflict-of-interest rules after he took paid work from Aerosol Shield, a company trying to sell PPE to the NHS during the COVID-19 pandemic.

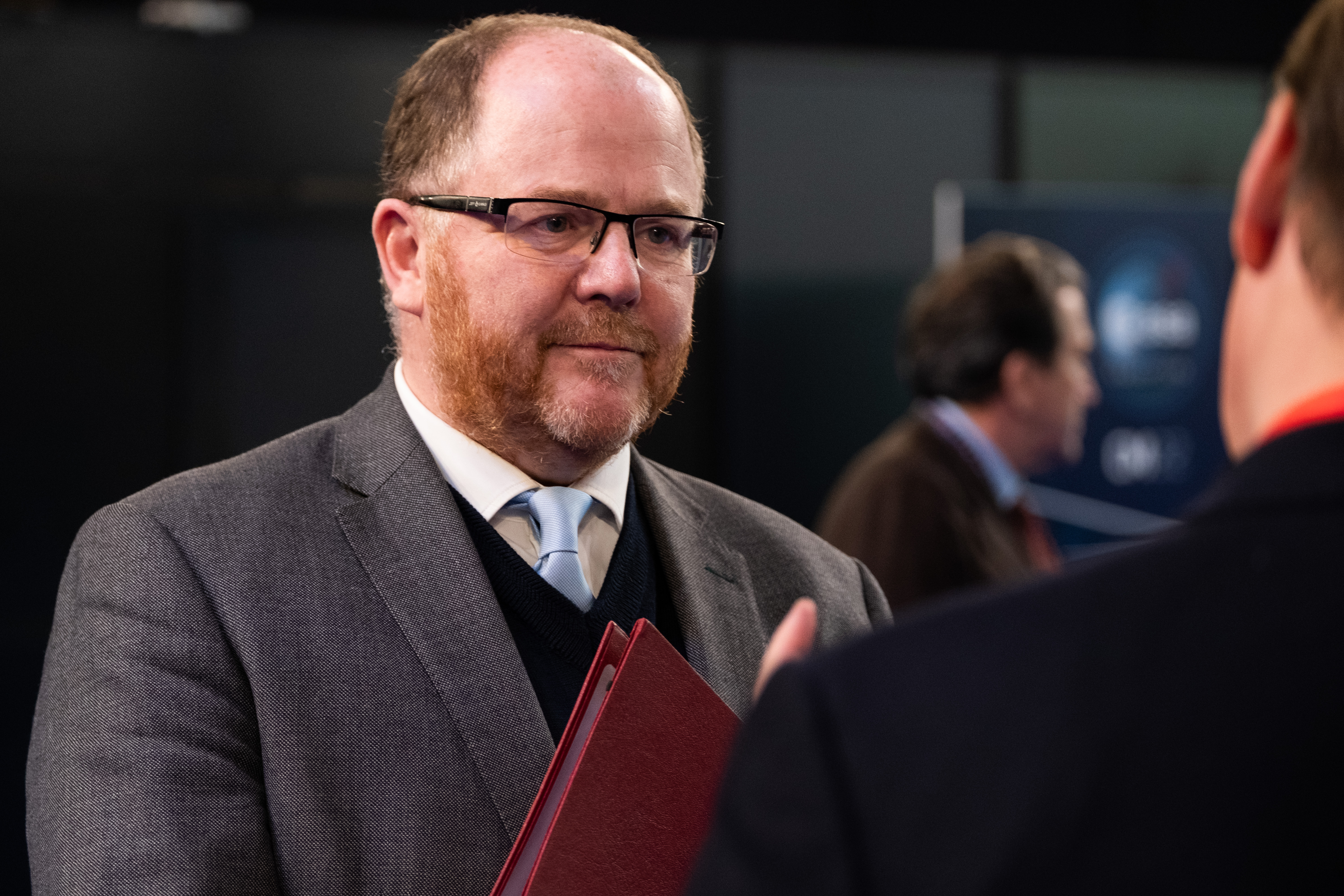
Freeman at the triennial 2022 European Space Agency ministerial meeting in Paris

On 17 September 2021, Freeman returned to Government as Parliamentary Under-Secretary of State for Science, Research and Innovation at the Department for Business, Energy and Industrial Strategy, during the second Cabinet reshuffle of the second Johnson ministry. In May 2022, he was on the advisory board of Bright Blue, a liberal conservative think tank, as well as think tanks Radix and Reform. He resigned from his ministerial office on 7 July 2022 during the government crisis that month.

During the October 2022 Conservative Party leadership election, Freeman initially supported Penny Mordaunt, but later said that "given the urgent need for Conservative stability and unity this week, I'm urging her to join and back Rishi Sunak today".

On 26 October 2022, at the beginning of the Sunak ministry, Freeman was reappointed Minister of State for Science, Research and Innovation.

During a Commons debate in March 2023, Freeman alleged that in 2014, the Chinese genomics firm BGI Group had made multiple attempts each week to "hack" into Genomics England, and that the firm remained "one of those danger points in the ecosystem." BGI had been given an £11 million COVID testing contract in 2021 and had also shared data with UK universities and the Wellcome Trust. Hours later, government sources stated that "there is no evidence of attempted hacking of Genomics England in 2014 from BGI. However, like most organisations they do receive regular attempts to access their systems, for which there are appropriate defences in place. No successful breaches have occurred." BGI Group stated; "we are incredulous at this statement. BGI Group has never been, and will never be, involved in 'hack attacks' against anyone." Freeman later requested that the Hansard record of his statement should be amended to state that "there is no evidence of attempted hacking of Genomics England in 2014 from BGI."

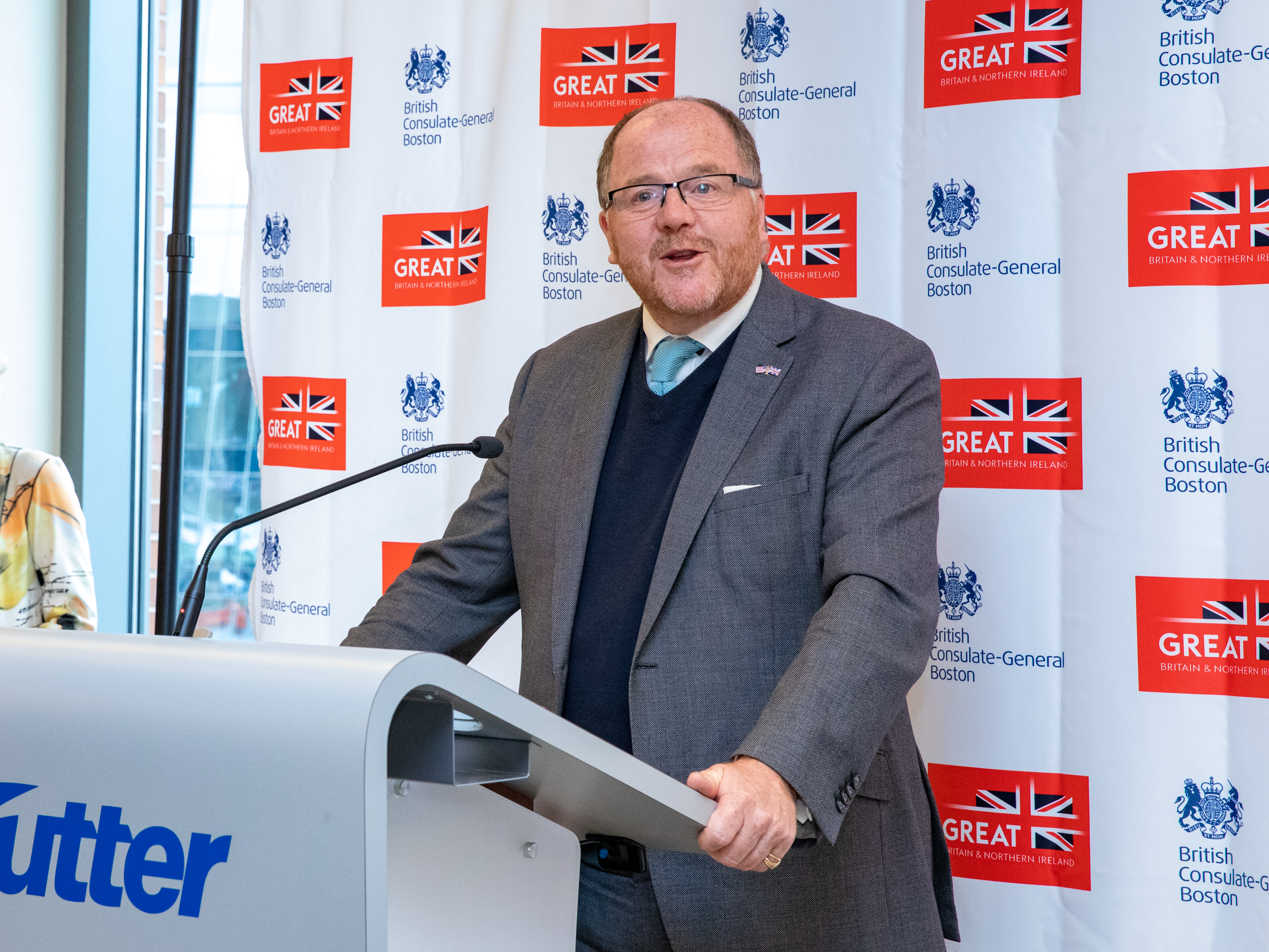
Freeman at the British Consulate-General in Boston in 2023

On 13 November 2023 as part of a cabinet reshuffle, Freeman resigned, citing a need to focus on his "health, family well-being and life beyond the front bench." He had already informed the chief whip of his decision in September. Freeman later stated that he had quit because he "couldn't afford" a rise in his mortgage rates from £800 to £2000 per calendar month on his £118,300 ministerial salary. He was criticised by some of his constituents and other voters for the move, though was defended by the Mid Norfolk Conservative Association.

Freeman was re-elected, for a fifth term, in the July 2024 general election, with his majority significantly reduced from 22,594 to 3,054.

In June 2025, Freeman referred himself to the Parliamentary Commissioner for Standards following allegations that an environmental monitoring company he advised, GHGSat, helped him draft parliamentary questions related to its sector. The company paid him £60,000 a year to do so. The Commissioner found no case to answer.

In October 2025, a video depicting Freeman announcing he was defecting to Reform UK began to circulate. Freeman denounced the video as 'an AI-generated deepfake' and the situation is currently being investigated by police.

== Personal life ==
Freeman was married to Eleanor Holmes from 1996 to 2016, and has two children. In 2020 Freeman married theatre director Fiona Laird.

In 2018 Freeman set up The Bridge of Hope, a charity in memory of his father, in an attempt to establish "a mechanism for taking those who had taken a fall in life, whether from injury, disability, mental illness, addiction, crime, debt, homelessness and giving them a second chance".

== Notes ==
Parliament of the United Kingdom
Preceded by Keith Simpson	Member of Parliament for Mid Norfolk; 2010–present	Incumbent
Political offices
Office established	Parliamentary Under-Secretary of State for Life Sciences; 2014–2016	Succeeded by Nicola Blackwood
Office established	Minister of State for Transport; 2019–2020	Succeeded by Andrew Stephenson
Preceded by Amanda Solloway	Minister of State of State for Science, Research and Innovation; 2021–2023	Succeeded by Andrew Griffith
