= Fiona Laird =

British theatre director

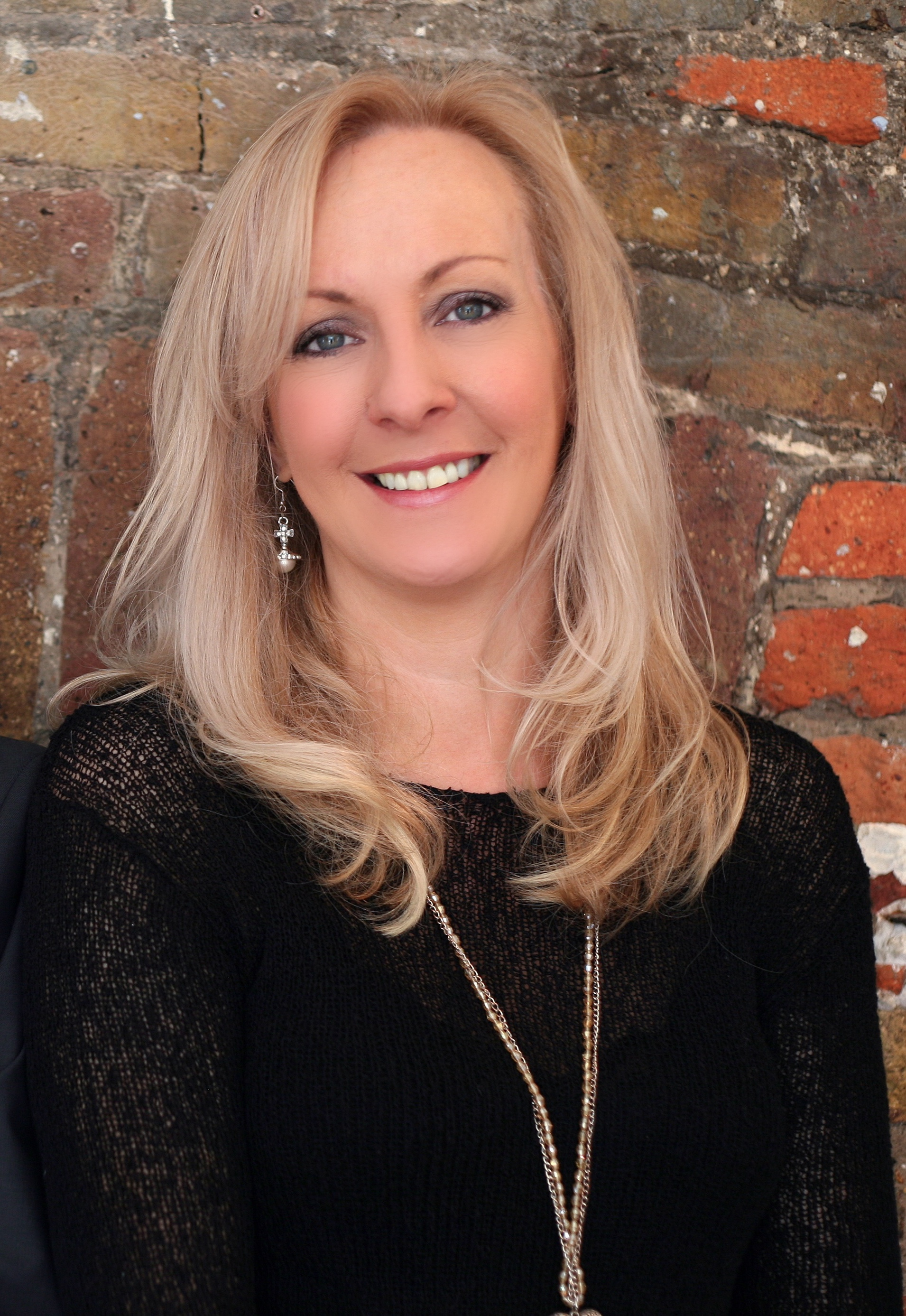
- Occupations: Director, writer, composer

Fiona Laird is a British theatre, television, and radio director, artist, and a writer, composer, and lyricist. In 2013, responding to UK cuts in performing arts education, Laird founded the National Youth Theatre Arts Trust.

== Biography ==
Laird grew up in Ely, Cambridgeshire, where her father was a schoolmaster and her mother a musician. She attended King's Ely and holds a BA in Philosophy from University College London.

On leaving UCL she founded The London Small Theatre Company and toured Europe and the USA with for five years, including a run off-Broadway during which time she lived at The Chelsea Hotel, and an appearance at the Pan-European Festival of Greek Drama in Delphi. She disbanded the theatre company in 1992 and went to work as staff director at the National Theatre where she assisted John Caird on his productions of Trelawny of the 'Wells' and The Seagull, and Declan Donnellan on his productions of Angels in America and Sweeney Todd. During this time Laird also assisted Declan Donnellan on his production of As You Like It.

Laird left the National in 1995 and went on to direct Penny Blue by Vanessa Brooks at Greenwich Theatre, then Black Comedy and The Public Eye by Peter Shaffer, Happy Families by John Godber, and Schippel the Plumber, all at the Watford Palace Theatre.

Laird then returned to the National in 1996 to direct a production of her own translation of Aristophanes' The Frogs, which toured the UK and played in the Cottesloe Theatre. In 1997 she directed the revival of Richard Eyre's production of Guys and Dolls at the National and in 1998 she directed Oh, What a Lovely War! for the National. her production transferred to the Roundhouse later that year.

Since that time Laird has directed plays for the Royal Shakespeare Company, the Royal National Theatre, The Old Vic, the Royal Court Theatre, the Royal Festival Hall, and the Welsh National Opera. Productions include Stephen Fry's Cinderella at the Old Vic, and the Royal Shakespeare Company's 2018 production of The Merry Wives of Windsor, for which she also composed the music.

In 2009, Laird directed the live television performance of The Turning Point by Michael Dobbs, starring Benedict Cumberbatch as spy Guy Burgess. The production was part of the Sky Arts Theatre Live! Series, which won the Broadcasting Press Guild Best Multichannel Programme Award.

In 2018 Laird's production of The Merry Wives of Windsor played at the Royal Shakespeare Theatre in Stratford-upon-Avon and at the Barbican Theatre as part of the 2018 Royal Shakespeare Company.

In 2025 she directed The Play's The Thing: A One Person Hamlet (which she also edited the text for) at Wilton's Music Hall, supported by the National Theatre; the actor was her ex-husband Mark Lockyer.

Laird has written on feminism, and theatre, and politics for The Guardian, The Times, CapX, Reaction, and has appeared many times on Front Row and Loose Ends.

== Theatre direction ==
- Beyond Belief and The Clouds Off-Broadway, New York
- Beyond Belief and The Clouds, Pan-European Festival of Greek Drama, Delphi Greece (prize-winner)
- Beyond Belief - West End
- The Frogs (1996) - The Royal National Theatre (also translator, composer, and lyricist)
- Black Comedy and The Public Eye (1996) - Watford Palace Theatre
- Oh What a Lovely War! (1998) - The Royal National Theatre
- High Society (2001) - Sheffield Crucible
- Twenty Men Singing (2007) - for the Welsh National Opera
- The Wasps (2015) - a new adaptation by Laird from Aristophanes' original play - Almeida Theatre
- The Merry Wives of Windsor (2018) - Royal Shakespeare Company (also composer)

== Cinema and television direction ==
- Musicool (2007) - reality TV musical
- Theatre Live! (2009) - theatrical production broadcast live
- The Merry Wives of Windsor (2018) - recording of the 2018 Royal Shakespeare Company theatrical production

== Personal life ==
Laird's first marriage was with the actor Mark Lockyer. In 2020 she married Conservative MP George Freeman.
