= William Patterson (cricketer, born 1854) =

English cricketer (1854–1939)

William Seeds Patterson (19 March 1854 – 20 October 1939) was an English cricketer who played first-class cricket for Cambridge University, Lancashire and various amateur teams between 1874 and 1882. He was born at Mossley Hill, Liverpool and died at Hook Heath, Woking, Surrey.

Patterson was educated at Uppingham School, where he was captain of the cricket eleven and was coached by the famous cricketer H. H. Stephenson, and Trinity College, Cambridge. As a cricketer, he was a right-handed middle order batsman and a right-arm slow bowler. At Cambridge, he made an early impression as a batsman by scoring 147 in the freshmen's trial match of 1874. That brought him into the university first eleven for much of the summer, playing largely as a batsman, often opening the innings, and he scored 86 in his third game, the home match against Surrey. But he lost form and was not in the side for the 1874 University Match against Oxford University; he was also not successful in a couple of matches for Lancashire later in the season.

Greater use was made in 1875 of Patterson's bowling, and he was also more consistent as a batsman, playing as a middle- or lower-order batsman; in the University Match, he took three Oxford wickets in each innings and scored 12 and 18, but Cambridge lost the match by just six runs. There was further improvement in both batting and bowling in 1876. Against the Gentlemen of England side, in a 12-a-side match, he took 11 wickets in the match with 7 for 64 in the first innings. In the 1876 University Match, Patterson shared the first-innings wickets with his Uppingham School fast-bowling colleague, Henry Luddington, taking five for 42, and then scored an unbeaten 105 in the Cambridge innings, for less than a day the highest innings in the University Match series – Oxford's captain William Game scored 109 in his second innings – and the only century of Patterson's first-class career. He was then picked for the Gentlemen side in the Gentlemen v Players match at Prince's Cricket Ground, where he took seven wickets (though W. G. Grace took 10). By the end of the season, in only eight first-class games, Patterson had taken 52 wickets.

Patterson was one of the leading bowlers of the 1877 season, taking 80 wickets in 11 first-class games. He was captain of the Cambridge University team and again shared Oxford's first-innings wickets with Luddington in the University Match, though an innings of 117 not out by Francis Buckland won the game easily for Oxford. There were five players from Uppingham School in the Cambridge team under Patterson, all of whom had been coached by Stephenson: The Times in its obituary of Patterson in 1939 wrote that, though Eton, Harrow or Winchester might have supplied this number of cricketers to a university team in the early days of the University Match, "since the game became more generally known and played by the public schools, this record has not been equalled". At the end of the Cambridge term, Patterson played twice in Gentlemen v Players matches. In the second of these, at Lord's, he took seven Players' wickets for 58 runs in the first innings and then, batting at No 11 in a very strong batting line-up, joined Fred Grace with nine Gentlemen wickets down for 97 runs and a further 46 required for victory: Grace scored 23 and Patterson 24, both not out, to secure the win "amid great applause".

After graduating from Cambridge in 1877, Patterson went into business and had little time for cricket; he later served on the Mersey Docks and Harbour Board. He played a few matches for Lancashire in 1877, 1878 and 1882, a couple in Philadelphia in 1880 and 1881 and one for Liverpool and District in 1882; thereafter there were minor matches in Liverpool and in the United States up to 1888. In later life, he wrote a history of cricket at Uppingham School.
