= Henry Luddington =

English cricketer (1854–1922)

Personal information
- Full name: Henry Tansley Luddington
- Born: 9 December 1854; Littleport, Cambridgeshire, England
- Died: 12 April 1922 (aged 67); Ashdon, Essex, England
- Batting: Right-handed
- Bowling: Right-arm roundarm fast

Domestic team information
- Years: Team
- 1876–1877: Cambridge University

Career statistics
Competition	First-class
Matches	11
Runs scored	76
Batting average	6.90
100s/50s	–/–
Top score	25
Balls bowled	1,917
Wickets	42
Bowling average	19.80
5 wickets in innings	3
10 wickets in match	–
Best bowling	2/28
Catches/stumpings	4/–
- Source: Cricinfo, 25 March 2021

Henry Tansley Luddington (9 December 1854 – 14 April 1922) was an English cricketer who played first-class cricket for Cambridge University and the "Gentlemen of England" side in the 1870s. He was born at Littleport, Cambridgeshire and died at Ashdon, Essex.

Luddington was educated at Uppingham School, where he was coached by the famous cricketer H. H. Stephenson, at King's Ely and at Jesus College, Cambridge. He had a trial match for the Cambridge University cricket team in 1874, but did not get into the first eleven until 1876 when he achieved some success with his right-arm fast bowling, delivering the ball round arm. His batting as a right-handed tail-ender was negligible. Picked for the 1876 University Match against Oxford University, he took 5 for 51 in the first innings and 4 for 72 in the second as Cambridge won by seven wickets; in the first innings, he shared the Oxford wickets with William Patterson, with whom he had been at school at Uppingham. Luddington's best bowling performance came for Cambridge in 1877 against the Marylebone Cricket Club: he took 5 for 28 as MCC, including W. G. Grace, were dismissed for just 60. In the 1877 University Match, Luddington and Patterson again shared the Oxford first-innings wickets equally, Luddington taking 5 for 90, but Oxford won the match easily. After leaving Cambridge, Luddington played only one further first-class match, appearing for the Gentlemen of England in a fixture at Cambridge in 1878.

Luddington appears not to have followed any career after graduating from Cambridge in 1877; he was a Justice of the Peace and a county councillor for the Isle of Ely after that district achieved county status with local government reform in 1888. He bought Walton's Park at Ashdon on the Essex/Cambridgeshire border in 1917 and died there five years later.
