= 2020 group =

UK Conservative parliamentary group

The 2020 group is a grouping of around 40 centre-right Conservative MPs in the United Kingdom.

The 2020 group was set up by Greg Barker and George Freeman in 2011 to provide a Parliamentary forum for Conservative MPs from the progressive centre ground. Seeking to draw on the career experiences and insights of newly elected MPs, and focusing on the longer-term social and economic changes and challenges confronting the intake – rather than the traditional 'silos' of Whitehall portfolios – the group sought to develop a number of policy 'themes' and ideas. Some of these ideas were later represented in the 2015 Conservative Manifesto.

In its mission statement, the group claims that two of the most urgent problems facing the United Kingdom – the need to "unleash more enterprise and innovation" across the economy, and to tackle "entrenched welfarism and social inequality" – are fundamentally linked. It advocates an Enterprise Economy in partnership with greater Social Mobility, praising the role of technology and enterprise in creating new opportunities to tackle these issues and rejecting "the stale dogmas of both old left and right in the search for solutions for our generation".

Re-elected with a Conservative majority in 2015, the group continues to develop themes for the new intake of Conservative MPs, defining what its calls "a One Nation Conservatism for the 21st Century".

The Group was described by Michael Crick as a "Cameron supporters club" when David Cameron was Prime Minister. They were reported as planning to start a website to challenge Conservative Home.
