= Richard Everitt (producer) =

British television producer and director

Richard Everitt (28 July 1933 – 1 September 2004) was a British television producer and occasional director. He produced TV programmes from 1963 to 1991, including Coronation Street (1965) and Lovejoy (1986). He attended King's Ely.
