= William Brown (headmaster) =

Revd William Martyn Brown (1914–2005) was Headmaster of King's Ely, and Head Master of Bedford School.

== Biography ==
Born on 12 July 1914, William Brown was educated at Bedford School and at Pembroke College, Cambridge, where he was a Scholar and gained a first class degree in Modern Languages. He taught at Wellington College, Berkshire, between 1936 and 1947, was Headmaster of King's Ely, between 1947 and 1955, and Head Master of Bedford School, between 1955 and 1975. He was ordained in 1976 and became Parish Priest in the parishes of Field Dalling and Saxlingham in Norfolk, between 1977 and 1984, and Rural Dean of Holt, Norfolk, between 1984 and 1988.

Described by The Times as "a first-class headmaster of two schools", Revd William Brown died on 14 December 2005.
