= Rupert Sanderson =

British shoe designer (born 1966)

Rupert Sanderson (born 1966) is a British shoe designer.

== Early life and education ==
Rupert Sanderson was born in Penang, Malaysia. His father was a British Army Officer and the family moved frequently. Sanderson attended King's Ely and later graduated from Royal Holloway and Bedford New College, London University. He spent 9 years in advertising before enrolling in the shoe-making course at Cordwainers College in East London.

== Career ==
Sanderson moved to Italy after graduation and worked first for Sergio Rossi and later Bruno Magli.

In 2001, he moved back to London and launched his label, starting with a collection of 15 shoes. In 2006, Sanderson bought a controlling interest in the shoe factory that produced his first collection, located on the outskirts of Bologna, Italy.

In 2008, he established Fashion Fringe Shoes with Colin McDowell's Fashion Fringe organization. That same year, he designed shoes for Peter Handke’s The Hour We Knew Nothing of Each Other at the National Theatre. In 2010, he designed shoes for The Royal Opera's Aida for a cast of over 200 people.

In 2015, he designed a limited-edition charitable collection for the Minions film franchise, worn by Sandra Bullock at the movie's premiere.

Sanderson has collaborated with designers Karl Lagerfeld, Antonio Berardi, Louise Goldin, Shrimps, and Huishan Zhang.

== Personal life ==
Sanderson is married to publishing professional Rowan Routh. They have four children together. He lives in Tufnell Park in north London.

== Achievements and awards ==
- 2008: British Fashion Council Accessory Designer of the Year
- 2009: Elle Style Awards Accessory Designer of the Year

== Collaborations ==
- 2008 – Louise Goldin (SS09)
- 2009 – Karl Lagerfeld (AW09)
- 2010 – Karl Lagerfeld (SS10 and AW10)
- 2010 – The Royal Opera's Aida - Giuseppe Verdi
