= Bishop's Palace, Ely =

Grade I listed building in East Cambridgeshire, United Kingdom

Coordinates: 52.3986°N 0.2614°E

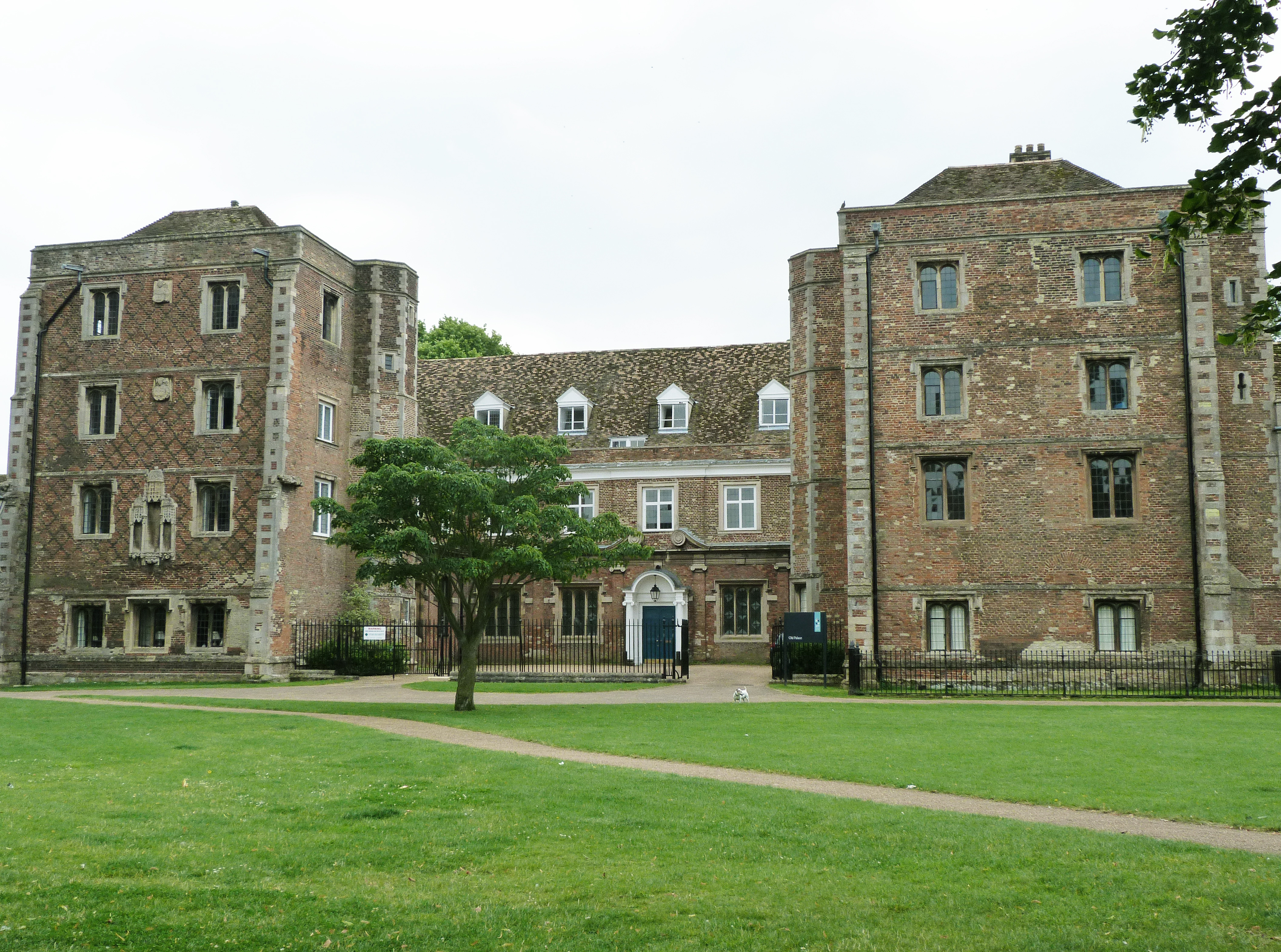
The Bishop's Palace (July 2012)

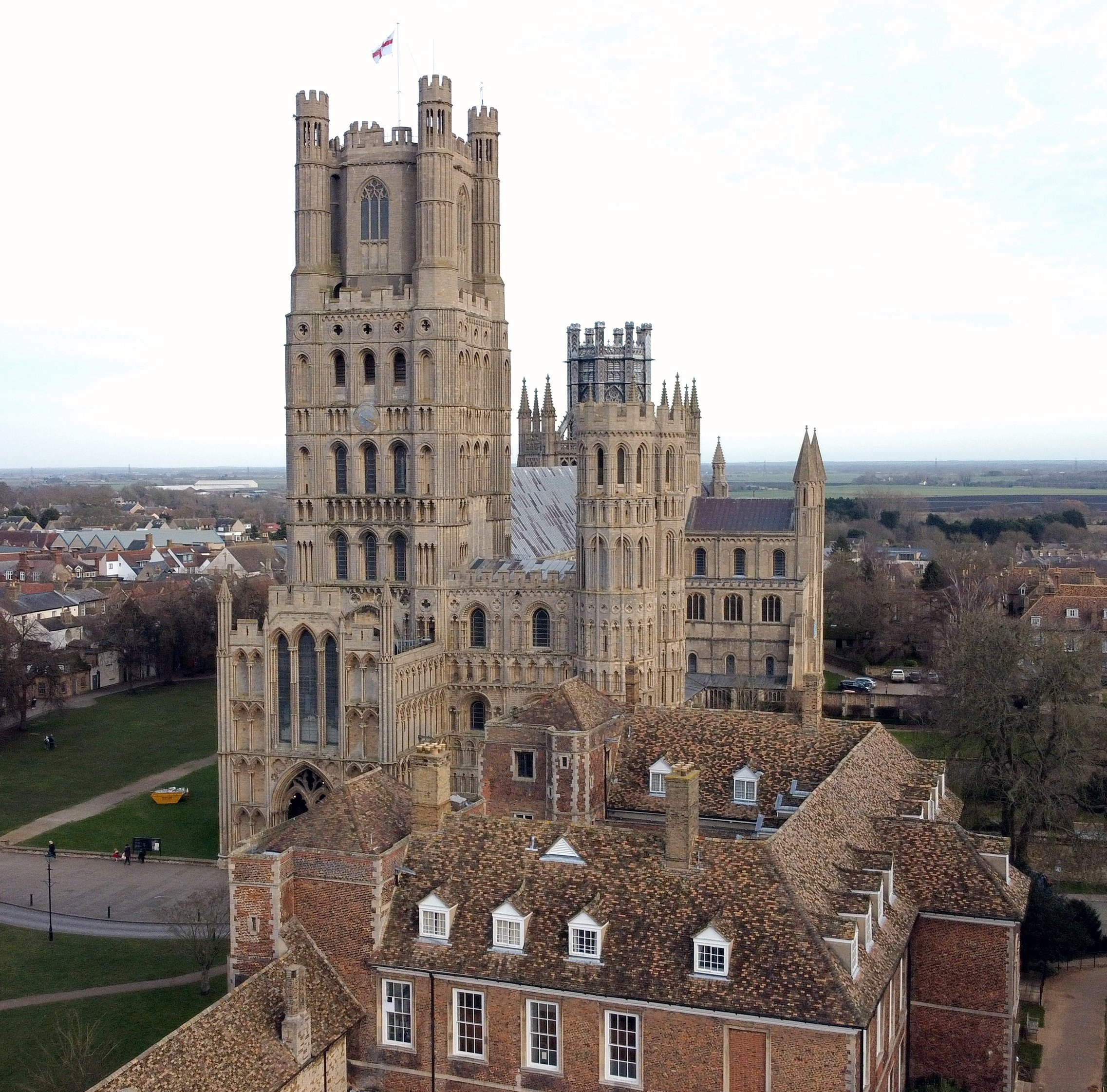
Bishop's Palace (foreground) with Ely Cathedral in the background (January 2022)

The Bishop's Palace, Ely was one of the residences of the Bishop of Ely from the 15th century until 1941. It is a Grade I listed building.

The palace was built in the 15th century by Bishop John Alcock; however, just two towers from the original building remain. He also completed the bishop's palace (now Wisbech Castle) at Wisbech (where he died in 1500). Bishops over the following centuries expanded and remodelled the palace.

During the Second World War the palace was used as a base for the British Red Cross and after this period it became a home for disabled children until its closure in the 1980s. Following this, the palace was purchased on a 99 years lease by the Sue Ryder Care organization although the palace went up for sale again in 2010. Later that year, local public school, King's Ely took over the lease from Sue Ryder Care and refurbished the palace to become the school new sixth form centre. It was opened by the Prince Richard, Duke of Gloucester on Friday 25 January 2013.
