= Gytha Lodge =

Author

- Born: January 1984 (age 42)
- Education: King's Ely
- Alma mater: University of Cambridge; University of East Anglia (MA)
- Writing career
- Notable work: DCI Jonah Sheen Series
- Notable awards: Sunday Times Best Seller (She Lies in Wait)

Gytha Lodge is a playwright, novelist and writer for Video games and screen, best known for the DCI Jonah Sheens series of novels.

== Education ==
She attended King's Ely, in Cambridgeshire, Corpus Christi College, Cambridge, reading English, and the University of East Anglia, gaining an MA in Creative writing.

== Personal life ==
Lodge lives in Cambridge with her son.

== Bibliography ==
=== DCI Jonah Sheens series ===
- She Lies in Wait (March 2019)
- Watching from the Dark (February 2020)
- Lie Beside Me (March 2021)
- Little Sister (April 2022)
- A Killer in the Family (April 2023)

== Recognition ==
Her first book, She Lies in Wait, is a Sunday Times Bestseller and was recommended by the Richard & Judy Book Club.
