= British Consulate-General, Boston =

British diplomatic outpost in the U.S.

- Location: (United States) Cambridge, Massachusetts
- Address: One Broadway, Seventh Floor

The British Consulate-General Boston is an outpost of the British diplomatic mission to the United States serving the six New England states. Originally based in Boston proper, the modern Consulate relocated across the Charles River to the Kendall Square innovation district bordering the Massachusetts Institute of Technology. The Consulate was founded in 1817 and is one of the oldest diplomatic offices in the United States. The present Consul General is David Clay MBE.

== History ==
Like its sister posts across the United States, the Consulate serves as a regional outpost for the British Embassy located in Washington, DC. The Boston office was opened during the reestablishment of normal diplomatic relations between the US and UK following the War of 1812. It was tasked with managing British nationals and interests in the former New England colonies, and was upgraded from a standard Consulate to a Consul-General in 1904. Before moving to Cambridge, it occupied offices throughout downtown Boston including the Prudential Tower, 220 Clarendon Street, and the Federal Reserve Bank of Boston.

== Structure ==
Day-to-day operations at the Consulate are divided between personnel working under the Foreign and Commonwealth Office and those serving the Department for International Trade. Foreign Office staff cover press relations, political reporting, cultural affairs, consular services, scientific outreach, and academic consultation. International Trade staff manage trading relationships and business development for New England firms expanding operations to the UK and British firms expanding operations to New England.

== Leadership ==
The Consulate-General is managed by a Consul General appointed by the Foreign Office to represent the Government of the United Kingdom. The Consulate and its consul ultimately answer to the British Embassy in Washington and the British Ambassador to the United States.

Peter Abbott has been a member of Her Majesty’s Diplomatic Service since 2005. Before becoming British Consul General to New England in 2020, he served as Counsellor at the British High Commission in Islamabad, Pakistan, with operational oversight of the largest mission in the UK’s overseas diplomatic network.

Earlier in his career, Peter was the Private Secretary to the Ambassador, Sir Nigel Sheinwald, from 2008-2010.
