= Donald Kingaby =

British flying ace (1920–1990)

Donald Ernest Kingaby
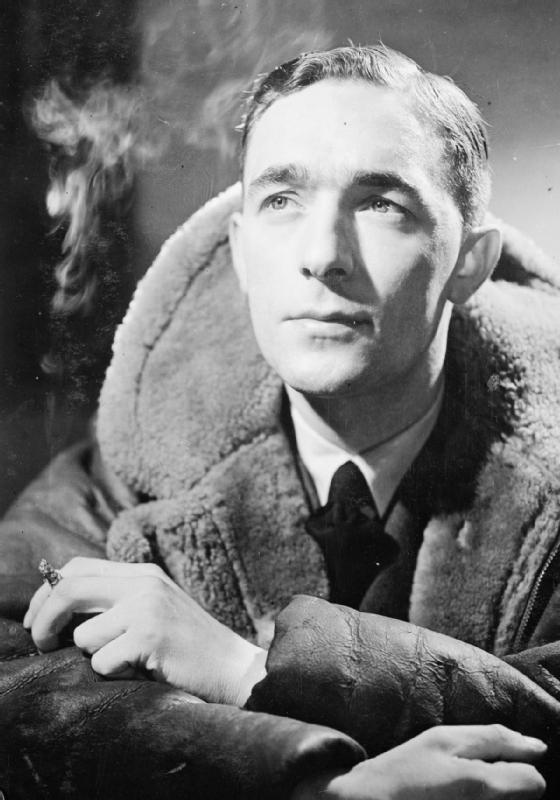
- Kingaby during the Second World War
- Born: 7 January 1920; Holloway, London, England
- Died: 31 December 1990 (aged 70); Westfield, Massachusetts, U.S.
- Military career
- Allegiance: United Kingdom
- Branch: Royal Air Force
- Service years: 1939–1958
- Rank: Wing Commander
- Nickname: Don
- Commands: No. 72 Squadron RAF (1949–52); Hornchurch Wing (1943); No. 122 Squadron RAF (1942–43)
- Conflicts: Second World War: Battle of Britain; Channel Front
- Awards: Distinguished Service Order; Air Force Cross; Distinguished Flying Medal & Two Bars; Distinguished Flying Cross (United States); Croix de guerre (Belgium)

Donald Ernest Kingaby, DSO, AFC, DFM & Two Bars (7 January 1920 – 31 December 1990) was a Royal Air Force (RAF) aviator and flying ace of the Second World War. He was the only person to be awarded the Distinguished Flying Medal three times.

During an operational career of some 300 operations, Kingaby scored 21 air victories against enemy aircraft, as well as two shared victories, six probables and 11 damaged during the war. 14 of his solo victories came against the Messerschmitt Bf 109.

== Early life ==
Kingaby was born in Holloway, London, on 7 January 1920, the son of clergyman. Before the war he worked for an insurance company. He attended King's Ely.

== RAF career ==
Kingaby joined the Royal Air Force Volunteer Reserve in April 1939 when 19 years old. In June 1940, as a sergeant pilot, he joined No. 266 Squadron flying the Supermarine Spitfire Mark I. During the initial stages of the Battle of Britain he damaged two Junkers Ju 88 bombers and a Bf 110 fighter before being transferred to No. 92 Squadron, in September 1940. A Bf 109 of 4./JG 26 was claimed on 30 September, while Kingaby claimed four enemy aircraft, (three Bf 109s) in the second half of October. In November he shot down six Bf 109s, four of them (including 1 'probable') in a single day on 15 November.

During 1941 RAF Fighter Command went onto the offensive with its fighter sweeps over occupied Europe. With 92 Squadron, Kingaby claimed a dozen more kills and was dubbed by the press the "109 specialist". On 22 November 1941, he was granted an emergency commission as a pilot officer (probationary), and rested from operations.

In March 1942 he was back on operations with No. 111 Squadron. That April, Kingaby joined No. 64 Squadron, with which he shot down another couple of German fighters. He was promoted to the war-substantive rank of flying officer on 30 June. Later in the year Kingaby was posted to No. 122 Squadron as flight commander and then squadron commander. On 20 January 1943 Kingaby shot down Unteroffizier Helmut Peters of 6 Staffel Jagdgeschwader 26 (JG 26), who was killed in action. On 2 February, he was promoted to flight lieutenant (war-substantive). In March, he was promoted to lead the "Hornchurch Wing".

After a rest period at Fighter Command HQ he was back as a wing leader in the summer of 1944 over the invasion beaches of France. His last kill was a share in a Bf 109 on 30 June, bringing his total to 21. On 24 July, he was promoted to the rank of squadron leader (war substantive), and was posted to the Advanced Gunnery School at RAF Catfoss, remaining there until the end of the war. An acting wing commander at the war's end, Kingaby was awarded the Distinguished Flying Cross from the United States Government on 15 May 1945, and the Croix de guerre from Belgium on 15 June.

After the war, Kingaby was granted a permanent commission as a flight lieutenant in the RAF on 29 November 1946, with seniority from 1 September 1945, but retained his war substantive rank of squadron leader until 1 January 1948, then spent a year as a flight lieutenant before being promoted to the permanent rank of squadron leader on 1 January 1949. From February 1949 until April 1952 he commanded No. 72 Squadron, flying the de Havilland Vampire. On 5 June 1952 he was awarded the Air Force Cross.

== Later life ==
He served in the RAF until his retirement on 29 September 1958, retaining the rank of wing commander. Kingaby subsequently moved to the United States, where he resided until his death in Massachusetts on New Year's Eve 1990.

== Awards and citations ==
Distinguished Flying Medal
745707 Sergeant Donald Ernest Kingaby, Royal Air Force Volunteer Reserve, No. 92 Squadron.

This airman has displayed great courage and tenacity in his attacks against the enemy. He has destroyed at least nine hostile aircraft, four of which he shot down in one day.

Bar to the Distinguished Flying Medal
745707 Sergeant Donald Ernest Kingaby, DFM, Royal Air Force Volunteer Reserve, No. 92 Squadron.

This airman pilot has continued to prove himself a very able section leader who fights with coolness and courage. He has now destroyed at least fourteen enemy aircraft and damaged others.

Second bar to the Distinguished Flying Medal
745707 Flight Sergeant Donald Ernest Kingaby, DFM, Royal Air Force Volunteer Reserve, No 92 Squadron.

This airman leads his section – and occasionally the flight, with great skill and courage. He has participated in 36 operational sorties during which he has destroyed 17, probably destroyed 6 and damaged a further 7 enemy aircraft. Flight Sergeant Kingaby has at all times displayed the greatest determination and sound judgment, combined with a high standard of operational efficiency.

Distinguished Service Order
Acting Squadron Leader Donald Ernest Kingaby, DFM, (112406), Royal Air Force Volunteer Reserve, No. 122 Squadron.

Squadron Leader Kingaby has taken part in more than 300 operational missions, a large number of which have been over enemy territory. Recently, he has led his wing in several engagements during which considerable losses have been inflicted on the enemy. Much of the success achieved can be attributed to Squadron Leader Kingaby's great skill and inspiring leadership. Since being awarded a second bar to the Distinguished Flying Medal he has destroyed 4 enemy aircraft, bringing his victories to 21.

Air Force Cross
Squadron Leader Donald Ernest Kingaby, DSO DFM, (112406), Royal Air Force.

No specific citation published in the London Gazette.
