= King's Ely =

Private school in Ely, Cambridgeshire, England

- Schola Regla Eliensis

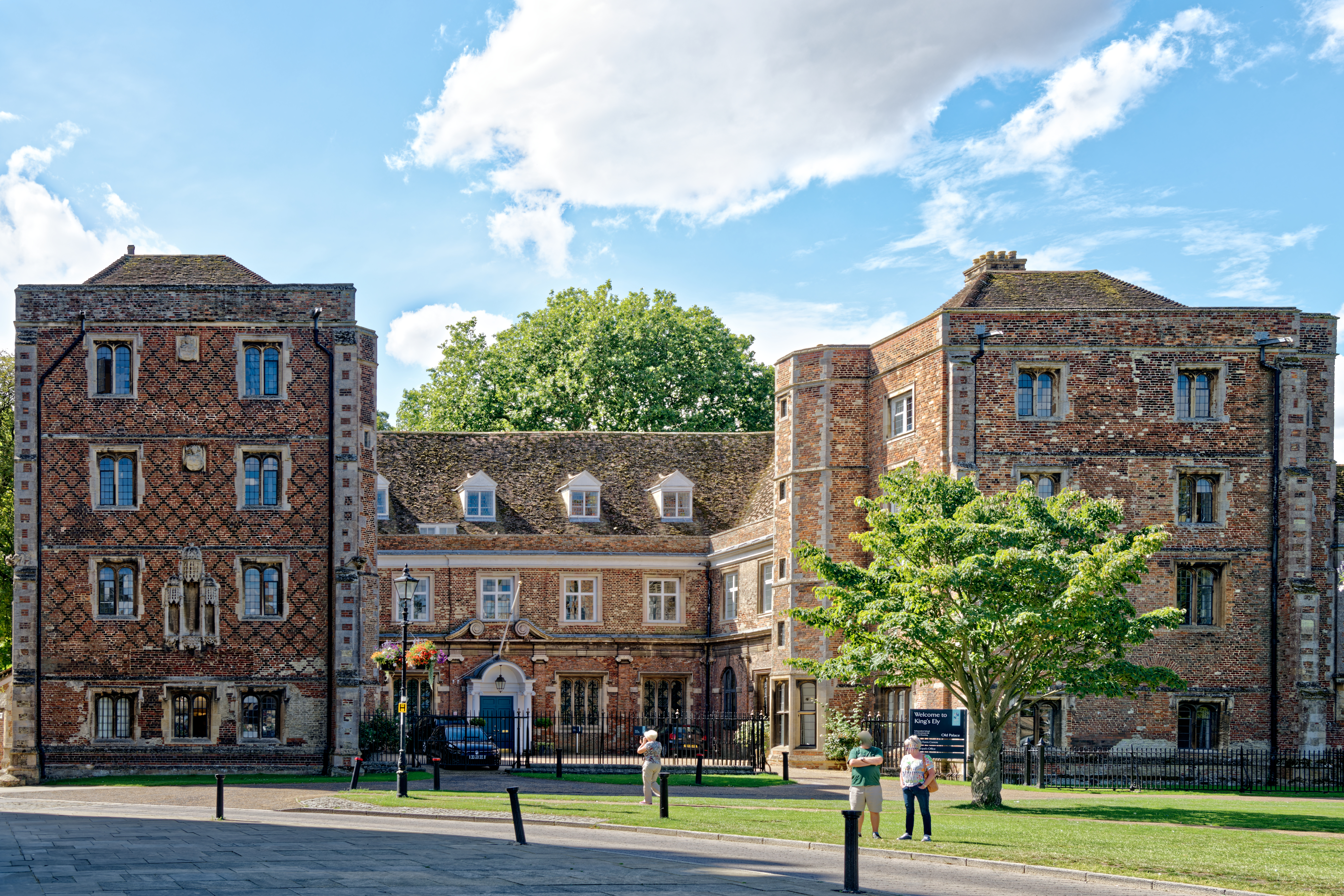
- The Bishop's Palace, Ely. Sixth form centre of King's Ely.

Location
- The Old Palace; Ely, Cambridgeshire, CB7 4EW; England; 52°23′52″N 0°15′42″E

Information
- Former names: Ely Cathedral Grammar School; The King's School, Ely; Queen Anne's School; The King's School, Ely (Again)
- Type: Private day and boarding Cathedral school
- Motto: Latin: Gratia Dei sum quod sum (I am what I am by the grace of God)
- Religious affiliation: Church of England
- Established: 970; 1056 years ago
- Founder: St Etheldreda (First version of the school, founded in 673; 1353 years ago) St Dunstan, Archbishop of Canterbury and Æthelwold, Bishop of Winchester (Founded the current version of the school in 970; 1056 years ago) King Henry VIII (refounded in 1541; 485 years ago)
- Local authority: Cambridgeshire
- Department for Education URN: 110916 Tables
- Chairman of the Governors: David Day
- Principal: John Attwater
- Vice-Principal (Academic): Jane Thomas
- Heads: Faye Fenton-Stone (Acremont); Simon Kibler (Prep); Jonathan Shaw (Senior)
- Chaplain: Vacant since 2025
- Staff: 220
- Employees: 472
- Gender: Coeducational
- Age: 2 to 18
- Enrolment: 1250 Students (1050 at King's Ely and 200 at Fairstead House)
- Student to teacher ratio: 5:1
- Campus size: 70 Acres
- Houses: 9 (Senior); 6 (Prep); 4 (Acremont)
- Colours: Navy and Duck Egg
- Publication: The Porta; The Elean; King's Sings; The KEStrel
- Alumni: Old Eleans
- School Hymn: Coe Fen, "How shall I sing that majesty?", Ken Naylor (1931-1991)
- Visitor: The Bishop of Ely
- Website: www.kingsely.org

King's Ely is an all through public school (English fee-charging day and boarding school) in the city of Ely in England. It was founded in 970 AD, making it one of the oldest schools in the world. It was given its first royal charter by King Henry VIII in 1541, its second by Queen Elizabeth I in 1562, and its third by King Charles II in 1666. The school consists of a nursery, a pre-preparatory school, a prep school, a senior school, a sixth form, and an international school. King's Ely is a member of the Headmasters' and Headmistresses' Conference. In 2021, The Independent Schools Inspectorate published their report writing that "King's Ely achieved the highest grading possible in every category inspected and was judged to meet or exceed all regulatory standards for independent day and boarding schools."

The school has produced a number of notable alumni, including Edward the Confessor, King of England, Lord Browne of Madingley, former chairman of BP, and James Bowman, countertenor.

King's Ely has featured in the local news for its sports results, and it has produced a bronze medal-winning Olympic athlete, Goldie Sayers, who won a Bronze Medal in the 2008 Summer Olympics. Much of the senior school uses the historic monastic buildings of the cathedral, and major school events and twice-weekly services are held there. One of the boys' boarding houses, School House, is claimed to be the oldest residential building in Europe. In its entirety, the school has over 1,000 pupils. It has a small campus, with other parts in buildings near the city centre. All King's Ely sections share resources such as sports facilities and the refectory in the Monastic Barn (unless in Sixth Form where pupils eat in the Bishop's Palace).

== History ==
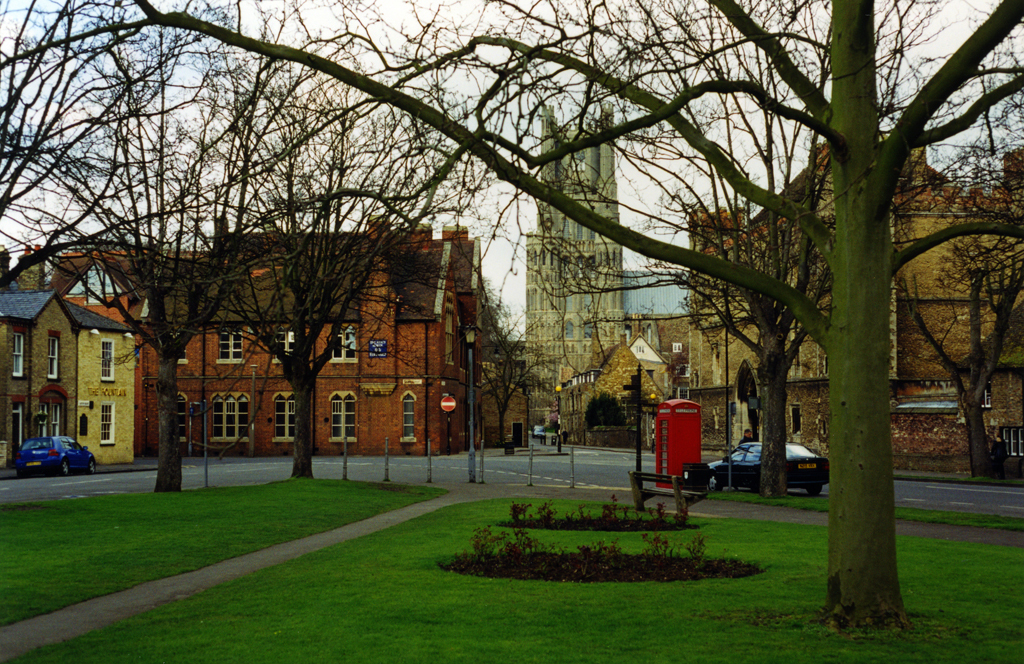
Barton Square, Ely, with school buildings surrounding it at the front and to the right. Ely Cathedral is in the distance.

=== General history ===
The school now known as King's Ely is the result of over a millennium of history which originally began with the education of child oblates on the site now occupied by Ely Cathedral in 673 AD at the abbey founded by St Etheldreda. In 840 the site was burned down by the Danes. In 970 the monastery in Ely was restored by Æthelwold, Bishop of Winchester and St Dunstan, Archbishop of Canterbury, and with it the school was re-established, and has existed continuously since then (The school therefore states its establishment as being in 970 as it has operated continuously since then). Following the Dissolution of the monasteries in 1541, many schools connected to monasteries were at risk of abolition, however the school was re-endowed and renamed to The King's School, Ely, by King Henry VIII as one of the seven King's Schools. In 1562 Queen Elizabeth I issued the school its second royal charter. The name was not retained for long however as in 1653, under Lord Protector Oliver Cromwell the school was renamed Ely Cathedral Grammar School. In 1666 the school was awarded its third royal charter by King Charles II. In 1702, upon the accession of Queen Anne the school became known as Queen Anne's School. This was due to the fact that the country now had a queen, and was an exception in this time period as no other queen has resulted in a name change. In 1720 the name The Kings School, Ely returned, until it was shortened in March 2012 to King's Ely as to distinguish the school from the six other King's Schools established or renamed by King Henry VIII in 1541.

When Hereward the Wake led the last Saxon rebellion against William the Conqueror in 1071, the monks of Ely, and therefore the teachers at the school, gave William access to a secret passageway that led to the defeat of the Rebellion and the capture of Ely.

An article in The Illustrated London News from 1882 provided the following which showed the state of the school at that time:

"The head master, after some allusion to the former history of the school (in which Edward the Confessor had been educated, and which, in the seventy years after its new foundation by Henry VIII, had developed, into a school of upwards of 300 boys, among whom were many of distinction), recounted the honours achieved in the past year. Among these were successes in the Civil Service and Indian Civil Service examination, an exhibition at Worcester College, Oxford, a first in the May examination at Queens' College, Cambridge, and a second at Peterhouse."

In his memoirs from 1955, the Reverend Christopher Campling described the school's state when he became chaplain. "Academic standards were not high, but a few boys gained admission to Oxbridge each year. The music in the school was especially good, because the choristers of the cathedral choir stayed on after their voices had broken."

The first girls were admitted in 1970 and the school has since become fully coeducational. In 2004, Susan Freestone was appointed its first female Head, taking over from Richard Youdale who had been headmaster for 12 years. In 1973, Queen Elizabeth II came to the school to celebrate the anniversary of the monastery, and also attended the school's Visitor's Feast The school keeps a strong link with the cathedral by which it is overshadowed, forming a key part of school life with pupils attending services in the Cathedral at least once per week in Acremont and the Prep School, and twice per week in the Senior School, and being the venue for Start of Term, End of Term, Admission of Scholars, and Prize Giving services, alongside purely religious services.

A Roll of Honour in School House lists 24 Old Eleans who were killed during World War I. Another Roll of Honour is located outside of the Hayward Theatre and features the names of 89 Old Eleans killed while in service of the British Armed Forces during The First World War, Second World War, and The Troubles.

=== Abolition and later reintroduction of Rugby Union ===
In June 2002, the Principal Richard Youdale aroused media interest and criticism with an announcement that the school would be phasing out rugby which had been introduced in the place of football in the early 1950s. Youdale cited, among other reasons, the increasing popularity of football. The school reinstated rugby in 2005.

=== Saturday School ===
In 2015 the school scrapped Saturday School, instead lengthening the regular working week, and leaving Saturday morning free for non-academic, non-compulsory activities.

=== List of known Headmasters and Principals ===
15th Century

- John Douham (c. 1448)

16th Century

- Ralph Holland (c1541 - 1562)
- James Speight (1562 - 1596)
- John Lucke (1596 - 1598)

17th Century

- Mark Holdred (1598 - 1604)
- William Pamplin (1605 - 1609)
- Daniel Wigmore (1609 - 1619)
- William Hitch (1619 - 1664)
- Charles Chadwick (1664 - 1674)
- Richard Peachey (1674 - 1681)
- Stephen Hutton (1681 - 1690)
- William Silvertop (1690 - 1699)

18th Century

- Edmund Tenant (1699 - 1725)
- Henry Gunning (1725 - 1763)
- William Irwin (1763 - 1776)
- Caesar Morgan (1776 - 1790)
- Richard Jeffreys (1790 - 1793)

19th Century

- Stephen Stephens (1793 - 1816)
- George Millers (1818 - 1833)
- Solomon Smith (1833 - 1834)
- Office Vacant (1834 - 1838)
- William Keatinge Clay (1838 - 1843)
- David James Stewart (1843 - 1848)
- James Henry Henderson (1848 - 1852)
- John Ingle (1852 - 1861)
- John Chambers (1862 - 1870)
- Richard Winkfield (1870 - 1894)

20th Century

- Frederick William Hawes (1894 - 1904)
- Edward Henry Blakeney (1904 - 1918)
- Thomas James Kirkland (1918 - 1941)
- Geoffrey John Cross (1941 - 1947)
- William Brown (1947 - 1955)
- Benjamin Edward Noble Fawcett (1955 - 1969)
- Hubert Ward (1970 - 1992)

21st Century

- Richard Youdale (1992 - 2004)
- Sue Freestone (2004 - 2019)
- John Attwater (2019 - )

== Notable buildings ==
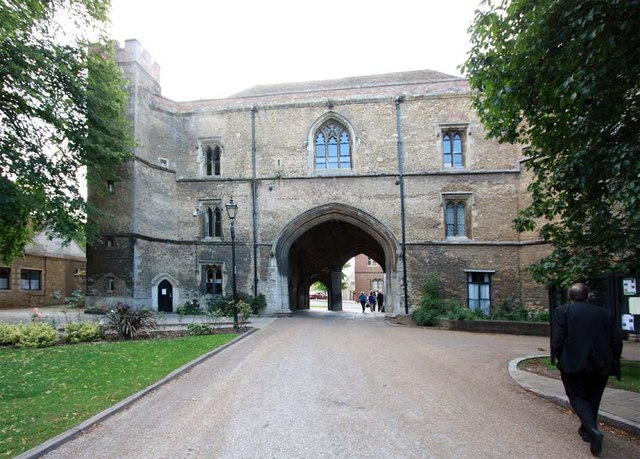
The Porta, housing the King's Ely library

=== The Porta ===
Many of Ely's monastic buildings are leased to the school by the cathedral. The imposing Porta is the gateway into the monastic buildings of the cathedral, and now houses the school's largest library, classrooms and a conference room, as well as its archive.

=== Prior Crauden's Chapel ===
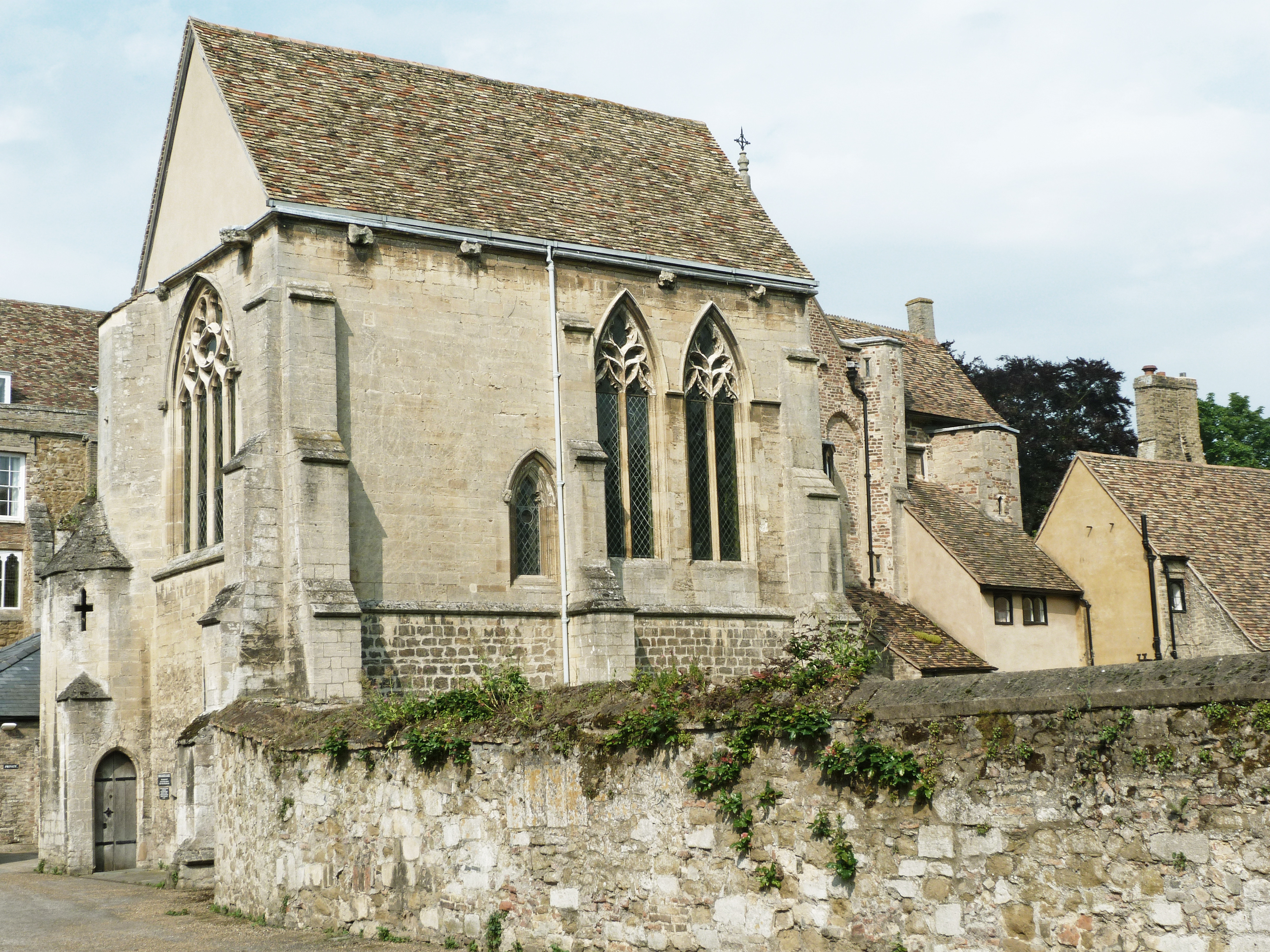
Prior Crauden's Chapel

Prior Crauden's Chapel was built in 1324 for John de Crauden. The building is Grade I listed. Small and intimate, it retains much of its original wall decoration. It is used by the school for small congregations and private prayer, its organ played by pupils and staff.

=== The Queen's Hall ===
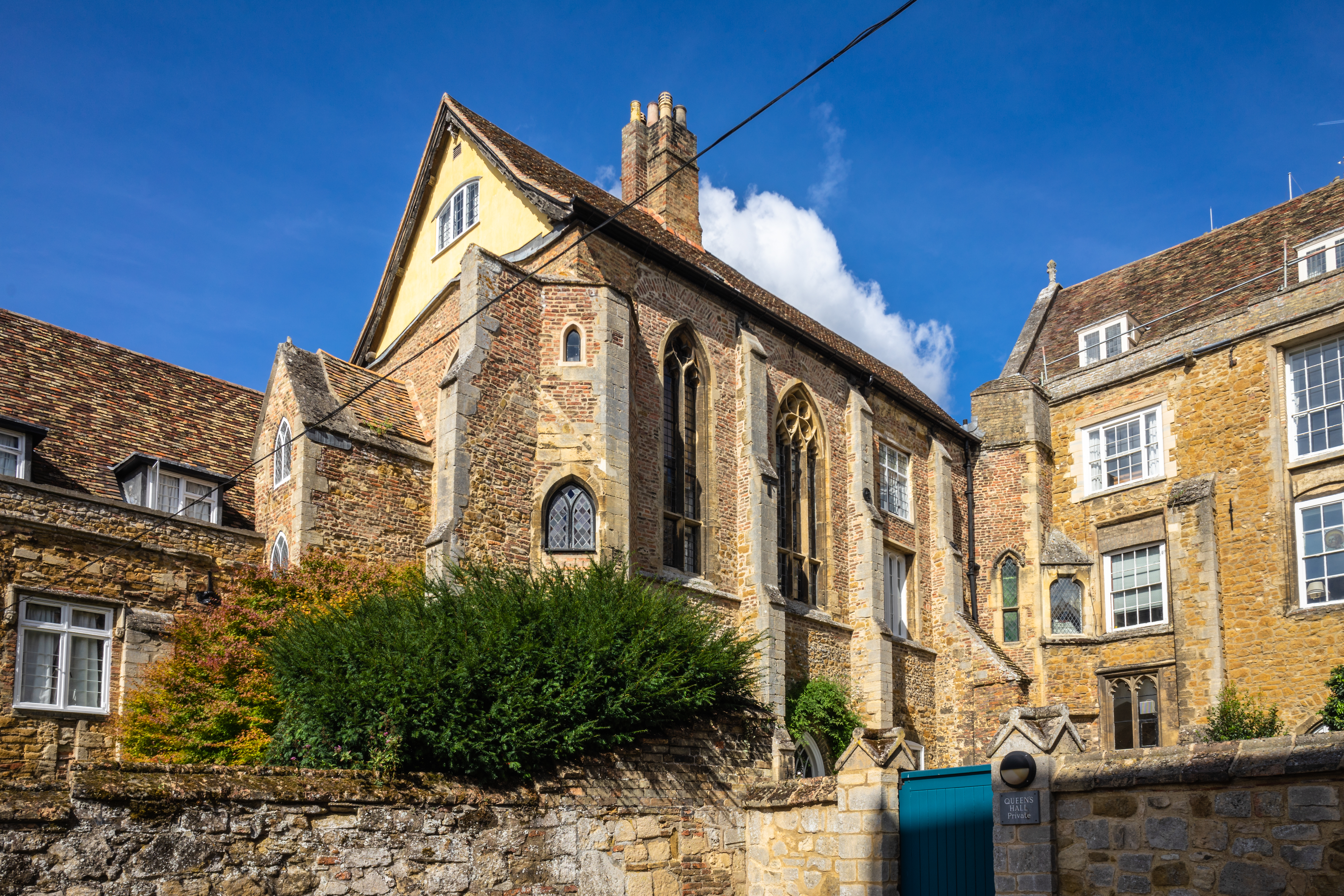
The Queen's Hall, Ely. The primary residence of the Principal. In the background you can also see School House.

Prior Crauden's Chapel is next to Queen's Hall, another 1330s building, which as the Priory housed boys aged 11–12 in the 1950s. It now serves as the residence of the Principal and his family.

=== The Infirmary ===
The Infirmary is one of the oldest surviving of the monastery's buildings, constructed in the 12th century. Located on Firmary Lane near the south transept of the cathedral, the building once housed sick monks, but is now the boarding house for the Ely Cathedral choristers.

=== Prior's House ===
Prior's House is used as a boarding house for the Prep School house, Priory House.

=== Old Hereward Hall ===
Old Hereward Hall was built in the 1800s and is now used by the school to house classrooms, alongside a portion Wilkinson House.

=== Hereward Hall ===
Hereward hall was originally the Ely Theological College, constructed in 1876 and used until 1964 when it transferred into the possession of the school.

=== Bishop's Palace ===
The palace was built in the 15th century by Bishop John Alcock and was one of the official residences of the Bishop of Ely until 1941. During the Second World War the palace was used as a base for the British Red Cross, and then as a home for disabled children until its closure in the 1980s. Following this the palace was purchased on a 99-year lease by the Sue Ryder Care organization, although the palace went up for sale again in 2010. Later that year King's Ely took over the lease and had the palace refurbished to be used as the school's Sixth Form Centre. It was opened by the Prince Richard, Duke of Gloucester on Friday 25 January 2013. In 1674 a Great London Plane Tree was planted by the Bishop of Ely at the time, Peter Gunning. In June 2002 the Tree Council designated the Great London Plane Tree of Ely as one of the 'Top 50 British Trees'.

== School traditions ==
=== King's and Queen's Scholars ===
Up to 12 of the top students in Year 12 are nominated as King's Scholars (boys) or Queen's Scholars (girls). Alongside the King's and Queen's Scholars there are also two International Scholars installed each year. They become members of the Cathedral Foundation and also qualify for other privileges such as being married in the Cathedral and being buried in its grounds. King's Scholars were inaugurated by Henry VIII in 1541 and Queen's Scholars at the request of Queen Elizabeth II in 1973 upon her visit to the school. There is no application process for these honorary scholarships, the positions instead being awarded based on pupils' GCSE results.

=== The Hoop Trundle ===
The Hoop Trundle is performed to mark the re-founding of the school by King Henry VIII, in 1541. After he dissolved the monastery, he bestowed a royal charter on the new school and introduced the first scholars. The bowling of wooden hoops within the precincts of the cathedral, along with other games, was one of the privileges that they were afforded. Female competition was added when Queen Elizabeth II introduced Queen's scholars to the school, who have taken part since. There are both male and female heats leading to a final for which a separate tankard is awarded to both sexes. The course is a 75-yard dash to a post and back along the east lawn of Ely Cathedral bowling the hoop with a wooden stick.

=== The Osmond Lecture ===
The Osmond Lecture is an annual event established in 1982 and endowed by the Old Elean's Club to commemorate Leonard Osmond, who taught Science at King's Ely from 1930 to 1972. Speakers in the last decade have included: Professor Lord Robert Winston, Patricia Fara, and Quentin Cooper.

=== Martin-Doyle Endurance Challenge ===
The annual Martin-Doyle Endurance Challenge is an endurance competition where each house nominates a team of two pupils to compete in a series of mentally and physically challenging competitions involving a 5 km run, 3 km canoe, climbing, memory challenge, tyre flip, assault course, swimming. The competition is named in memory of Kit Martin-Doyle who was one of the founders of the Ely Scheme Outdoor Education Program. In 2015 the competition, along with the wider Ely Scheme Initiative, was the subject of an article by The Telegraph as an example of the benefits of outdoor education initiatives.

== Ratings ==
The senior school was placed 12th in Cambridgeshire for its GCSE results in 2014 (based on the percentage of pupils achieving 5+ A*-C or equivalents including A*-C in both English and mathematics GCSEs); it was placed 162nd in the independent schools' table (based on the percentage of students obtaining A*/A). The school was ranked the 210th independent school for A Level results in 2014 (based on the percentage of students obtaining A*/A or equivalent qualifications); it was placed 13th of all institutions in Cambridgeshire for A Levels (based on the percentage of students achieving at least AAB with two facilitating subjects). The meaningfulness of these league tables has been very strongly questioned as some qualifications are not taken into account when they are compiled, notably International GCSEs (IGCSE) which are frequently offered by independent schools including King's Ely as they are considered good preparation for A Levels.

== The Ely Scheme ==
The Ely Scheme is the schools outdoor education initiative which has been running as an alternative to the Combined Cadet Force for over 30 years. In 2015 the Ely Scheme Initiative was the subject of an article by The Telegraph as an example of the benefits of outdoor education initiatives.

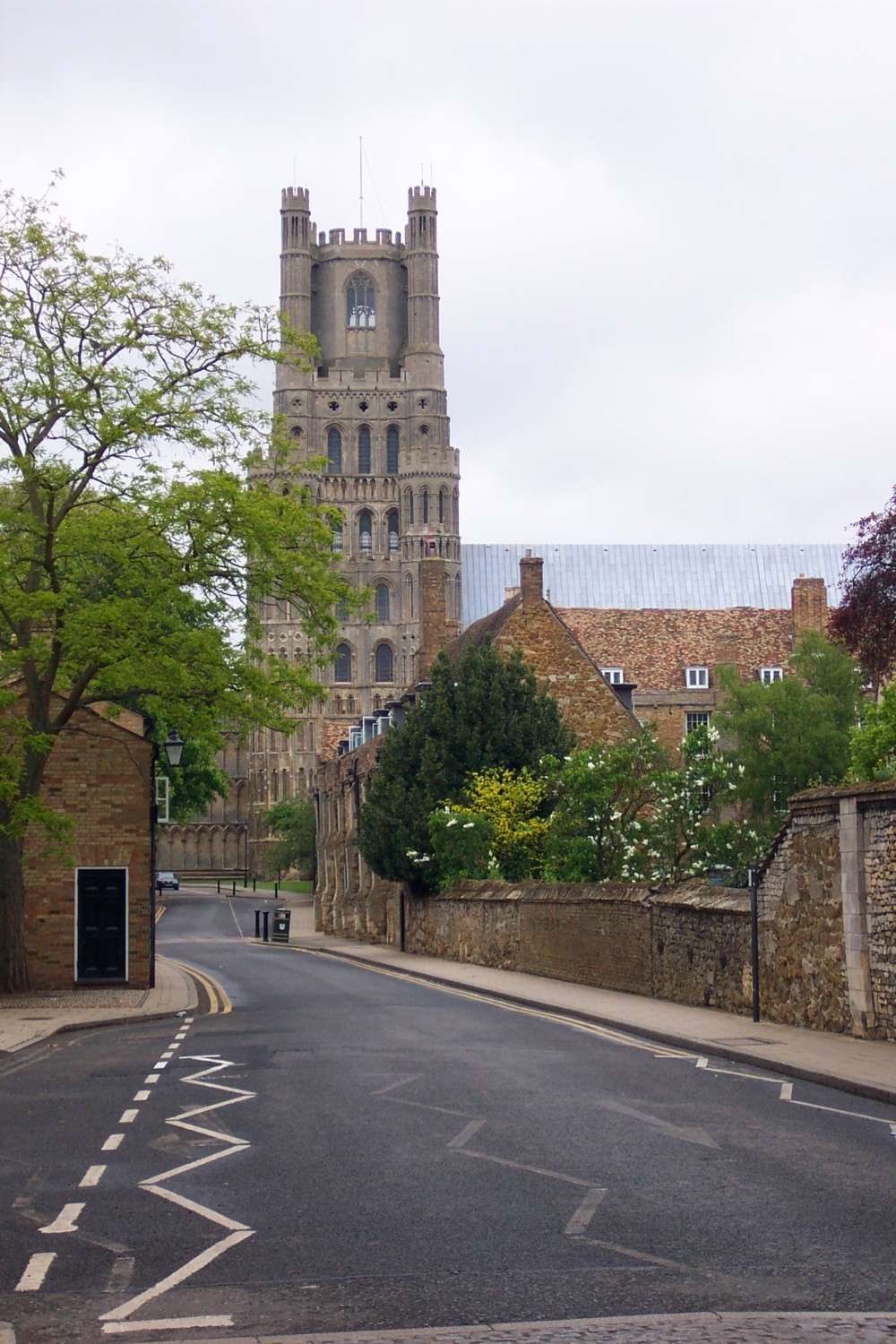
The Gallery, with Withburga house on the left, and School House garden to the right, with the Cathedral in the background

== Notable alumni ==
=== Politics ===
- Richard FitzNeal, Lord High Treasurer, 1156–1196
- Sir Antony Buck, QC, Conservative MP
- Tom Hunt, former Member of Parliament for Ipswich
- Thomas Willett, first mayor of New York.
- Syed Iftikar Bokhari, Pakistani politician and cricketer
- Desmond Crawley, British diplomat
- Sir Guy Pilling, British colonial administrator and Governor of St Helena
- Clifford Henry Fitzherbert Plowman, British Diplomat and Colonial Service administrator

=== Royalty and nobility ===
- Edward the Confessor, King of England, 1042–1066
- Sir Robert Fairbairn, 7th Baronet

=== Businessmen ===
- Lord Browne of Madingley, former CEO of BP
- Tonye Cole, Nigerian businessman
- Oswald Sanderson, English Businessman known for the Wilson Line of Hull

=== Legal Professionals ===
- Dame Joanna Smith, British High Court Judge

=== Writers ===
- Harry Sidebottom, author and historian
- Patrick Collinson, historian
- Aschlin Ditta, television and film writer
- Gytha Lodge, Sunday Times bestselling writer and multi-award-winning playwright

=== Scientists and Medical Professionals ===
- Suzy Lishman CBE, former President of the Royal College of Pathologists
- William Sole, British Apothecary and botanist
- Harry Swift, English medical practitioner and researcher
- Robert Chartham, sexologist

=== Journalists and television presenters ===
- Matthew Amroliwala, BBC News 24 newsreader
- Nigel Colborn, broadcaster and gardening expert, former presenter of BBC Gardeners' Question Time

=== Musicians ===
- James Bowman, English countertenor and former Ely Cathedral chorister
- Gus Unger-Hamilton, Keyboardist for the Indie Rock Band alt-J
- Darren Jeffery, English Bass-baritone singer

=== Actors, directors and producers ===
- Ed Blum, film director, known for the film Scenes of a Sexual Nature
- Richard Everitt, Television and film producer, with credits including Coronation Street
- Fiona Laird, Theatre director, composer, and writer.
- Hugh Miles, cinematographer and filmmaker, specialising in wildlife films
- Alan Yentob, television executive, producer and presenter of BBC's Imagine series

=== Artists and designers ===
- Aubrey Powell, designer, noted for designing Led Zeppelin's Houses of the Holy album cover
- Edward Stott, Painter
- Rupert Sanderson, British shoe designer

=== Armed forces ===
- Donald Kingaby, World War II flying ace
- Commander Alwyn Thomas Lavender Covey-Crump, author of Alphabetical Glossary of Naval Terms and Abbreviations.
- John W. R. Taylor, British Kremlinologist and military aviation expert

=== Sportspeople ===
- Oliver Jarvis, British racing driver and winner of the 2022 24 Hours of Daytona
- Benedict Jackson, English professional golfer
- Oliver Oakes, Team Principal of Alpine F1 Team, Team Principal and Director of Hitech GP, 2005 World Karting Champion, and former British Formula Three and GP3 racing driver
- Goldie Sayers, Olympic medallist – Javelin
- Nick Pope, England and Premier League goalkeeper
- William Burns, cricketer
- Henry Luddington, Cricketer

=== Others ===
- Frances Ward, Dean of St Edmundsbury, Cathedral of Bury St. Edmunds
- Harry Barton, Archdeacon of Sudbury
- James Bentham, English Clergyman and Historian of Ely Cathedral

== See also ==
- List of the oldest schools in the United Kingdom
- List of the oldest schools in the world
- The King's School, Canterbury
- The King's School, Chester
- The King's School, Gloucester
- The King's School, Peterborough
- The King's School, Rochester
- The King's School, Worcester
