= Everingham (disambiguation) =

Everingham is a village in the East Riding of Yorkshire, England.

Everingham may also refer to:

- Baron Everingham, 14th Century English Barony
- Everingham (surname)
- HMS Everingham (M2626)
