= St Everilda's Church =

St Everilda's Church is the name of:

- St Everilda's Church, Everingham, in the East Riding of Yorkshire, England
- St Everilda's Church, Nether Poppleton, in North Yorkshire, England

== See also ==
- Ss Mary & Everilda, Everingham, in the East Riding of Yorkshire, England
