= Nether Poppleton =

Village and civil parish in North Yorkshire, England

- Location within North Yorkshire
- Population: 2,141 (2011 census)
- OS grid reference: SE564550
- Civil parish: Nether Poppleton
- Unitary authority: City of York
- Ceremonial county: North Yorkshire
- Region: Yorkshire and the Humber
- Country: England
- Sovereign state: United Kingdom
- Post town: YORK
- Postcode district: YO26
- Dialling code: 01904
- Police: North Yorkshire
- Fire: North Yorkshire
- Ambulance: Yorkshire
- UK Parliament: York Outer

Nether Poppleton is a village and civil parish in the unitary authority of the City of York in North Yorkshire, England. It is by the west bank of the River Ouse and is adjacent to Upper Poppleton west of York. It is close to the A59 road from York to Harrogate. The village is served by Poppleton railway station on the Harrogate Line.

According to the 2001 census, the parish had a population of 2,077. That increased to 2,141 at the 2011 census. Before 1996, it had been part of the Borough of Harrogate.

The name is derived from popel (pebble) and tun (hamlet, farm) and means "pebble farm" because of the gravel bed upon which the village was built. The neighbouring village of Upper Poppleton has been referred to as "Land Poppleton" and Nether Poppleton as "Water Poppleton", indicating the villages' position relative to the river.

The village is mentioned in the Domesday Book of 1086 and an Anglo-Saxon charter of circa 972. It became a Conservation Area in 1993. The earthworks to the north and east of the parish church are designated as a Scheduled Monument (53°59′23.12″N 1°8′25.95″W).

== History ==
In 972, the village was recorded as "Popeltun" in a list made for Archbishop of York Oswald of Church property lost in the wars earlier in the century, and in the Domesday Book as "Popletune". The villages and lands were given by Osbern De Arches to the Abbot of St Mary's in York. It was, therefore, under the ecclesiastical rule of the Parish of St Mary-Bishophill Junior.

During the reign of Richard II, the village was the scene of the murder of a mayor of York.

In 1644, the 25,000-strong Scottish and Parliament armies, led by the Earl of Manchester, laid siege to the city of York. To facilitate communications, they built a "bridge of boats" at Poppleton. This bridge was eventually taken by Prince Rupert and his Royalist forces, but he subsequently lost the battle at Marston Moor.

The village benefited from the growth in the railways in the 19th century when the York, Knaresborough and Harrogate Railway routed its line through Poppleton and built a station.

On 22 January 1876, the village was the birthplace of Flora Sandes, the only woman to be officially enlisted during the First World War.

The village was historically part of the West Riding of Yorkshire until 1974. It was then a part of the Borough of Harrogate in North Yorkshire from 1974 until 1996. Since 1996 it has been part of the City of York unitary authority.

=== Time Team Dig 2004 ===
In June 2004, the British broadcaster Channel 4, in association with Yorkshire Wessex Archaeology, made an episode of its archaeological programme Time Team in the village to investigate the origins of the village. The dig was based near some of the earthenworks around the village, especially near the church and Manor Farm.

In total, 12 trenches were dug, along with 32 test pits dug by the local population on the first day of the three-day dig. The dig found evidence that there had been a monastic building in the village that was dated AD 450–850 and a formerly-unknown Tudor manor.

== Governance ==
Nether Poppleton lies within the Rural West Ward of the City of York Unitary Authority. As of the 2023 elections, it is represented by councillors Anne Hook and Emilie Knight, who are both members of the Liberal Democrats. It is a part of the UK Parliamentary Constituency of York Outer.

Locally, there is a parish council with seven council members.

== Economy ==
Poppleton was formerly an agricultural settlement with many farms, but the modern village is mostly a dormitory for commuters to the nearby towns and cities. It has benefited from its good road and rail links. The village shares local retail facilities, including a post office, and some small enterprises with Upper Poppleton.

== Demography ==
In the 19th century, the population varied between 254 and 346. The 2001 census recorded the population as 1,961.

== Education ==
As of 2010, Poppleton Ousebank Primary School provides primary education for both Poppletons.

For secondary education, the village is in the catchment area of York High School on Cornlands Road in nearby Acomb. The nearest secondary school is Manor Church of England Academy on Millfield Lane, which has its own admissions policy separate from the local city council's policy. It was originally built in 1813 at Kings Manor and has moved several times before being sited in Millfield Lane.

== Transport ==
East Yorkshire buses run past the south of the village (along the A59) as part of the York to Ripon route. First York run service through the village from Upper Poppleton.

Poppleton railway station is located on the Harrogate line, which runs from York to Leeds via Harrogate. Northern Rail operates services from Poppleton in each direction.

== Religion ==
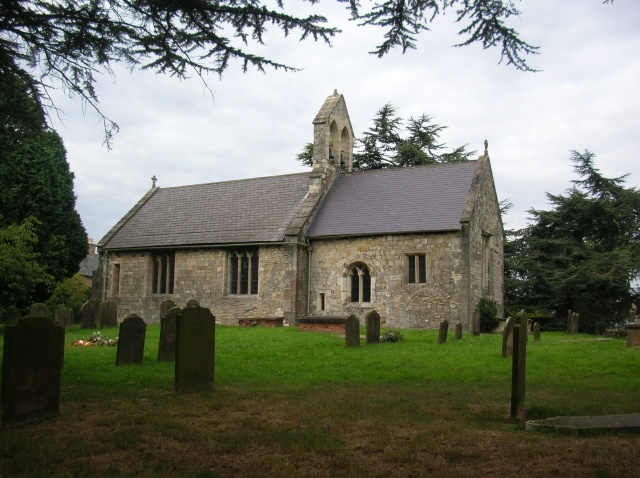
St. Everilda's Church, Nether Poppleton

St Everilda's Church is at the end of Church Lane and is thought to have origins as early as the seventh century. The stained glass in the eastern window and in one of the windows in the south aisle are of late 13th century and early 14th century. St Everilda's Church is named after a seventh century Saxon saint. It is one of only two churches in the United Kingdom dedicated to this saint. The other is at Everingham some 20 miles (32 km) to the south-east in the East Riding of Yorkshire.

== Sports ==
The local football team, Poppleton United, and a lawn tennis club are in nearby Upper Poppleton. A Junior Football club, Poppleton Tigers, is based on Millfield Lane. The team play at the Poppleton Community Sports Pavilion, which was opened by John Sentamu, Archbishop of York on 10 October 2011.

== See also ==
- Nether Poppleton Tithebarn
