= Nether Poppleton Tithe Barn =

Grade II listed building in York, England

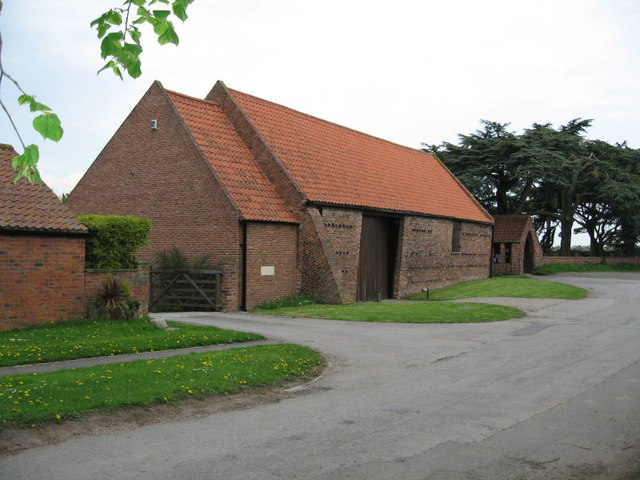
- Interactive map of the Nether Poppleton Tithe Barn area

General information
- Type: Tithe barn
- Location: Manor Farm, Nether Poppleton, York, England
- Coordinates: 53°59′16″N 1°08′26″W (grid reference SE5655)
- Current tenants: Friends of the Poppleton Tithe Barn
- Completed: c. 1542
- Renovated: 1999–2000

Design and construction
- Designations: Grade II listed

Website
- www.poppleton.net/tithebarn

The Nether Poppleton Tithe Barn is a tithe barn at Manor Farm in the village of Nether Poppleton in the unitary authority of City of York in the North of England. Research by dendrochronologists has shown that the tithe barn, which was built on the site of an old nunnery, is at least 450 years old.

The area surrounding the barn forms part of a scheduled monument and after nearby St Everilda's Church, the tithe barn is the oldest, largest and most important building in both Poppletons.

== History ==
An old nunnery once occupied the site of the Nether Poppleton Tithe Barn until the dissolution of the monasteries. The Nether Poppleton Tithe Barn was then constructed on the site around 1542.

The building is often referred to as "Rupert's Barn" because Prince Rupert of the Rhine is said to have stationed part of his army in the barn before the Battle of Marston Moor in 1644 during the English Civil War. There is also an historical connection with the Restoration of King Charles II because in 1660, Lord Fairfax and two hundred Yorkshire gentlemen gathered at the barn before marching into York for the proclamation of the restored King.

The current brickwork was added during the 18th century, and it was used to store hay and potatoes during the 20th century. The Barn was damaged in a fire in 1928 which saw the destruction of two gables at one end and the removal of the wagon entrance.

It became a Grade II listed building on 27 August 1987 and The Friends of the Poppleton Tithe Barn (registered charity number 1060767) was then founded in 1997 to preserve and maintain the Tithe Barn for the benefit of the local community and future generations. It was restored in 1999 and completed in the year 2000. The then Duke of York (later Andrew Mountbatten-Windsor) visited the Barn in 1999 whilst it was being restored.
