= Listed buildings in Everingham =

Everingham is a civil parish in the county of the East Riding of Yorkshire, England. It contains nine listed buildings that are recorded in the National Heritage List for England. Of these, two are listed at Grade I, the highest of the three grades, one is at Grade II*, the middle grade, and the others are at Grade II, the lowest grade. The parish contains the villages of Everingham and Harswell and the surrounding countryside, and the listed buildings consist of houses, two churches and a chapel.

== Key ==
Grade	Criteria
I	Buildings of exceptional interest, sometimes considered to be internationally important
II*	Particularly important buildings of more than special interest
II	Buildings of national importance and special interest

== Buildings ==
Name and location	Photograph	Date	Notes	Grade
St Everilda's Church; 53.87085°N 0.77867°W		Early 13th century	The earliest part of the church is the tower, and the rest was rebuilt in about 1763. The tower is in stone, the body of the church is in red brick, and the roof is in slate. The church consists of a nave with a canted apse, and a west tower with a porch. The tower has three stages, a small rectangular window, a chamfered band, and round-headed bell openings. Above them is a band and an embattled parapet with crocketed corner pinnacles. The west doorway has a round-arched head, and on the south wall is a datestone. Along the sides of the church are three round-arched recesses containing lancet windows, and at the east end is a Venetian window.	II*
Everingham Hall; 53.86911°N 0.77552°W		1757–64	The house was designed by John Carr, and restored in 1962–63. The entrance front has three storeys and seven bays, the middle three bays projecting under a pediment. The front has a plinth, rusticated quoins, a floor band and sill bands, modillion eaves and raking cornices, and a hipped roof. On the front is a Doric porch with an entablature and a pediment, and a doorway with a fanlight. The windows are sashes, those on the ground floor with Gibbs surrounds, and above with architraves.	I
Field House; 53.87586°N 0.74996°W		Late 18th century	The house is in brown brick, and has a pantile roof with tumbled-in brick to the raised gables. There are two storeys and three bays. The central doorway has a fanlight, and the windows are sashes under segmental arches painted in imitation of wedge lintels.	II
Former Rectory, Everingham; 53.87076°N 0.77975°W	—	1812	The house is in grey brick, with stone dressings, a floor band, and a hipped slate roof. There are two storeys and three bays. The central doorway has attached Roman Doric columns, a fanlight with radial glazing, fluted impost blocks, and an open dentilled pediment. This is flanked by canted bay windows, and the upper floor contains sash windows under flat gauged brick arches.	II
Chapel east of St Everilda's Church; 53.87042°N 0.77801°W	—	Early 19th century	The chapel is in stuccoed red brick, with a slate roof, one storey and one bay. The doorway is in an architrave with a decorated cornice on consoles. It is flanked by round-arched niches, and all are under a low pediment.	II
North Lodge; 53.87009°N 0.77874°W	—	1827	The lodge at the entrance to the grounds of Everingham Hall is in rendered and colourwashed brick, with stone dressings, oversailing eaves with decorative bargeboards, and an ornamental slate roof. There are two storeys and three bays. The middle bay projects under a gable, and has an open trellised porch, and a doorway with a chamfered stone architrave. The windows are casements in architraves with hood moulds.	II
The Beeches; 53.86452°N 0.77806°W	—	c. 1830	The house is in light brown brick with a hipped slate roof. There are two storeys and three bays. The central doorway has fluted pilasters, a fanlight with radial glazing, and a cornice on fluted brackets. The windows are sashes with wedge lintels.	II
Ss Mary & Everilda, Everingham; 53.86941°N 0.77605°W		1836–39	The church is in stuccoed red brick, and has lead roofs. It consists of a narthex, a nave with east transepts, and an apsidal sanctuary. The entrance front has a giant round-arched recess with a coffered soffit, and contains a door with a fanlight in an eared architrave. Above is an inscribed frieze and a pediment with a moulded cornice. This is flanked by two-stage bays, the lower stage rusticated, above is a band with putti, a window flanked by angels, and a shallow cornice. The interior is described as being "spectacular".	I
Former Rectory, Harswell; 53.85884°N 0.74632°W		1856	The house is in brown brick, with stone dressings, a stepped floor band, and a hipped slate roof. There are two storeys and three bays, and a lower two-storey bay on the left. In the centre bay is a giant round arch with a keystone containing a Tuscan porch with an entablature and a blank pediment, This is flanked by sidelights, and above is a round-arched stair window. The outer bays contain sash windows under cambered brick arches.	II
