= Ely and Littleport riots of 1816 =

Civil unrest in Cambridgeshire, England

Ely and Littleport riots
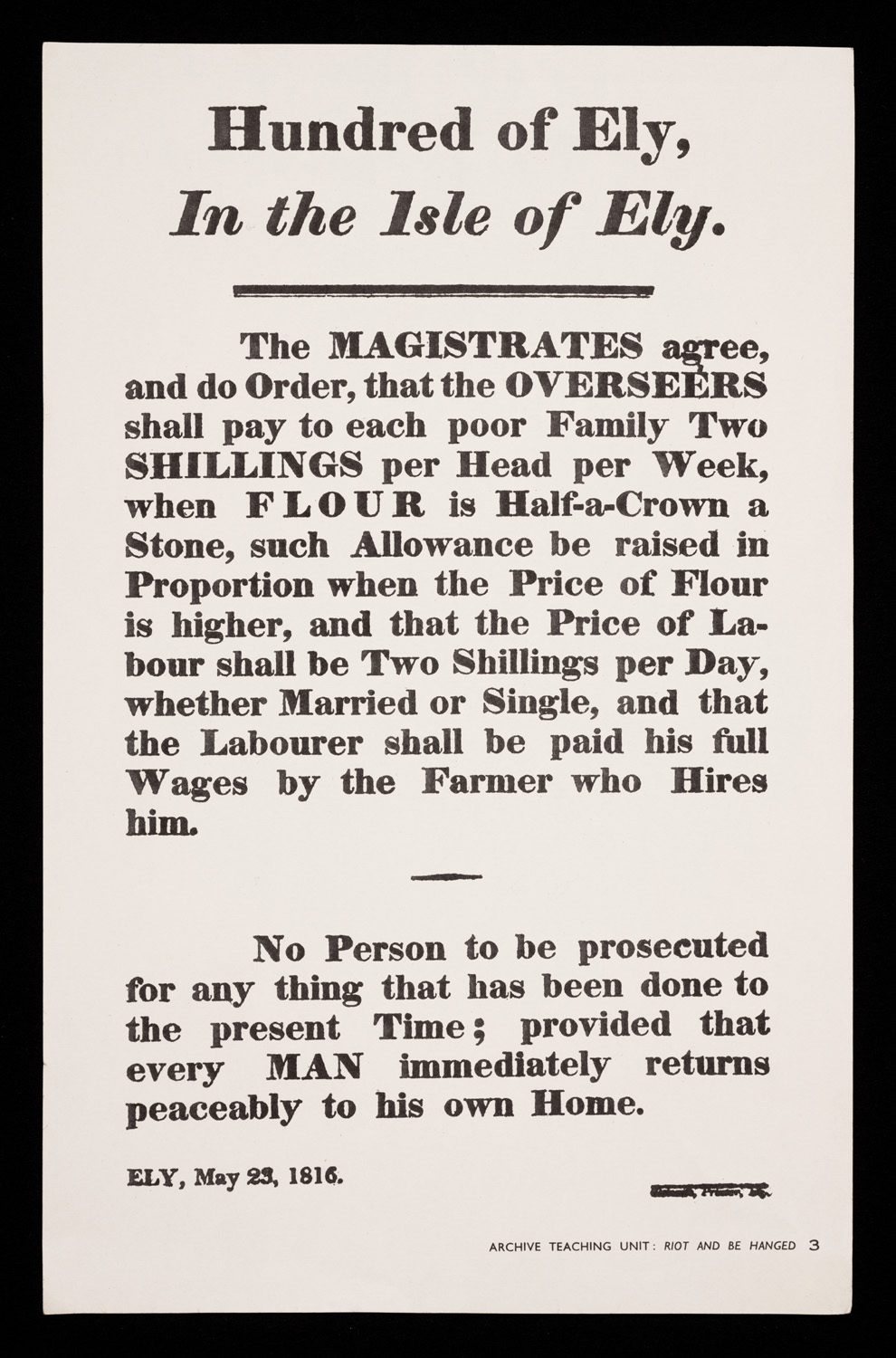
- Facsimile of a printed handbill, 23 May 1816, prepared by magistrates Henry Law, William Metcalfe and Peploe Ward
- Date: 22 May 1816 – 24 May 1816
- Location: Littleport and Ely in Isle of Ely, Cambridgeshire, England
- Also known as: Littleport riots
- Participants: Initially 56 citizens of Littleport, then spread to Ely; 82 people were arrested
- Outcome: One rioter killed by troops; 23 men and one woman condemned; five men hanged on 28 June 1816; sentences on the other 19 varied from 12 months in prison to transportation for life

The Ely and Littleport riots occurred between 22 and 24 May 1816 in the Isle of Ely, Cambridgeshire, caused by high unemployment and rising grain costs, similar to the general unrest which spread throughout England following the Napoleonic Wars.

The Littleport riot broke out when a group of residents met at The Globe Inn. Fuelled by alcohol, they left the inn and began intimidating wealthier Littleport residents, demanding money and destroying property. The riot spread to Ely where magistrates attempted to calm the protests by ordering poor relief and fixing a minimum wage. The following day, encouraged by Lord Liverpool's government, a militia of the citizens of Ely, led by Sir Henry Bate Dudley and backed by the 1st The Royal Dragoons, rounded up the rioters. In the ensuing altercation at The George and Dragon in Littleport, a trooper was injured, one rioter was killed, and at least one went on the run.

Edward Christian, brother of Fletcher Christian, had been appointed Chief Justice of the Isle of Ely in 1800 by the Bishop of Ely. As the Chief Justice, Christian was entitled to try the rioters alone. The government, in this case via the Home Secretary, Lord Sidmouth, nevertheless appointed a Special Commission, consisting of Justice Abbott and Justice Burrough. The rioters were tried in the assizes at Ely during the week commencing 17 June 1816. 23 men and one woman were condemned, of which five were subsequently hanged. General unrest and riots such as that at Littleport may have been a factor in the government passing the Vagrancy Act 1824 and subsequently the Metropolitan Police Act 1829.

== Background ==
In 1815, the government increased taxation (Note: Corn Laws: Importation Act 1815 (55 Geo. 3. c. 26)) on imported wheat and grain to help pay for the costs of the Napoleonic Wars (1803–1815). Poor laws, such as the Speenhamland system, were designed to help alleviate financial distress of the poorer communities, but such systems helped to keep wages artificially low as the farmers knew labourers' wages would be supplemented by the system. Basic commodities, like cereals and bread, became heavily over-priced, creating widespread social unrest. The worst hit were the families of the men returning from the Battle of Waterloo (1815) who arrived home at a time when unemployment was already high. One reply to a questionnaire circulated by the Board of Agriculture in February, March, and April 1816 reported that "the state of the labouring poor is very deplorable, and arises entirely from the want of employment, which they are willing to seek, but the farmer cannot afford to furnish."

In early 1816, a quarter (28 pounds) of wheat cost 52 shillings (£219), (Note: All monetary figures in this article are inflated to 2025 values using RPI as described in Choosing the Best Indicator to Measure Relative Worth) rising through 76 shillings (£320) in May to 103 shillings (£434) in December. Average wages for the period remained static at 8–9 shillings (£34–£38), per week. In 1815, a pound of bread was quoted at over 4 shillings (£17) and predicted to rise to over 5 shillings (£21). (Note: One bushell is 56 pounds (25 kg) making 90 one-pound (0.45 kg) loaves of whole wheat bread. One quarter is 28 pounds (13 kg) making 45 loaves of whole wheat bread) (Note: Earl Grey, He said "At the present price of 60s. the quartern loaf was 1s. and therefore at 80s. one third more, the price of the quartern loaf must be 1s. 4d." (13 March 1815). "State of the Corn Laws". Parliamentary Debates (Hansard). House of Commons. col. 137. (Note: "Quartern loaf n. 1. b: A quarter of a pound (in later use Eng. regional)"—"quartern". Oxford English Dictionary (online ed.). Oxford University Press. (Subscription or participating institution membership required.)))

== Rioting ==
=== Preceding events in the region ===
There was rioting in the first months of 1816 in West Suffolk, Norfolk and Cambridgeshire. On 16 May riots broke out in Bury St Edmunds (known locally as Bury) and Brandon in West Suffolk and also in Hockwold, Feltwell and Norwich in Norfolk.

On the morning of 20 May, a meeting was held in Southery, Norfolk. The group, including a Thomas Sindall, marched through Denver to Downham Market to meet with the magistrates at their weekly meeting at The Crown public house. Sindall was the only person known to have been at both the riots at Downham Market and Littleport. He was killed by troopers at Littleport—see below. The mob of 1,500, mainly men but some women, besieged The Crown until the magistrates agreed to allow a deputation of eight rioters inside to make their pleas: to have work and two-shillings (£8) per day. The magistrates acceded to these demands, but they had already called the yeomanry cavalry from Upwell, who arrived at 5 pm. Backed by the troops, the Riot Act was then read in the market place by Reverend Dering, (Note: Possibly Rector of West Deeping, now in Lincolnshire) causing further tussles, which subsided after arrests started to be made.

At the Norfolk and Norwich Assizes in August, nine men and six women were sentenced to death. Thirteen of those sentences were commuted, and two of the Downham rioters, Daniel Harwood and Thomas Thody, were hanged on the afternoon of 31 August 1816.

=== Littleport ===
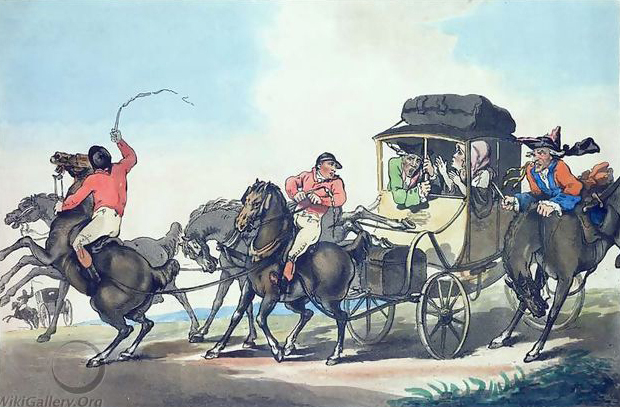
A post-chaise, perhaps similar to this one, carrying Hugh Robert Evans was stopped and robbed by William Beamiss the younger on 22 May 1816. Beamiss was subsequently indicted for highway robbery. Painting by Thomas Rowlandson, 1785.

Littleport is a large village in Cambridgeshire with a population in 1811 of 1,847. It is just under 11 miles (18 km) south-south-west of Downham Market and just over 4 miles (6 km) north-north-east of Ely.

On 22 May 1816, a group of 56 residents met at The Globe Inn in Littleport to discuss the lack of work and rising grain costs. Fuelled by alcohol, the residents directed their anger at local farmer Henry Martin. He had been overseer of the poor in 1814 and was not well liked by the parishioners. One man went to get a horn from Burgess, the lighterman, (Note: The lighterman took people from Littleport to Downham Market on pleasure cruises in his lighter) and started blowing it outside The Globe Inn, gathering hundreds of villagers to join the first group, and the riot commenced.

The rioters began at Mingey's shop, where stones were thrown through the windows, and then they invaded Mr Clarke's property and threw his belongings into the street. Next, at Josiah Dewey's place, the Reverend John Vachell and his wife arrived to try to calm the rioters. Vachell had been vicar of St George's since 1795 and was also a magistrate; he was an unpopular man, as he dealt harshly with even minor offences. He read or tried to read the Riot Act without effect, as the crowd "told him to go home."

The rioters next visited the premises of disabled 90-year-old Mr Sindall, throwing his furniture into the street; his housekeeper, Mrs Hutt, was intimidated by a rioter wielding a butcher's cleaver. After stopping at the place of Mr Little, "a nice old gentleman," who gave the mob £2 (£169), they continued to Robert Speechly's and demolished his furniture. Next they broke into the house of Rebecca Waddelow looking for Harry Martin, her grandson. He had seen them coming and escaped out the back. Rebecca Cutlack was visiting at the time, and they robbed her and removed property worth between £100 and £200 (£8,428–£16,857).

At about 11 pm, the rioters arrived at the house of the Reverend Vachell, who, after threatening to shoot anyone who entered his house, was disarmed when three men rushed him. He fled on foot with his wife and two daughters towards Ely. After Vachell had left, the rioters destroyed his goods and chattels and stole some of his silverware. Vachell was later to sue the Hundred of Ely for the damages under the Riot Act. He received over £708 (£59,672), an award which was challenged in the press, as many people complained about the size of the resulting district levies used to pay for it. The rioters then stopped a post-chaise returning with Hugh Robert Evans senior and Henry Martin from a turnpike trust meeting in Downham. They robbed Evans of 14 shillings (£59) before allowing them both to proceed. On reaching Ely, Evans alerted the magistrates who sent a carriage for Reverend Vachell, which collected him and his family walking towards Ely.

=== Ely ===
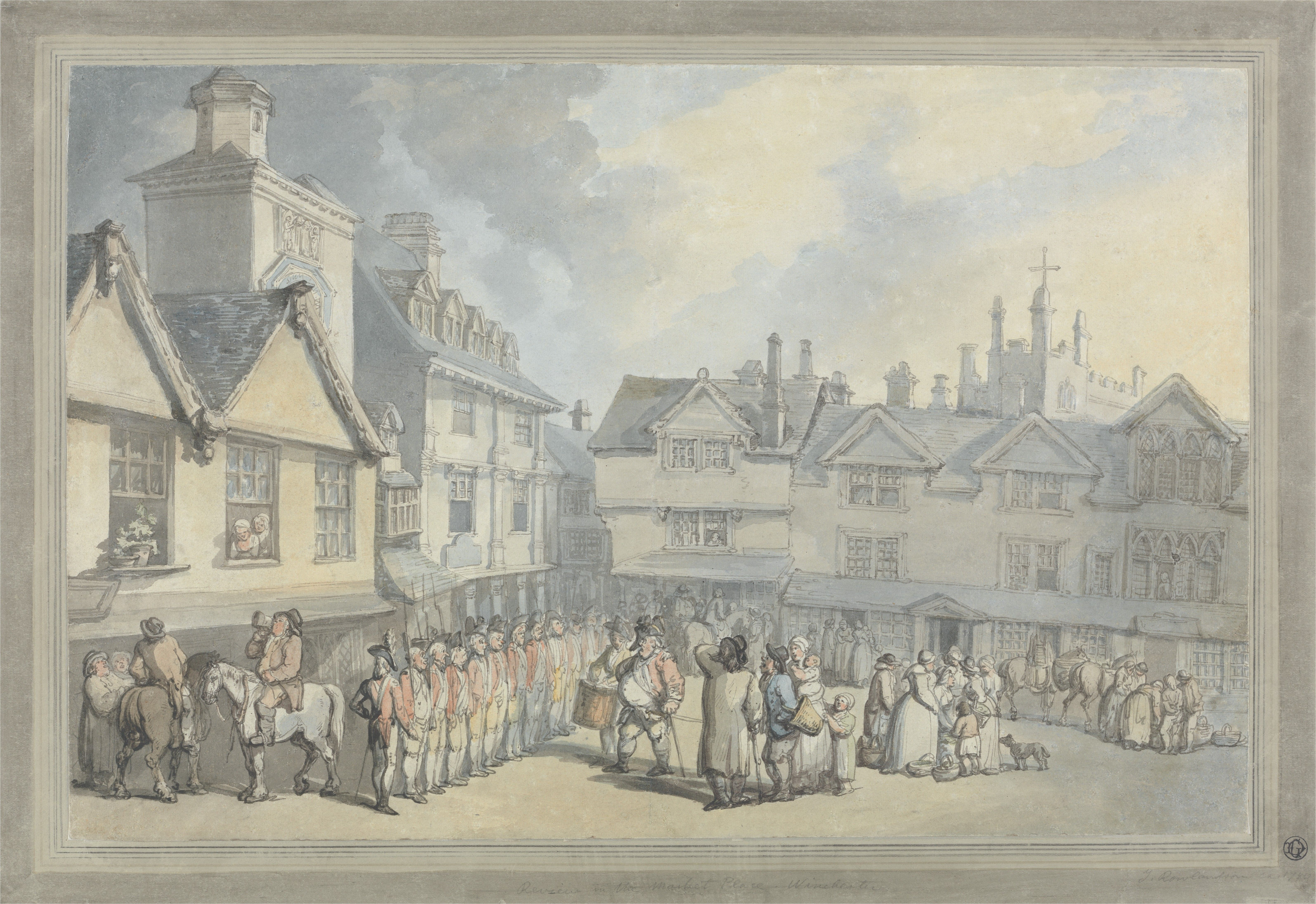
A market-place, similar to Ely in 1816, where the 1st The Royal Dragoons paraded on 24 May 1816. Painting by Thomas Rowlandson, 1790.

Ely was a city (Note: Ely has long been thought of as a city. See for example 1800 John Aikin "England Delineated". It was not until 1 April 1974 that it was granted city status by Letters patent) with an 1811 population of 4,249 people. The city is nearly 15 miles (24 km) north-north-east of Cambridge and 67 miles (108 km) (Note: 67 miles (108 km) according to John Cary's coach routes but nearly 65 miles (105 km) by 21st century routes) north-north-east of London. When Vachell arrived in Ely, he alerted fellow clergymen and magistrates Reverend William Metcalfe and Reverend Henry Law who dispatched Thomas Archer, as a messenger, to Bury, 26 miles (42 km) to the east.

The rioters in Littleport had in the interim stolen a wagon and horses from Henry Tansley and equipped it with fowling guns (Note: a large twin-bore shotgun used to kill wild-fowl "about 7–10 feet (2–3 m) in length, carry about 2 pounds (1 kg) of shot, and will kill at a distance of 150 yards (140 m)") front and back. A man named John Dennis emerged as in command of the makeshift army. Most of the Littleport mob, armed with guns and pitch-forks, then began the march to Ely, arriving three-quarters of a mile (1.2 km) north of the city between 5 am and 6 am on 23 May. The Reverend Metcalfe met them, read the Riot Act, and asked what the mob required. On being told that they wanted "the price of a stone of flour per day" and that "our children are starving, give us a living wage," the Reverend agreed but stated that he would have to converse with the other magistrates. He asked everyone to return to Littleport, but they marched on. Metcalfe implored them to go to the market place and many did go there, where they were joined by Ely citizens.

The magistrates negotiated with a committee of the rioters in the White Hart public house. Recognising the needs of the rioters, the Ely magistrates, the Reverends Metcalfe, Peploe Ward and Law drafted a response, offering poor families two-shillings per head per week and ordering farmers to pay two-shillings (£8) per day wages. On hearing the proclamation, the mob cheered. The magistrates then "gave the men some beer, told them not to get drunk and tried to persuade them to go home". Some took the advice, whilst others continued the rampage, intimidating shopkeepers, millers and bankers and stealing from some. However, most of the rioters, marching with their wagons and guns, left the city for Littleport before the arrival of the military from Bury.

Meanwhile, the magistrates delegated Henry Law to go to London to discuss the matter with Lord Sidmouth (Henry Addington), the Home Secretary. On the way, Law stopped at the barracks of the Royston troop of volunteer yeomanry cavalry and requested they go to Ely. Law was unable to convince Sidmouth of the seriousness of the situation, and Sidmouth asked Reverend Sir Henry Bate Dudley to return with Law and report on the matter.

== Restoring order ==
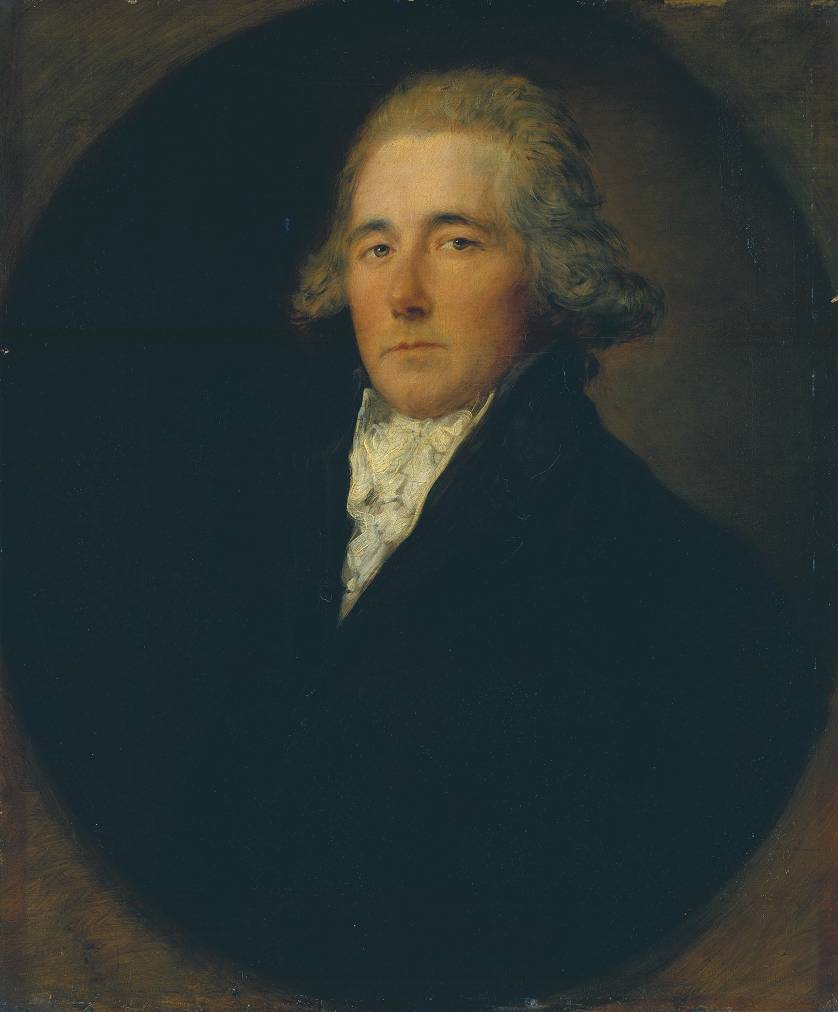
Sir Henry Dudley, 1st Baronet, "the fighting parson", led the troops rounding up the rioters in Littleport on 24 May 1816. Painting c. 1780 by Thomas Gainsborough.

A detachment of 18 men of the 1st The Royal Dragoons, commanded by Captain Methuen, arrived in Ely from Bury on 23 May in the late afternoon. They marched through the streets as a show of force, remaining all night. The following afternoon, 24 May, the troops marched on Littleport, led by Sir Henry Bate Dudley and John Bacon, a Bow Street constable. They were followed by the Royston troop of volunteer yeomanry cavalry summoned earlier by Henry Law, and a militia of gentlemen and inhabitants of Ely.

Before arrival at the Ely Road, a small detachment of troops were ordered across the Hemp Field to enter the village from the east. (Note: 52.4524°N 0.3008°E) The larger group then charged at a hard gallop down the Mill Street incline through to Main Street. (Note: Now Mill Pit Furlong from:52.4524°N 0.3013°E to:52.4560°N 0.3045°E) The rioters were found making a stand in The George and Dragon near the west end of Station Road. The militia were called to the front when the rioters would not come out after being ordered to by Bate Dudley. Thomas South, shooting from a window, hit trooper Wallace in the forearm. The militia got the rioters out of the public house and assembled them in the street, surrounded by the troopers. Thomas Sindall (it is unclear what relation, if any, he was to the elderly Mr Sindall mentioned above) attempted to take a musket from trooper William Porter but was not successful. Sindall ran away and when he did not stop after being called on to do so by Porter, he was shot through the back of the head. Thomas Sindall was killed; he was the only person known to be at both Downham Market and Littleport. The result of this shooting was to subdue the rest of the rioters. Those captured were taken to Ely gaol and the rest of the rioters were rounded up.

The home secretary, Lord Sidmouth, had dispatched three troops of cavalry (100 men), two six–pounder cannons and three companies of the 69th (South Lincolnshire) Regiment of Foot under Major General Byng to help capture the leading rioters.

Two rioters were hidden in Lakenheath by a labourer who eventually betrayed them for £5 each (£421). One rioter, William Gotobed, a bricklayer, escaped and was eventually pardoned a few years later. He returned to Littleport after seven years and then went to America. The rioting spread to nearby areas such as Little Downham, although such areas were not as badly affected. It took until 10 June before the areas were finally cleared of trouble and all of the rioters had been captured.

== Trial ==
The assizes for the 82 persons, 73 of whom were in prison and nine on bail, lasted from Monday 17 June 1816 through to the following Saturday.

=== Special Commission ===
From AD 970 until 1837 (Note: Liberty of Ely Act 1837 (7 Will. 4 & 1 Vict. c. 53)) the Bishop of Ely retained exclusive jurisdiction in civil and criminal matters, and was also keeper of the records (custos rotulorum). As part of this right, the bishop appointed a Chief Justice of the Isle of Ely; Edward Christian had held the post since 1800. In these special assizes, the Crown, via Lord Sidmouth, created a Special Commission. Sidmouth appointed two judges, Mr Justice Abbott and Mr Justice Burrough to preside over it. Christian, nevertheless, felt he should attend and indeed was in attendance throughout. After the trial Christian said, "It was suggested to me in London, ... that it would be more conducive to the great object of the Commission, ... if I declined my rotation of duty, and left the trial of all the prisoners to them [the appointed commissioners]."

=== Monday ===
Shortly after 10 am, the three judges went to the courthouse, in the market place at that time, and the Special Commission was read. The judges then breakfasted at the bishop's palace, after which a service was held in the cathedral and attended by 50 of the principal inhabitants of Ely. The text of the sermon, preached by Henry Bate Dudley, was "that the law is not made for a righteous man, but for the lawless and disobedient". (Note: I Timothy i. 9)

After the service, around 1 pm, the court reconvened; the grand jury was sworn in, and Mr W. Dunn Gardner elected the foreman. Mr Gurney, Mr Bolland and Mr Richardson, were counsel for the Crown, led by Mr William Hobhouse, Treasury solicitor. For the defence, Mr Hunt was counsel for Jefferson, Wyebrow, Harley, Pricke, Cooper, Freeman and Jessop; Mr Hart was counsel for John Easey, Joseph Easey, Benton, Layton, Atkin, Hobbs and another.

Mr Justice Abbott addressed the court:

Gentlemen of the Grand Jury,—You have been called together at this unusual period, and with the present solemnities, in consequence of some very daring acts of outrage committed by various misguided individuals in this town and its immediate neighbourhood, which must still be fresh in your recollection. In contemplating the nature of these atrocities, it is impossible to consider without commendation, the conductors of those prompt and efficacious measures by which, after it had domineered for several days together, the spirit of tumult and devastation was finally subdued.

He then went on to direct the jury at length, commenting at one point that these disturbances "seem to have been the necessity of an advance in the wages of husbandry; but the circumstances of some among the offenders do not correspond with the supposition of such an object". He was probably referring to John Dennis, licensed victualler of Littleport. He outlined the three capital offences that would be presented, namely burglary, robbery from the person and stealing in a dwelling house. He defined burglary as breaking into a house at night with intent, robbery from the person as extortion by violence or threat thereof, and stealing in a dwelling house as an actual act of stealing, not just the threat. He reminded the jury that when offences are carried out by a mob, it is the whole mob that is guilty, not just the person doing the deed. He closed:

It is of the highest importance to the peace and safety, not only of this isle, but of the surrounding country, that all who are present on this solemn inquiry, and all who read the account of its proceedings (and there are few parts of the kingdom in which it will not be read) may be convinced by the awful lesson which may here be taught, that whatever wild or chimerical notions may prevail of the power of an armed multitude, the law is too strong for its assailants; and that, however triumphant or destructive their sway for a few days, those who defy the law, will ultimately be compelled to submit either to its justice or its mercy.

The court adjourned until the following day.

=== Tuesday ===
On Tuesday 18 June the court opened at 9 am; 12 defendants were charged with breaking into the house of Rebecca Waddelow in Littleport and stealing personal property and money. After hearing evidence, the judges held a discussion. Mr Justice Abbott informed the jury that a mistake had been made in the indictment, directing the jury to acquit. All 12 defendants were pronounced not guilty.

Seven defendants were then indicted for breaking into the house of Josiah Dewey in Littleport, stealing money and property and assaulting Dewey. Mr Gurney addressed the jury. Three witnesses testified. The jury recorded a verdict of guilty against Chevall, (Note: Chevall, Chevill, and Chevell) Easey, Jessop, South and Benton; Dann and Torrington were acquitted. The court adjourned at 5 pm.

=== Wednesday ===
On Wednesday 19 June the court opened at 9 am; the indictment on three of the defendants was read for forcibly entering the house of Robert Speechly in Littleport and stealing personal property. Mr Gurney addressed the jury, who later pronounced all defendants guilty.

Five defendants were then indicted for forcing their way in the house of Rev. John Vachell in Littleport, threatening him and stealing £2. Mr Gurney addressed the jury. Two witnesses testified. A verdict of guilty was returned against Harley and Newell whilst Warner and Stibbard were acquitted.

Five defendants were then indicted for stealing £50 from the house of Robert Edwards in Ely. Mr Gurney addressed the jury at length describing the events occurring in the town of Ely on the morning of the 23 May 1816. Eight witnesses were called. The jury returned guilty verdicts against Dennis, Jefferson, and Rutter. Hopkin and Cammell were given not guilty verdicts.

=== Thursday ===
On Thursday morning 20 June two defendants were indicted for stealing silverware from the home of Rev. J. Vachell in Littleport and one was charged with receiving the stolen goods. Four witnesses called were Elizabeth Carter following which Mr Justice Burrough summed up. Lavender was pronounced guilty of the theft and Beamiss and Butcher received not guilty verdicts.

John Gaultrip was next, also indicted for stealing spoons at the vicarage. As the evidence was contradictory, Gaultrip was acquitted by the jury.

Next at the bar was William Beamiss indicted for highway robbery of Hugh Robert Evans, of Ely. Two witness were called. Mr Justice Abbott summed up and the jury returned a verdict of guilty on the prisoner Beamiss.

Then nine defendants were charged with threatening W. Cooper of Ely and stealing from him. Mr Gurney addressed the jury, explaining the circumstances of the disturbances carried out by the mob in Ely. Nine witnesses were called. Mr Justice Abbott spoke to the jury for a long time. The jury retired for fifteen minutes. On returning, it pronounced as guilty Dennis, Jessop, Atkin, Layton, Hobbs, Pricke, Cooper, and Jefferson. It acquitted Freeman.

Six defendants were then charged with stealing from George Stevens in Ely. Three witness were examined following which Dennis, Layton, Atkin, and Cammell were all pronounced guilty by the jury. Capital convictions against Aaron Chevall and William Beamiss, for robbing Henry Tansley of two £1 notes, were also returned by the jury. The court adjourned at 6 pm.

=== Friday ===
On Friday morning 21 June, seven prisoners were brought to the bar on a similar charge as on Tuesday (breaking into the house of Rebecca Waddelow in Littleport and stealing personal property and money). The prisoners all pleaded not guilty. Mr Gurney addressed the jury explaining that these were the same persons indicted on Tuesday for the same offence. He explained to the jury that the earlier indictment incorrectly described the house to be the property of Rebecca Waddelow, leading to the prisoners' acquittal. He also explained that in the original indictment, other persons had been charged, but as these other persons had since been convicted of capital offences, they had been removed from the indictment. The witness were all brought forward again and made their statements. They said much the same as previously, though this took much of the day. In summing up, Mr Abbott went on a length closing with "the duty which it belonged to them [the jury] to execute – confident that, from experience which the court had now of them, their verdict would be such as good sense would dictate, and the public justice of the country require". It took the jury five minutes to find Walker, Butcher and Crow guilty and Nicholas, Wilson and Jefferson not guilty.

Brought to the bar next was Henry Benson, a farmer who was out on bail, charged with inciting to riot. Benson was held in surety for £400 plus two other sureties for £200 each. He was to appear for trial at the next assizes. (Note: The solicitors for the crown went into considerable debate for the follow weeks on Bensons case. Meanwhile, Lord Hardwicke had given Benson notice to quit the tenancy of his farm. The authorities eventually dropped the case.) Richard Cooper the elder and Richard Cooper the younger were also bound over to the next assizes. Father and son, William Beamiss the elder and the younger, were then brought in and charged with assaulting and stealing from Robert Cheesewright the younger, of Littleport, in the Isle of Ely. Mr Gurney addressed the jury. Mr Burrough summed up and the jury gave their guilty verdict to both prisoners shortly after.

Next, between 20 and 30 prisoners were brought to the bar and "indicted for having committed various felonies and misdemeanour's at Littleport on 22, 23, and 24 of May last". A few were put to the next assizes and the remainder chose to be tried immediately. Mr Gurney addressed the jury explaining that his Majesty's government was keen not to put to the jury more cases than was necessary. If the prisoners now at the bar offered a small surety and remained on good behaviour, there would be no more said. Mr Abbott spoke to the prisoners at length, finally demanding that each of them offer surety of £50 and find two more sureties each of £10 or one more each of £20. Mr Abbott then thanked the jury for their services. The court adjourned.

=== Sentences ===
Saturday

On Saturday 22 June 1816 six men were acquitted; 10 were discharged; 36 were bailed; 23 men and one woman were condemned of whom 18 men and the woman, Sarah Hobbs, had their sentences commuted. (Note: mitigated is used in the source) Of the 19 persons commuted, nine were sentenced to penal transportation. (Note: Piracy Act 1717 (4 Geo. 1. c. 11)) Seven of those nine sailed on the convict ship Sir William Bensley, which departed for New South Wales on 9 October 1816, captained by Lew E Williams. Records exist for the following known to have sailed: James Newell, Richard Jessop, John Jefferson, Joseph Easey, Aaron Chevell, all of Littleport and all transported for life; Richard Rutter of Littleport for 14 years; John Easey of Littleport for seven years. Two others were also sentenced to transportation for seven years, Mark Benton and John Walker, both of Littleport. 10, including Sarah Hobbs, were committed to Ely gaol for 12 months; five were from Littleport and five, including Sarah Hobbs were from Ely.

The five condemned without commutation were all from Littleport. They were William Beamiss (42) the elder, shoemaker, for stealing from the persons of Henry Tansley and Robert Cheeseright, both of Littleport; George Crow (23), labourer, for stealing in the dwelling-house of Rebecca Waddelow and Henry Martin, both of Littleport; John Dennis (32), a publican, for stealing from the persons of William Cooper, Robert Edwards, and George Stevens, all of Ely; Isaac Harley junior (33), labourer, for stealing from the person of the Reverend John Vachell, of Littleport; and Thomas South the younger (22), labourer, for stealing in the dwelling-house of Josiah Dewey and Robert Speechly, both of Littleport. (Note: all ages from Johnson (1893) except Thomas South from Bell (1994)) (Note: all occupations from Peacock (1965) unless otherwise noted)

Summary of rioters condemned 22 June 1816
Name	Age	Occupation	Village	Counts	Sentence
Beamis, William; the elder	42	shoemaker	Littleport	2	Executed
Crow, George	23	labourer	Littleport	1	Executed
Dennis, John	32	publican	Littleport	3	Executed
Harley, Isaac; the junior	33	labourer	Littleport	1	Executed
South, Thomas; the younger	22	labourer	Littleport	2	Executed
Chevell, Aaron	28	labourer	Littleport	2	Transported life
Easey, Joseph	35	labourer	Littleport	1	Transported life
Jefferson, John	42	labourer	Littleport	2	Transported life
Jessop, Richard	21	labourer	Littleport	2	Transported life
Newell, James	(Note: age not known)	labourer	Littleport	1	Transported life
Rutter, Richard		labourer	Littleport	1	Transported 14 years
Benton, Mark	60	labourer	Littleport	1	Transported 7 years
Easey, John	28	labourer	Littleport	1	Transported 7 years
Walker, John	30	labourer	Littleport	1	Transported 7 years
Atkin, William	28	carpenter	Ely	2	12 months
Beamiss, William; the younger	18	shoemaker	Littleport	2	12 months
Butcher, Robert		labourer	Littleport	1	12 months
Cammell, James	32	labourer	Littleport	1	12 months
Cooper, John		no occupation	Ely	1	12 months
Crabb, Robert	40	labourer	Littleport	1	12 months
Dann, William	43	labourer	Littleport	1	12 months
Hobbs, Sarah	24	labourer	Ely	1	12 months
Layton, Aaron	25	bricklayer	Ely	2	12 months
Pricke, John		potter	Ely	1	12 months

=== Execution ===
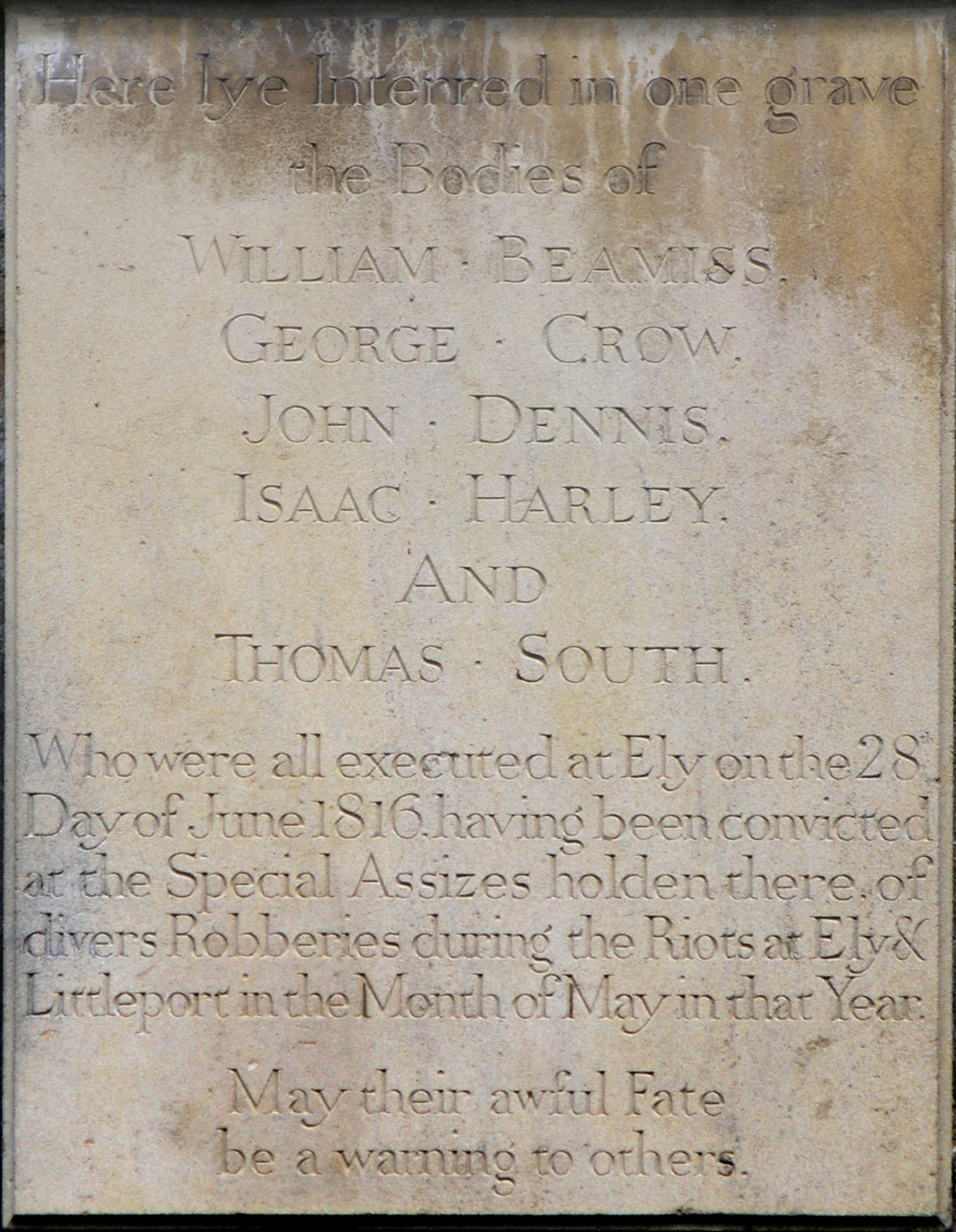
Memorial plaque, on the south wall of the west tower of St Mary's Church, Ely, to the five Ely and Littleport rioters executed in Ely on 28 June 1816

On Friday 28 June 1816 at 9 am, the condemned men, William Beamiss, George Crow, John Dennis, Isaac Harley and Thomas South, were driven from the gaol at Ely market place in a black-draped cart and two horses costing five-pound five-shillings (£442) accompanied by the bishop's gaol chaplain, John Griffin, in a hired chaise and pair costing 13 shillings (£55). In submitting his expenses on 29 June, chief bailiff F. Bagge noted "We have no power of pressing a cart for the purpose, and 'tis a difficult matter to get one, people feel's so much upon the occasion".

The men arrived at the gallows at Parnell pits around 11 am, and were hanged after praying with the crowd for some time. Griffin was unofficially given the ropes, which cost one-pound five-shillings (£105), after hanging, which he kept; he left a collection to his housekeeper, who sold them as a cure for sore throats. Following the hanging, the bodies were placed in coffins and displayed in a cottage in Gaol Street, where many people came to visit. They were buried the next day in St Mary's Church, Ely, with the vicar's blessing. As a warning to others, a stone plaque (pictured) was installed on the west side of St Mary's Church; it concludes, "May their awful Fate be a warning to others".

In 1816, there were a total of 83 people executed in England: 80 men, including the five Littleport rioters, and three women.

== Aftermath ==
A few days after the execution, the ten condemned prisoners who had had their sentences commuted to twelve months' imprisonment were transported to the prison hulk Justitia, moored at Woolwich on the River Thames. Such ships were used as holding areas prior to convicts being transferred to a regular vessel for penal transportation to, at this time, Australia. Residents of Ely tried to hold meetings to complain at this apparent extension of the prisoners' sentences. Despite, or because of, media attention—newspapers of the time took sides depending whether they supported the government or not—the prisoners were returned to Ely gaol; it may all have been a simple mistake by the clerk of the assizes.

On 3 April 1816, lieutenant-colonel William Sorell was appointed lieutenant-governor of Van Diemen's Land, now Tasmania. He sailed on the Sir William Bensley, the same ship transporting the rioters sentenced to penal transportation. Leaving England on 9 October 1816, the ship arrived in New South Wales 152 days later on 10 March 1817. Soon after, Sorrel sailed to Hobart arriving on 8 April 1817, where he distinguished himself as the third lieutenant-governor.

John Vachell remained vicar of St George's, Littleport, until his death in 1830, but lived elsewhere and a series of curates were appointed, including George Bitton Jermyn from 1817. Vachell was buried in the churchyard of St Peter and St Paul's Church, Aldeburgh where there is a gravestone inset into the church wall. Some of the St George's church registers were destroyed during the riots. The remaining registers start from 1754 (marriages), 1756 (burials), and 1783 (baptism). General unrest and riots such as that at Littleport may have been a factor in the government passing the Vagrancy Act 1824 (5 Geo. 4. c. 83). Due in part to some difficulties in enforcing the law and to continued public unease, the Metropolitan Police Act 1829 (10 Geo. 4. c. 44) was created leading to the first modern police force.

== See also ==
- Year Without a Summer—1816 summer had severe climate abnormalities resulting in major food shortages across the Northern Hemisphere
- The Fool—a 1975 play by Edward Bond, charting the life of rural poet John Clare and involving him in the Littleport riots
