= St Mary's Church, Ely =

St Mary's Church
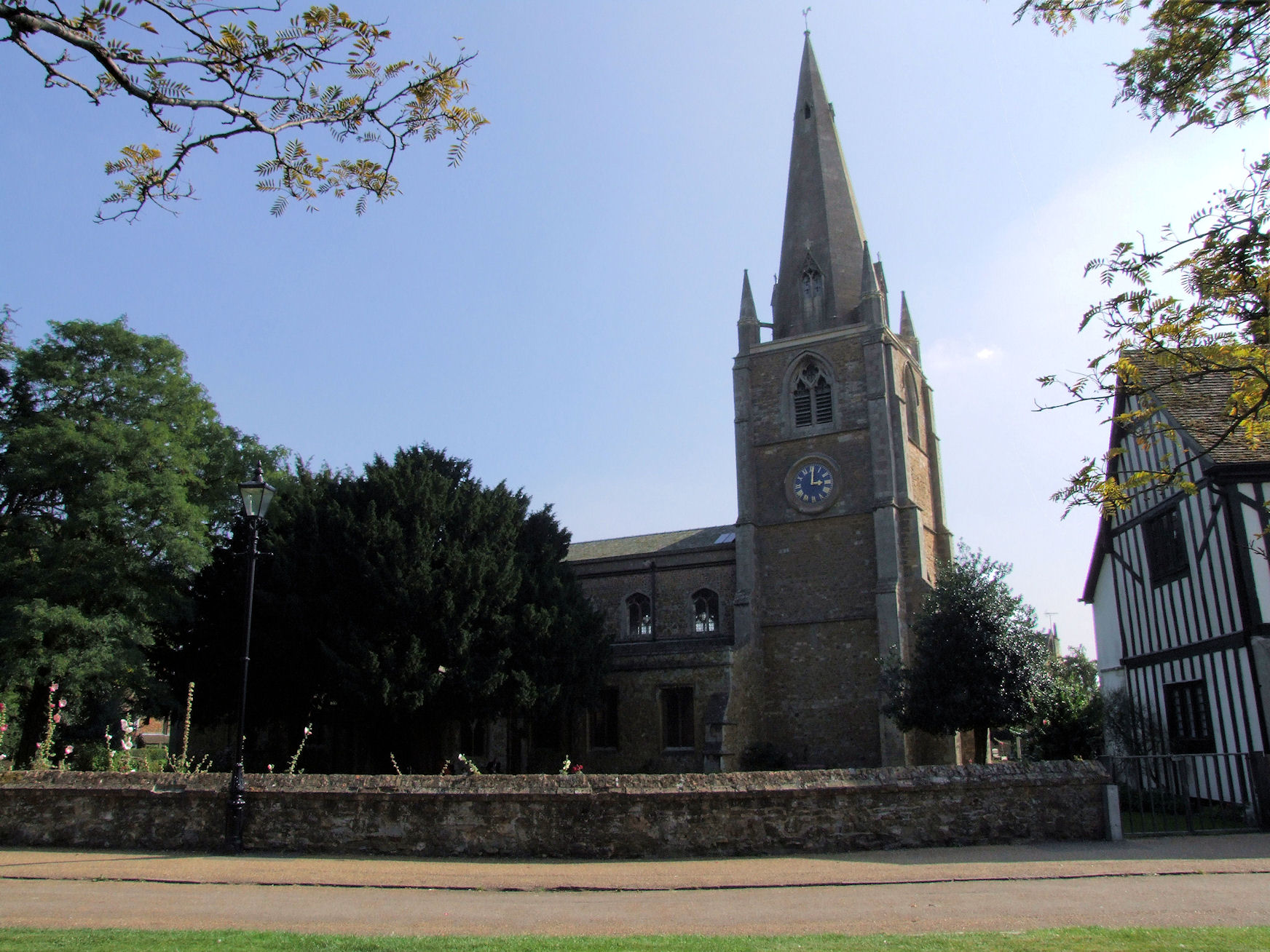
- St Mary's Church, Ely
- St Mary's Church
- 52°23′55″N 0°15′35″E
- Denomination: Church of England
- Churchmanship: Evangelical Anglicanism
- Website: St Mary's Ely

History
- Founder: Bishop Eustace
- Dedication: Saint Mary the Virgin

Architecture
- Functional status: Parish church
- Heritage designation: Grade I
- Designated: 23 September 1950
- Architectural type: Church

Administration
- Diocese: Ely
- Archdeaconry: Huntingdon and Wisbech
- Deanery: Ely
- Parish: Ely

St Mary's Church is a church in Ely, Cambridgeshire, located near Ely Cathedral to the west of the Bishop's Palace.

Principally constructed in the 13th century, it was designated as a Grade I listed building in 1950.

Sextry Barn, which stood immediately to the west of the churchyard, was a large 13th-century tithe barn. It was demolished in 1842.
