= Everilda =

7th century Christian saint

Saint Everilda of Everingham
- Died: c. 700
- Venerated in: Catholic Church; Church of England
- Feast: 9 July

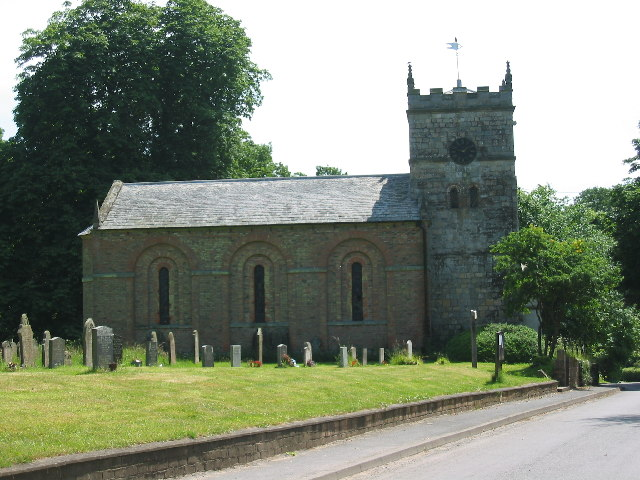
St Everilda's Church (Church of England) at Everingham

Saint Everilda of Everingham (Old English: Eoforhild, died. c. 700) was an Anglo-Saxon saint of the 7th century who founded a convent at Everingham, in the English county of the East Riding of Yorkshire. All we know of her comes from the York Breviary.

== Biography ==
Everilda was converted to Christianity by Saint Birinus, along with King Cynegils of Wessex, in 635. Her legend in the York Breviary states that she was of the Wessex nobility. She fled from home to become a nun, and was joined by Saints Bega and Wuldreda. Saint Wilfrid of York made them all nuns at a place called the Bishop's Dwelling, later known as Everildisham. This place has been identified with present-day Everingham. She gathered a large community of some eighty women.

Everilda died peacefully when her mission was accomplished.

== Veneration ==
Her name appears in the Martyrology of Usuard as well as in the church calendars of York and Northumbria.

There are three churches dedicated to St Everilda: St Everilda's Church, Nether Poppleton, St Everilda's Church, Everingham and Ss Mary & Everilda, Everingham.

Everilda's feast day is 9 July.
