= All Saints' Church, Upper Poppleton =

Grade II listed church in York, England

Coordinates: 53°58′46″N 1°09′16″W

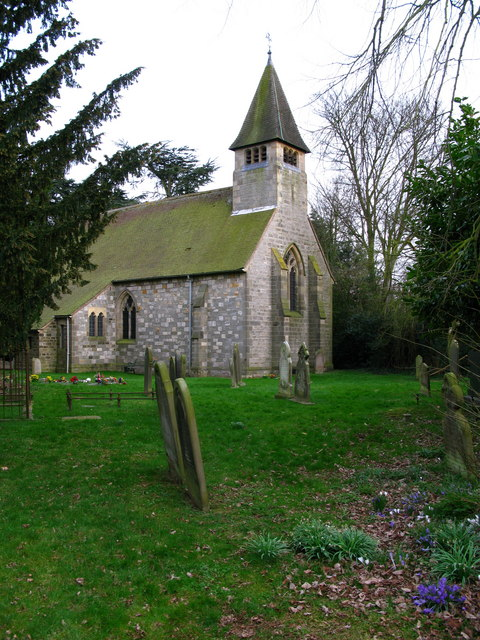
- The church, in 2009
- All Saints' Church, Upper Poppleton
- OS grid reference: SE 55546 54045
- Location: Upper Poppleton, North Yorkshire
- Country: England
- Denomination: Church of England
- Website: A Church Near You: All Saints'

Architecture
- Heritage designation: Grade II listed
- Architect: C. Hodgson Fowler
- Years built: 1890

Administration
- Diocese: York
- Archdeaconry: York
- Deanery: York
- Parish: Nether Poppleton with Upper Poppleton

Clergy
- Vicar: The Revd Simon Biddlestone

All Saints' Church is the parish church of Upper Poppleton, a village in the rural north-western part of the City of York district, in the ceremonial county of North Yorkshire, England. It is a Grade II listed building.

== History ==
A chapel was built on the site in the Norman period, serving as a chapel within the parish of St Mary Bishophill Junior. In 1844, it became part of the new parish of Copmanthorpe with Upper Poppleton; then in 1866 it was moved into a parish of Nether Poppleton with Upper Poppleton. In 1848, the church was described as "a neat edifice".

The original church was demolished in 1890, and replaced by a new building, designed by C. Hodgson Fowler, which was completed the following year.

The church is built of stone and has a small tower at the west end. Its main body consists of a nave and chancel There is a porch on the south side, sheltering the main entrance, a Norman doorway reused from the old church. The vestry is on the north side, and it is linked to the church by a connection designed by George Pace and built about 1964. Inside, the roof structure is wooden and is prominent, its trusses alternating in design. The pews are Victorian, while the choir stalls, altar and altar rail were designed by Pace about 1965. The font is 13th century and has an octagonal stem and a plain stone bowl.

== Present day ==
All Saints' Church is combined with the nearby St Everilda's Church, Nether Poppleton to form the parish of Nether Poppleton with Upper Poppleton. This parish is part of the Archdeaconry of York in the Diocese of York.

== Gallery ==
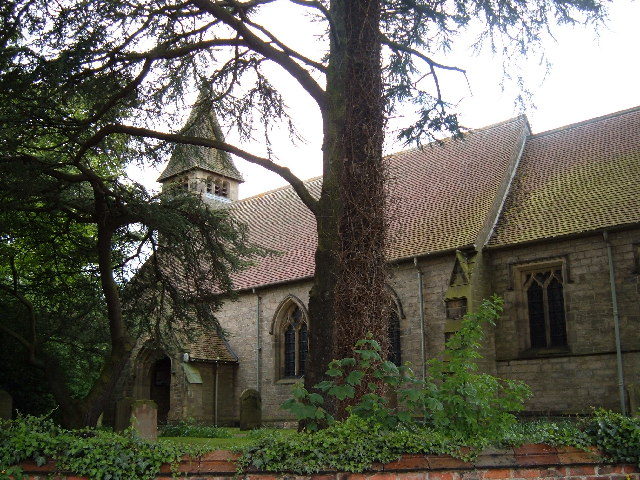
The church, from the south

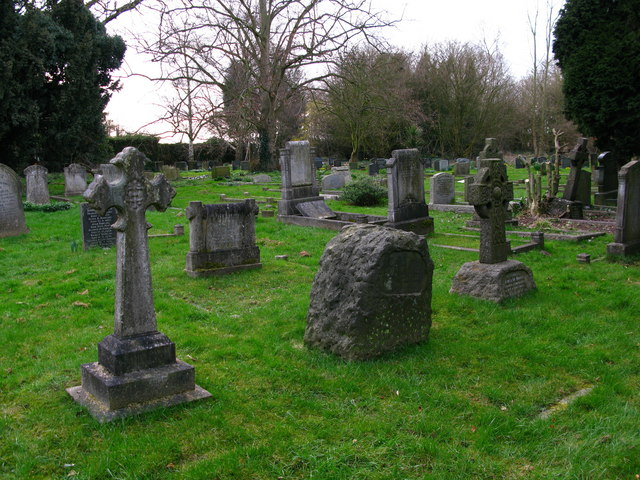
Churchyard

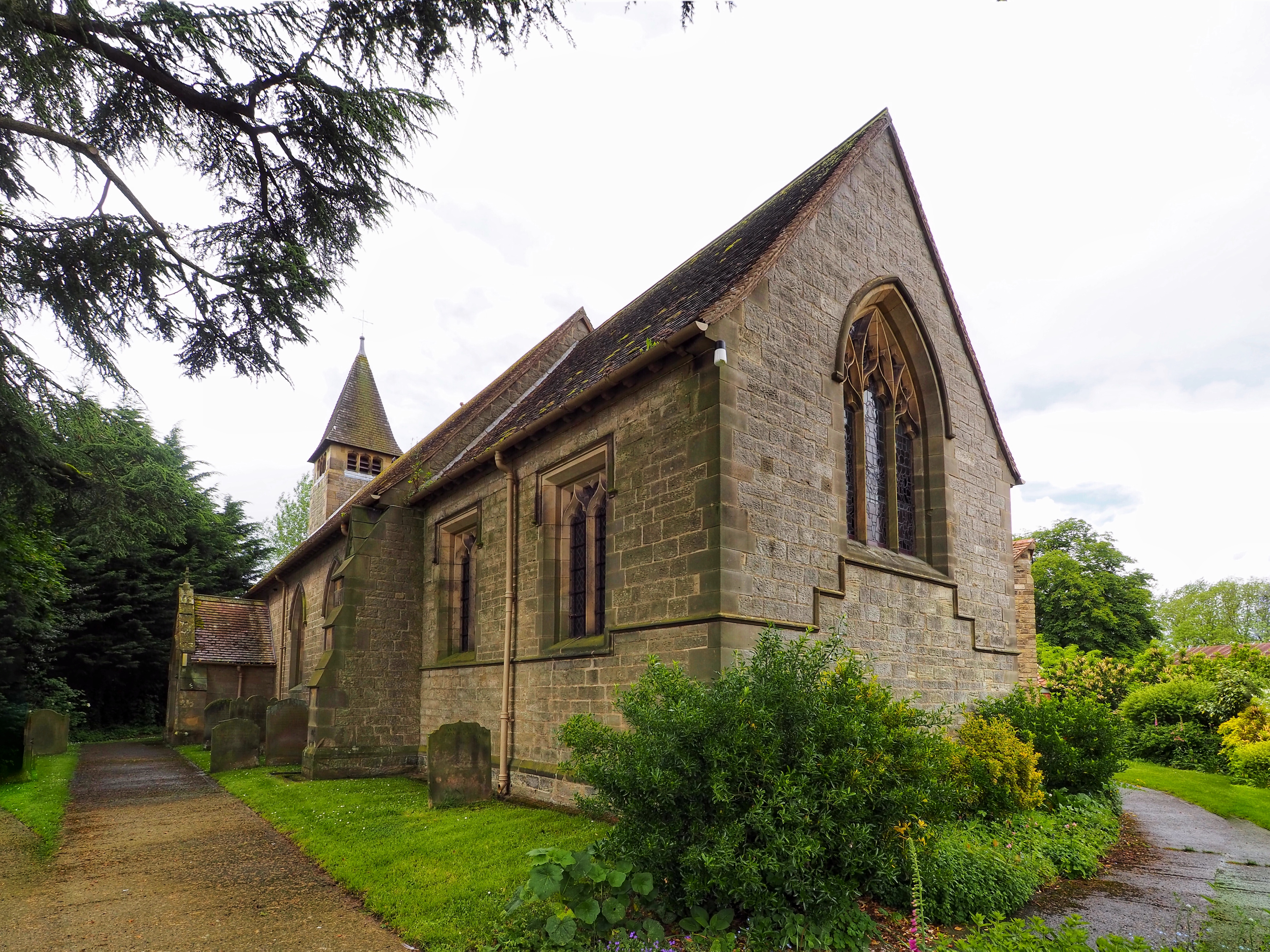
East end of the church
