= Harswell =

Village in the East Riding of Yorkshire, England

Coordinates: 53.857764°N 0.745652°W

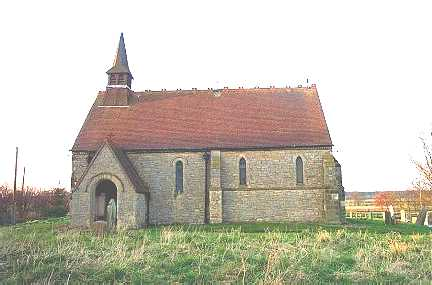
- St Peter's church

- Location within the East Riding of Yorkshire
- OS grid reference: SE826409
  - London: 165 mi (266 km) S
- Civil parish: Everingham
- Unitary authority: East Riding of Yorkshire
- Ceremonial county: East Riding of Yorkshire
- Region: Yorkshire and the Humber
- Country: England
- Sovereign state: United Kingdom
- Post town: YORK
- Postcode district: YO42
- Dialling code: 01430
- Police: Humberside
- Fire: Humberside
- Ambulance: Yorkshire
- UK Parliament: Goole and Pocklington

Harswell is a village and former civil parish, now in the parish of Everingham, in the East Riding of Yorkshire, England. It is approximately 3.5 miles (5.6 km) west of Market Weighton town centre, 5 miles (8 km) south of Pocklington town centre, and 1 mile (1.6 km) west of the A614 road. In 1931 the parish had a population of 78.

In 1823 Harswell was a village and civil parish in the Wapentake of Harthill. Population at the time was 78, with occupations that included five farmers, and a carrier who operated between the village and Market Weighton once a week. On 1 April 1935 the parish was abolished and merged with Everingham.

The name Harswell derives from the Old English Hersawella meaning 'Hersa's spring'.

The village church is dedicated to St Peter. There has been a church in Harswell from the late 12th century and the building that was present in 1823 was described by Baines as "a small ancient structure". It was rebuilt in 1870-1871 and parish records, dating back to 1653, are held by the Borthwick Institute in York.

Harswell was served by Everingham railway station on the Selby to Driffield Line between 1853 and 1954. The station house is now a Grade II listed building.

== See also ==
- Listed buildings in Everingham
