= Sextry Barn, Ely =

Sextry Barn
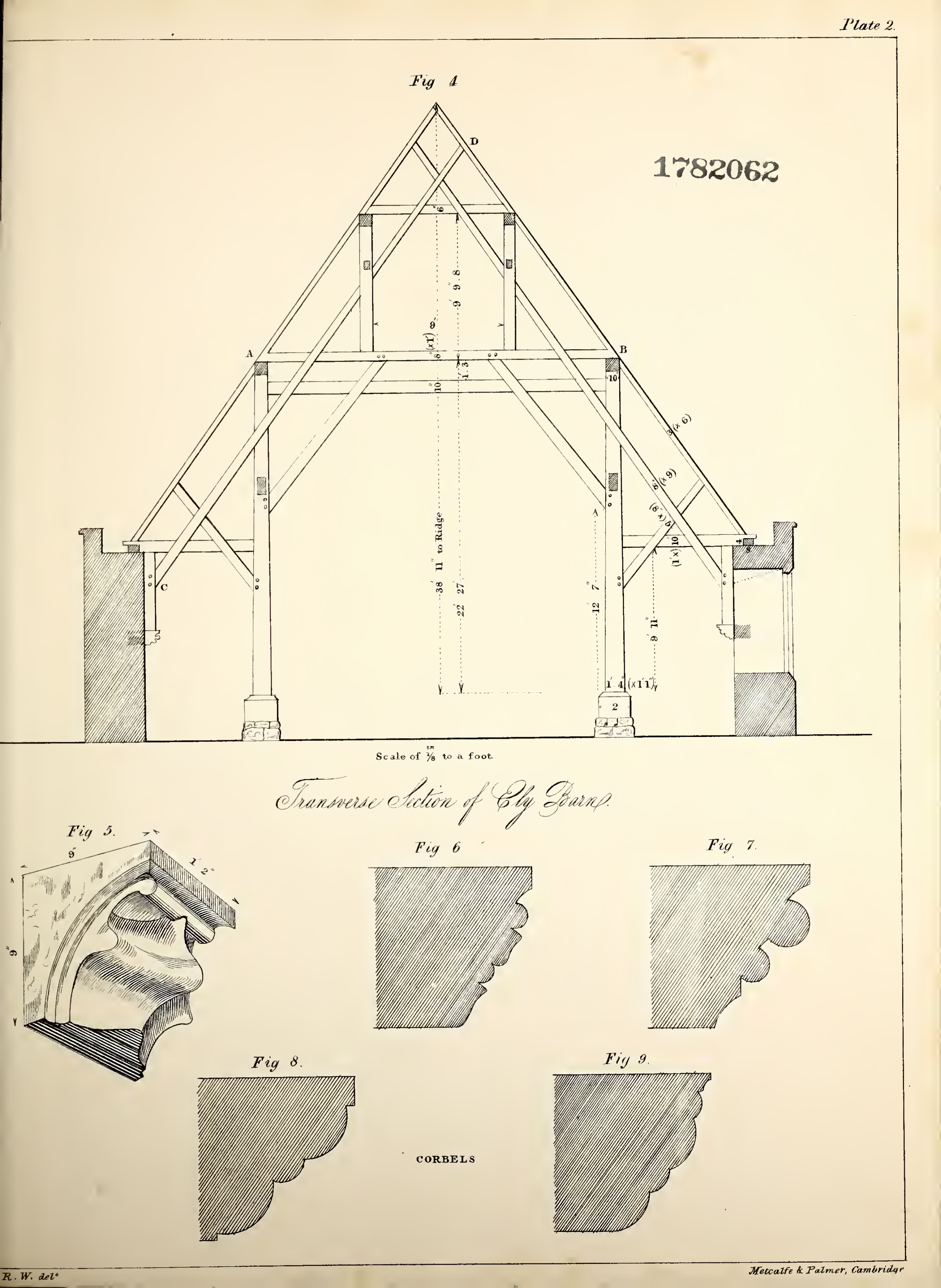
- Sextry Barn Ely Transverse Section Willis 1843
- Interactive map of the Sextry Barn area

General information
- Location: Ely, England
- Coordinates: 52.3985°N 0.259°E
- Completed: 13th century
- Demolished: October 1842

Technical details
- Size: 209ft (interior length)

The Sextry Barn was a 13th-century tithe barn in Ely, Cambridgeshire, England. It was one of the largest medieval barns in Europe, and was demolished in October 1842. It was used to store the corn tithes due to Ely Cathedral, and took its name from the sacrist of the monastery who was in charge of it.

The barn lay to the west of St Mary's Church, and adjacent to Oliver Cromwell's House. It was about 209 ft (64 m) in length internally with masonry walls approximately 4 ft (1.2 m) thick. The roof was supported by a double range of oak piers separating it into central and side aisles.
