= Tithe barns in Europe =

Barn used for storing rents and tithes

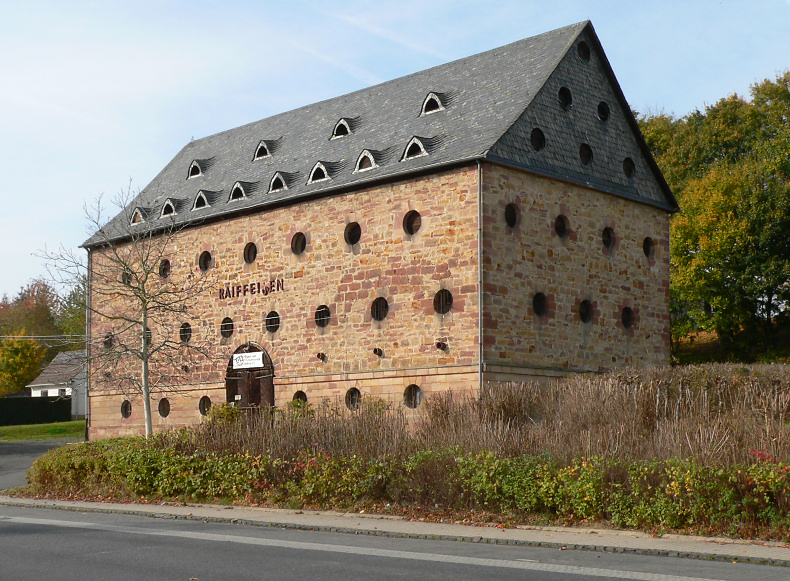
Former tithe barn in Jesberg, Germany

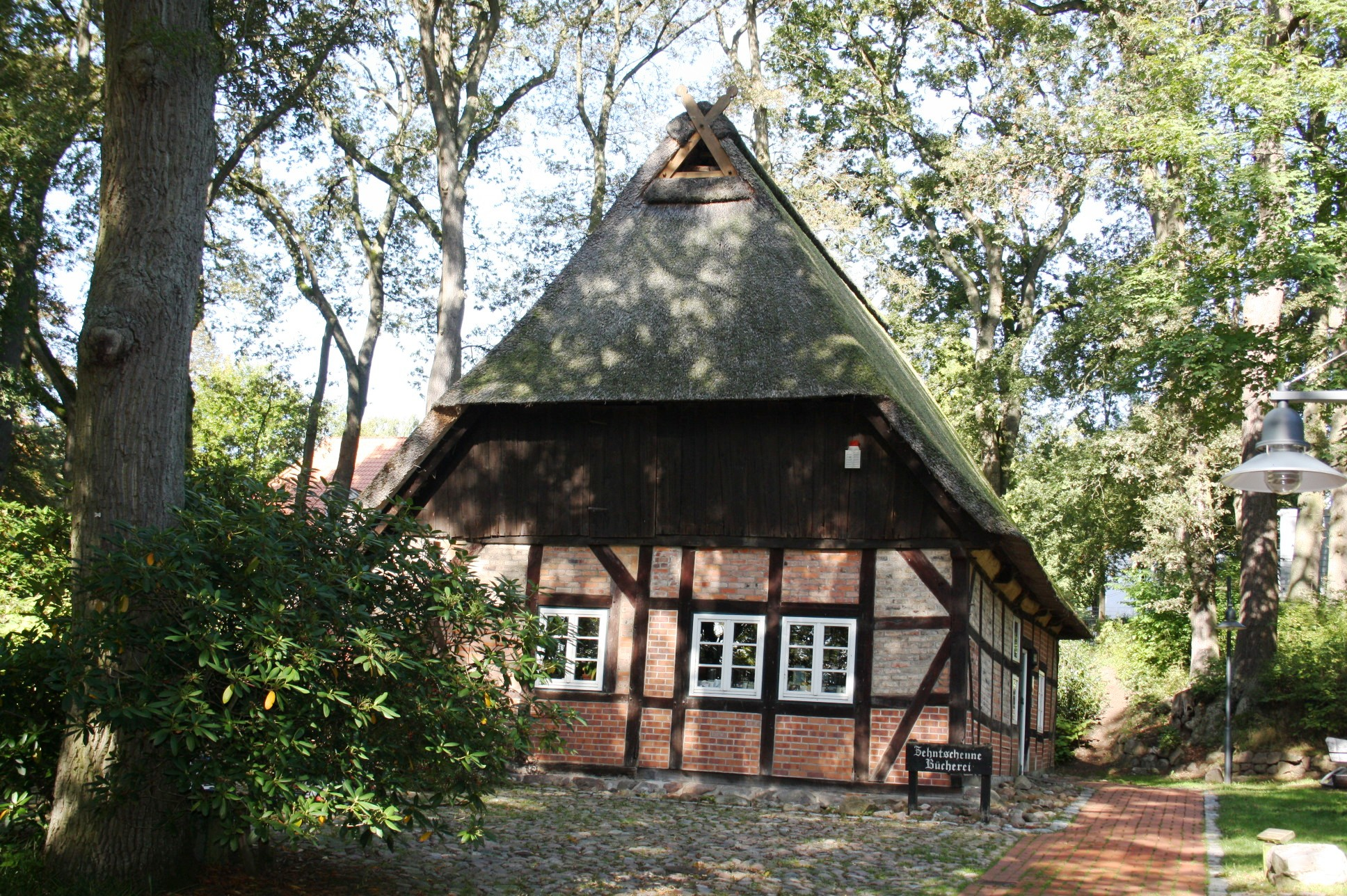
Tithe barn in Jesteburg, Germany

Inside the Bradford-on-Avon tithe barn (Wiltshire, England)

A tithe barn was a type of barn used in much of northern Europe in the Middle Ages for storing rents and tithes. Farmers were required to give one-tenth of their produce to the established church. Tithe barns were usually associated with the village church or rectory, and independent farmers took their tithes there. The village priests did not have to pay tithes—the purpose of the tithe being their support. Some operated their own farms anyway. The former church property has sometimes been converted to village greens.

Many were monastic barns, originally used by the monastery itself or by a monastic grange. The word 'grange' is (indirectly) derived from Latin granarium ('granary'). Identical barns were found on royal domains and country estates.

The medieval aisled barn was developed in the 12th and 13th centuries, following the examples of royal halls, hospitals and market halls. Its predecessors included Roman horrea and Neolithic long houses.

According to English Heritage, "exactly how barns in general were used in the Middle Ages is less well understood than might be expected, and the subject abounds with myths (for example, not one of England's surviving architecturally impressive barns was a tithe barn, although such barns existed)".

== Examples ==
=== England ===
==== Medieval ====
There are surviving examples of medieval barns in England, some of them known as "tithe barns". English Heritage established criteria to determine if barns were used as tithe barns. The total number of surviving medieval barns (dated up to 1550) in Britain may be estimated about 200.

- Aberford C of E Primary School, Aberford, Leeds (Aberford School was based on a redundant tithe barn)
- Bank Hall Barn, Bretherton, Lancashire
- The Bishop's Barn, Wells, Somerset
- Bishop's Cleeve Tithe Barn, Gloucestershire
- The Tithe Barn at Thyme, Southrop Estate Gloucestershire
- Bradford on Avon Tithe Barn, Wiltshire
- Carlisle Tithe Barn
- Church of the Holy Ghost, Midsomer Norton, Somerset
- The Corbett Theatre, Loughton, which was the tithe barn at Ditchling
- Cressing Temple
- East Riddlesden Hall (National Trust)
- The Great Barn, Bourn
- The Great Barn, Ruislip, London
- The Great Barn, Titchfield
- The Great Barn, Wanborough, Surrey
- Great Coxwell Tithe Barn, Oxfordshire
- Haddenham tithe barn, Buckinghamshire
- Harmondsworth Great Barn, Harmondsworth, London
- Landbeach Tithe Barn, Landbeach, Cambridgeshire
- Middle Littleton tithe barn
- Nether Poppleton Tithebarn, City of York
- Parish Hall and Rectory Chapel, Freshwater, Isle of Wight
- Sextry Barn, Ely
- Swalcliffe Barn, Oxfordshire
- Tisbury Tithe Barn, Place Farm, Wiltshire
- Tithe Barn, Dunster
- Tithe Barn, Maidstone, Kent
- Tithe Barn, Manor Farm, Doulting, Somerset
- Tithe Barn, Pilton, Somerset
- Upminster Tithe Barn, Upminster, London
- Upper Heyford tithe barn, Oxfordshire
- West Pennard Court Barn

==== Later ====
There are many extant barns that date from after the Medieval period and may be called "tithe barns" by their owners or councils. These include:

- Loseley Park tithe barn (17th century)
- Melling Tithebarn, Merseyside (c. 18th century)

=== Scotland ===
- Barn Church, Culloden

=== Germany ===
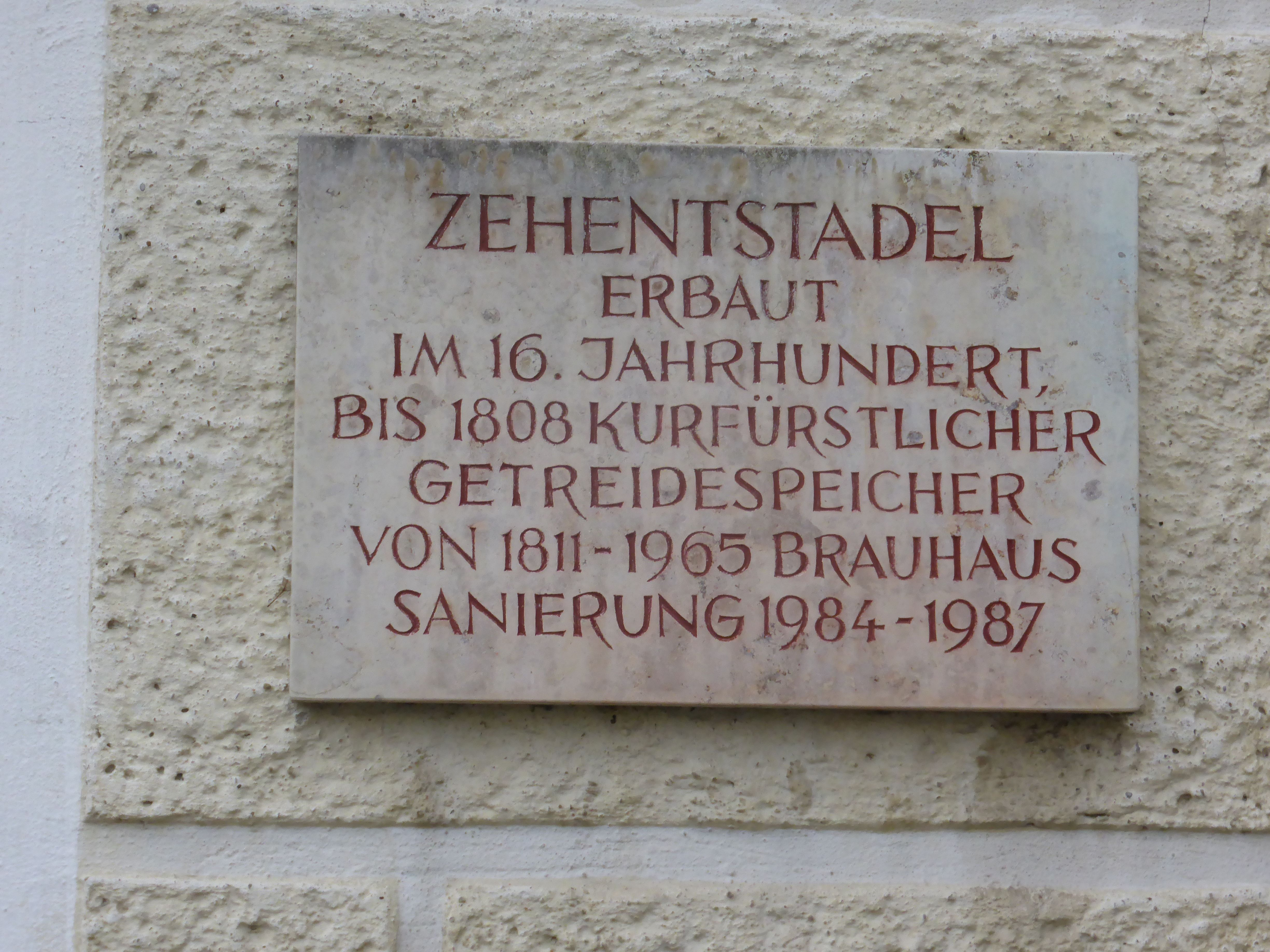
Plaque on the Zehentstadel in Beratzhausen, noting that in the 19th century it housed a brewery. Today it is a cultural centre.

In German, a tithe barn is a Zehntscheune or Zehentstadel. In small towns these are commonly found in small towns, where they have frequently been redeployed for other purposes.

- Castle of Lissingen, Rhineland-Palatinate

=== France ===
- Ardenne Abbey in Saint-Germain-la-Blanche-Herbe (12th century)
- Chenu (13th century)
- Dammarie-en-Puisaye
- Écouen (14th–17th century)
- Grange aux dîmes de Ouistreham
- Grange de Meslay
- Grange dimière, Tremblay-en-France (13th century)
- Maroilles Abbey (1735)
- Maubuisson Abbey (13th century)
- Perrières (13th Century), listed as a Monument historique.
- Priory of Le Mont Saint-Michel (Ardevon)
- Samoreau (13th century)
- Silve Bénite in Le Pin (12th century)
- Wallers
- Wissous (13th century)

=== Belgium ===
- 13th-century tithe barn of Ter Doest Abbey
- Herkenrode Abbey near Hasselt

=== Switzerland ===
- Fürstenhaus Berneck in Berneck, St. Gallen

== See also ==
- Bishop's storehouse
- Staddle stones: Function
- Tithe map
