= St Everilda's Church, Everingham =

Church in Everingham, East Riding of Yorkshire, England

Coordinates: 53°52′15″N 0°46′43″W

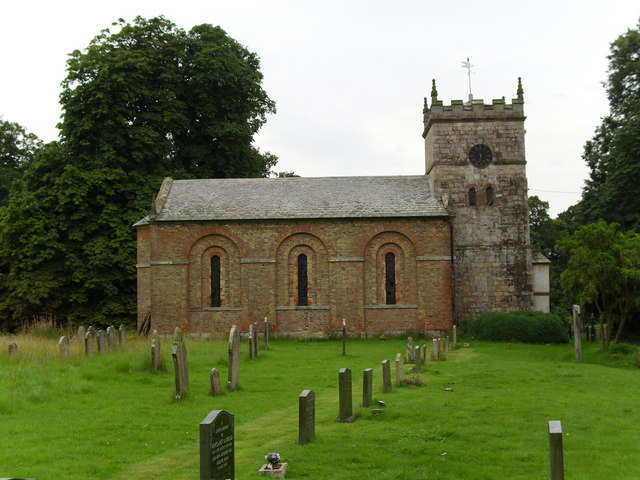
The church, in 2009

St Everilda's Church is the parish church of Everingham, a village in the East Riding of Yorkshire, in England.

The oldest part of the church is the tower, which was built in the 13th century, heightened in the 15th century, and remodelled in 1588. The remainder of the church was rebuilt around 1763 to a design by John Carr, who also rebuilt nearby Everingham Hall. Some of the windows were narrowed in the 19th century. The church was grade II* listed in 1967.

The tower is built of stone, the body of the church is red brick, and the roof is slate. The church consists of a nave with a canted apse, and a west tower with a porch. The tower has three stages, a small rectangular window, a chamfered band, and round-headed bell openings. Above them is a band and an embattled parapet with crocketed corner pinnacles. The west doorway has a round-arched head, and on the south wall is a datestone. Along the sides of the church are three round-arched recesses containing lancet windows, and at the east end is a Venetian window. Inside, there is a brass memorial to Jane Constable, who died in 1558. The elaborately-carved Everingham Font, probably dating from around 1130, is believed to have been made for the church.

== See also ==
- Grade II* listed buildings in the East Riding of Yorkshire
- Listed buildings in Everingham
