= Everingham (surname) =

Everingham is a surname. Notable people with the surname include:

- Ananda Everingham (born 1982), Thai actor
- Doug Everingham (born 1923), Australian politician
- John Everingham (born 1949), Australian journalist
- Matthew Everingham (1769–1817), convict
- Paul Everingham (born 1943), Australian politician
