= Everingham Hall =

Building in the East Riding of Yorkshire, England

Coordinates: 53°52′09″N 0°46′32″W

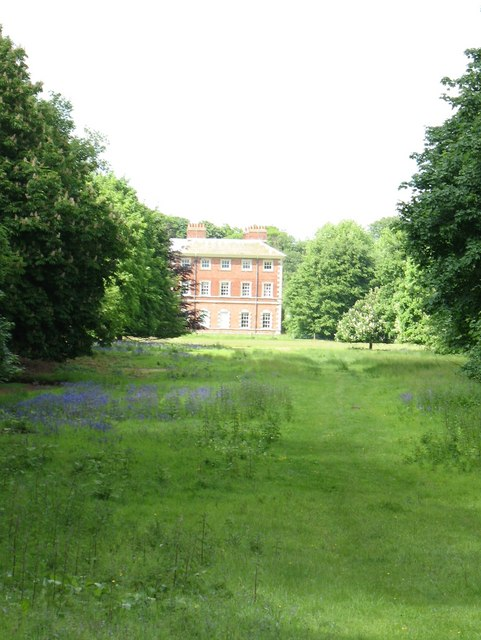
The building, in 2009

Everingham Hall is a historic building in Everingham, a village in the East Riding of Yorkshire, in England.

William Haggerston Constable inherited the Everingham Park estate in 1746, with a mediaeval house, altered in the 17th century. He had the house demolished, and a replacement constructed between 1757 and 1764, to a design by John Carr. In the 1830s, the Catholic chapel of Ss Mary & Everilda, Everingham was constructed near the house. Between 1845 and 1848, the house was enlarged to designs by James Firth. He added a north extension, connected the house to the chapel, and created a new entrance, replacing the main staircase. From 1946, the house served as a country club, but in 1962, Anne Fitzalan-Howard converted it back into a private house. The work was designed by Francis Johnson, and undid the changes of the 1840s. The building was grade I listed in 1967.

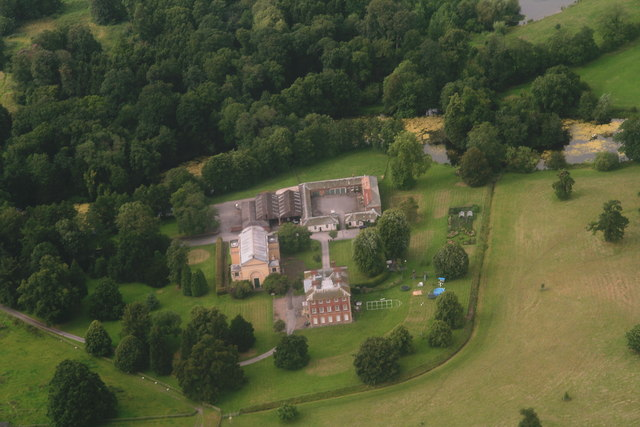
Aerial view of the hall and outbuildings

The house is built of red brick, with stone quoins and a slate roof. The entrance front has three storeys and seven bays, the middle three bays projecting under a pediment. The front has a plinth, rusticated quoins, a floor band and sill bands, modillion eaves and raking cornices, and a hipped roof. On the front is a Doric porch with an entablature and a pediment, and a doorway with a fanlight. The windows are sashes, those on the ground floor with Gibbs surrounds, and above with architraves.

Inside, many of the original interiors survive. The dining room has a multicoloured marble fireplace with a relief of a sheepdog and sheep and there are other original fireplaces by Henry Cheere, woodwork and plasterwork. The main staircase is a reproduction of Carr's original, dating from the 1960s restoration.

== See also ==
- Grade I listed buildings in the East Riding of Yorkshire
- Listed buildings in Everingham
