= Everingham =

Village in the East Riding of Yorkshire, England

Coordinates: 53°52′22″N 0°46′41″W

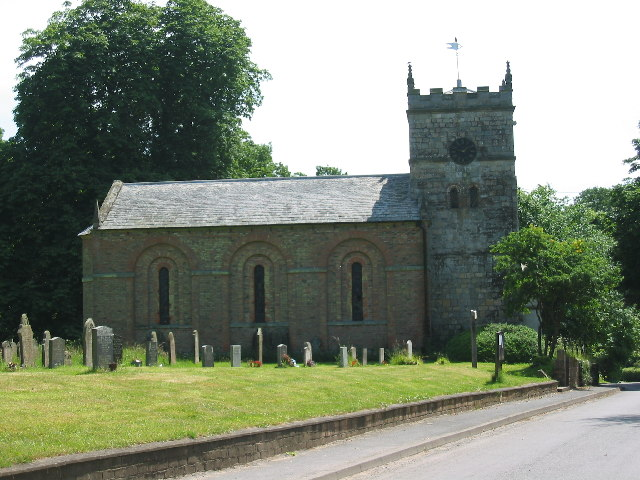
- St Everilda's; Church of England parish church

- Location within the East Riding of Yorkshire
- OS grid reference: SE804424
  - London: 160 mi (260 km) S
- Civil parish: Everingham
- Unitary authority: East Riding of Yorkshire
- Ceremonial county: East Riding of Yorkshire
- Region: Yorkshire and the Humber
- Country: England
- Sovereign state: United Kingdom
- Post town: York
- Postcode district: YO42
- Dialling code: 01430
- Police: Humberside
- Fire: Humberside
- Ambulance: Yorkshire
- UK Parliament: Goole and Pocklington

Everingham parish in the East Riding of Yorkshire

Everingham is a village in the East Riding of Yorkshire, England. It is 5 miles (8 km) west of Market Weighton town centre and 4 miles (6 km) south of Pocklington town centre.

The village lies in a civil parish also officially called "Everingham" by the Office for National Statistics, although the county council and parish council refer to it as Everingham and Harswell since the parish also includes the nearby village of Harswell. According to the 2011 UK census, it had a population of 304, a decrease on the 2001 UK census figure of 320, and covers an area of 1,662.03 hectares (4,107.0 acres).

== History ==
There are two competing theories as to the origins of the village's name. Firstly, the theory that the village is named after St. Everilda, the daughter of the 7th-century King Cyneglis of the West Saxons, who fled her home to practise Christianity in seclusion. Upon reaching York she was allowed to set up a convent at a place that came to be known as 'Everildsham' (Everild's home), which some believe to have evolved into the current name; Everingham. No trace of the convent survives and the former location is unknown. The second theory is that the name is derived from 'Eofor's Ham', meaning the 'ham' (home) of Eofor's people, who may have been a Saxon tribe in the area. Eofor is a Saxon word meaning 'Wild Boar' and was commonly used in that era as a name, for example as the name of a warrior in the Saxon epic Beowulf.

The next historical mention of the village comes in Domesday Book, when its population was recorded as 22. Though a small village for the time it paid a large amount of tax relative to other comparable villages. The value of the village had decreased considerably by 1086, however, probably as a result of the widespread destruction caused by William the Conqueror during his campaign to suppress rebellion in the north. After that time the village grew in prosperity, largely thanks to the presence of Everingham Hall, which gradually became the seat of the estate land and property in the area and contributed to the development of nearby villages such as Seaton Ross. The current hall is a Grade I Listed structure built between 1757 and 1764 by John Carr.

In 1823 Everingham was in the Wapentake of Harthill. The then "neat modern church" was dedicated to the Blessed Virgin Mary. There was also a Roman Catholic chapel. Population at the time was 271, with occupations including thirteen farmers, one of whom was a farrier, a carpenter, a shopkeeper, and a shoemaker. A tailor was the landlord of The Ship public house, and a blacksmith was the parish clerk. There was a schoolmaster, a rector of the church who was also church patron, a steward for William Constable-Maxwell, later the 10th Lord Herries of Terregles, described as a minor, and Mrs Constable-Maxwell of the 'Hall'.

The village has two churches, both dedicated to St Everilda; St Everilda's Church, Everingham (Church of England) and Ss Mary & Everilda, Everingham, (Roman Catholic). The latter church was designated a Grade I listed building in 1967 and is now recorded in the National Heritage List for England, maintained by Historic England, whilst the former was designated as Grade II*. There is only one other church in Britain dedicated to this saint, St Everilda's Church, Nether Poppleton, in the City of York. In a shrine to the saint in Half-Acre Lane harebells bloom and are referred to as 'the holy harebells of St Everilda'. An elaborately carved gravestone set into the floor of the nearby ancient church of St Peter in Harswell might mark the grave of St Everilda.

The Ham class minesweeper HMS Everingham was named after the village.

The Everingham railway station was also named after the village.

== See also ==
- Listed buildings in Everingham
