= St Everilda's Church, Nether Poppleton =

Grade II* listed church in York, England

Coordinates: 53.9884°N 1.1406°W

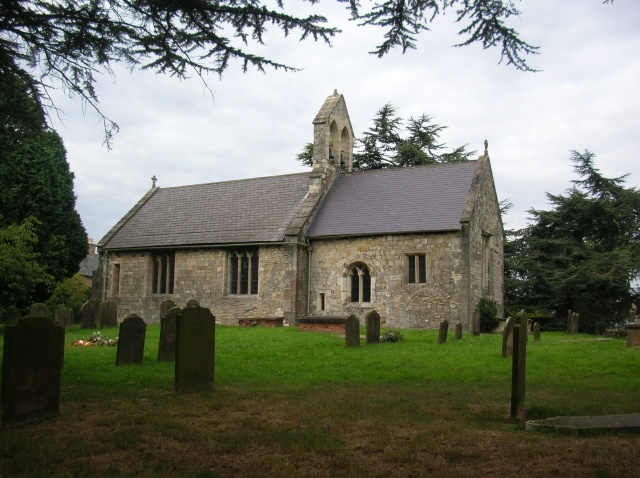
- The church, in 2007
- St Everilda's Church, Nether Poppleton
- OS grid reference: SE 56449 55046
- Location: Nether Poppleton, North Yorkshire
- Country: England
- Denomination: Church of England
- Website: A Church Near You: St Everilda's

Architecture
- Heritage designation: Grade II* listed
- Designated: 1966

Administration
- Diocese: York
- Archdeaconry: York
- Deanery: York
- Parish: Nether Poppleton with Upper Poppleton

Clergy
- Vicar: The Revd Simon Biddlestone

St Everilda's Church lies in Nether Poppleton, a village immediately north-west of York, in England.

== History ==
The church is one of only two in the country dedicated to Everilda, an Anglo-Saxon saint who established a monastic community which may have been in Poppleton, although it is usually placed in Everingham. A church was in existence by 1088, at which time its advowson was granted to the newly founded St Mary's Abbey, York.

The church was rebuilt in the twelfth century, and much of the material from that period survives. It is built of limestone, some finely cut and other sections of rubble. In 1778, galleries were added on the north and west side of the nave, and part of the north wall was rebuilt in brick. Further alterations took place in the 19th century, and the west door probably dates from this period.

Some of the windows in the chancel contain 14th-century stained glass, while those in the nave are square-headed and of later date. In the chancel, there are three 17th-century memorials to members of the Hutton family. In the east wall of the vestry is a carving of a cross, believed to date from the 13th century.

In 1939, a new altar, carved by Robert Thompson, was installed. An extension was added in 2015, providing a kitchen and storage space. The building has been grade II* listed since 1966.

== Present day ==
The Church of St Everilda is combined with the nearby All Saints' Church, Upper Poppleton to form the parish of Nether Poppleton with Upper Poppleton. This parish is part of the Archdeaconry of York in the Diocese of York.

== Gallery ==
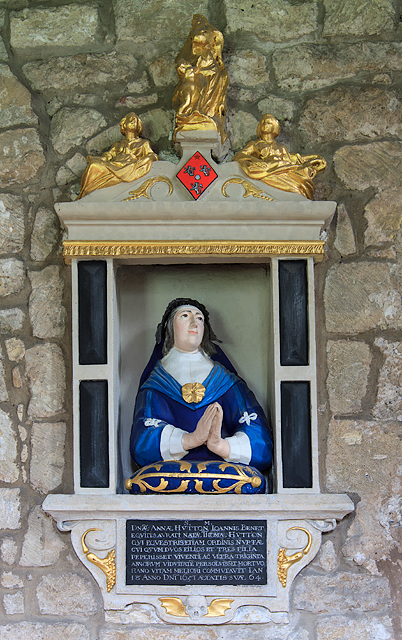
Monument to Anne Hutton

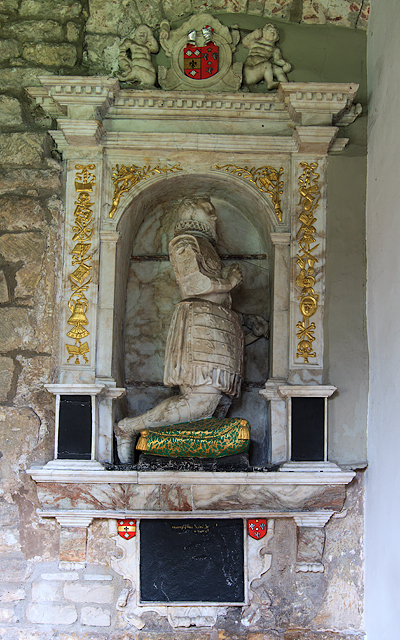
Monument to Sir Thomas Hutton (1581–1620)
