= Ss Mary & Everilda, Everingham =

Coordinates: 53.869300°N 0.776100°W

Chapel of Ss Mary & Everilda
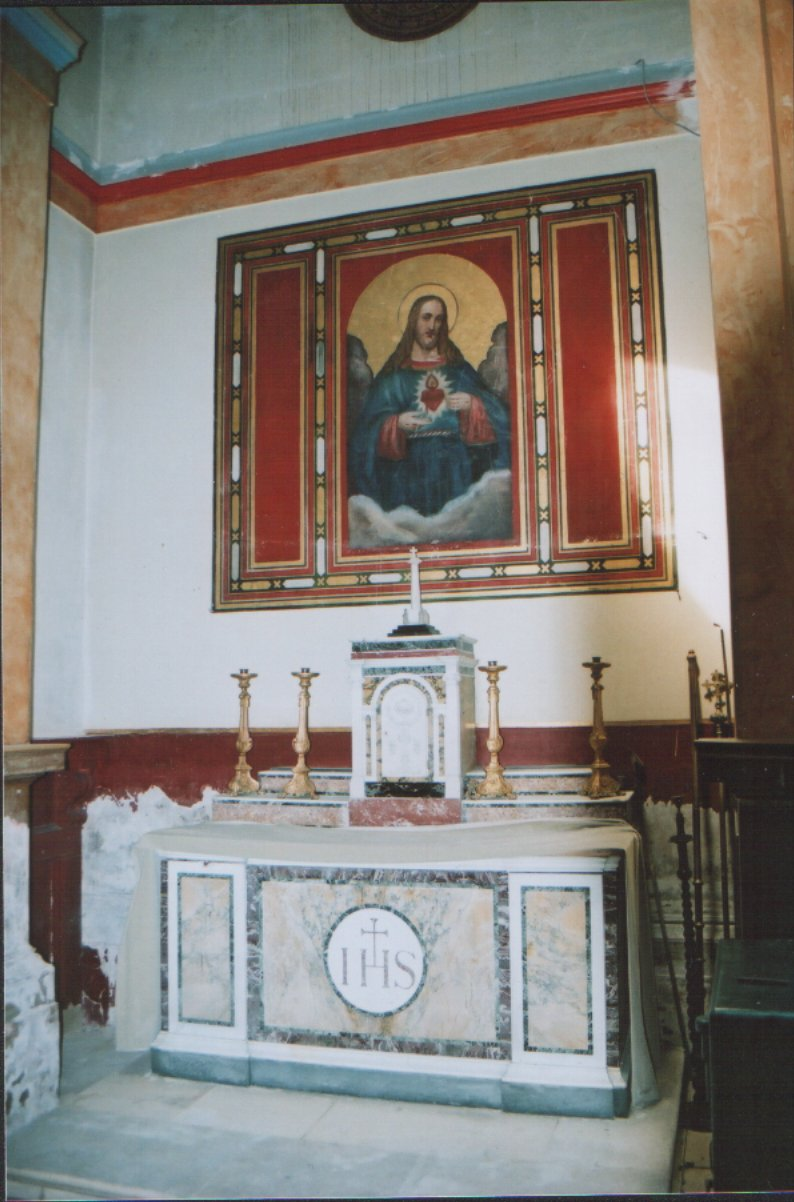
- Side Chapel Altar of St. Mary the Virgin and St. Everilda, Everingham

- Shown within the East Riding of Yorkshire
- OS grid reference: SE804421
- Location: Everingham, East Riding of Yorkshire
- Country: England
- Denomination: Roman Catholic

History
- Status: Private Chapel
- Dedication: St Mary & St Everilda
- Consecrated: 9 July 1839

Architecture
- Functional status: Closed
- Heritage designation: Grade I listed
- Architect: Agostino Giorgioli
- Architectural type: Italianate-style
- Years built: 1836–1839
- Closed: 2004

Administration
- Province: Liverpool
- Diocese: Middlesbrough

The Chapel of St. Mary the Virgin and St. Everilda, in the village of Everingham in the East Riding of Yorkshire, England, is an impressive Italianate-style Roman Catholic chapel within the Diocese of Middlesbrough. The chapel is owned by the Guest family and is a Grade I listed building, with a fine organ.

== History ==
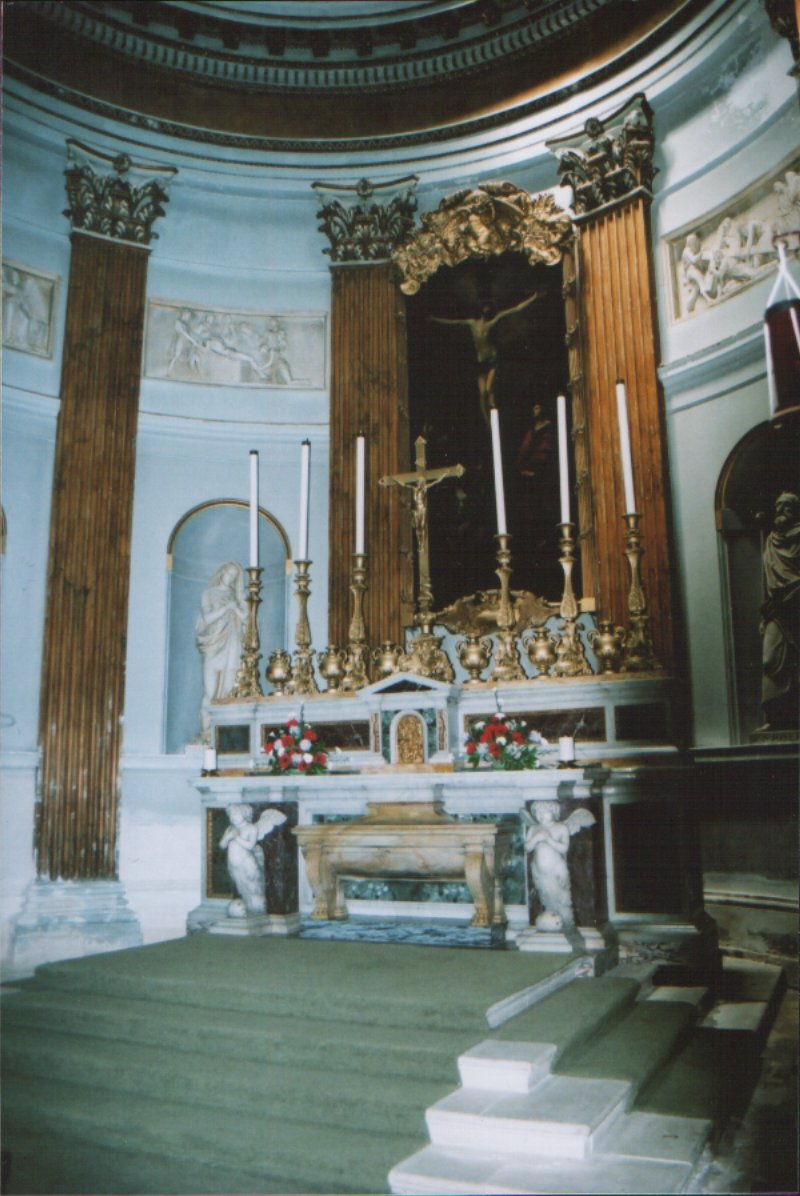
The High Altar of St. Mary the Virgin and St. Everilda, Everingham

The chapel was built between 1836 and 1839, following the passage of the Roman Catholic Relief Act 1829, by William Constable-Maxwell, 10th Lord Herries of Terregles, a descendant of an old recusant family, and of William Haggerston Constable, for whom the adjacent Everingham Hall was built between 1757 and 1764, on a design by John Carr.

Once the Roman Catholic Relief Act was passed, a number of Roman Catholic benefactors offered their assistance, and a large number of churches and chapels were built in the ensuing years. Yorkshire had a long history of recusancy and a large number of families had remained Catholic long after the Reformation, indeed there were entire recusant villages. Everingham was one of these, and the Catholic Church of St. Everilda was built in the grounds of the Hall. Designed in Italy by a young Roman architect, Agostino Giorgioli, its building was supervised by John Harper of York and was modeled on the Maison Dieu at Nîmes.

The church features lofty Corinthian columns on either side of the nave supporting an entablature which in turn supports a deeply coffered barrel ceiling. The apsidal sanctuary has matching Corinthian pilasters and a unique half-dome ceiling. Around the nave are statues of the apostles and there are statues of Our Lady and St Everilda in the sanctuary.

The church was consecrated on 9 July 1839 by Bishop John Briggs, the vicar apostolic of the Northern District, assisted by Andrew Carruthers (titular bishop of Ceramus), John Murdoch (titular bishop of Castabala), James Gillis (titular bishop of Limyra) and thirty-six other clergymen. The ceremony lasted nearly seven hours. A Pontifical Mass was celebrated the following day.

== Interior decoration ==
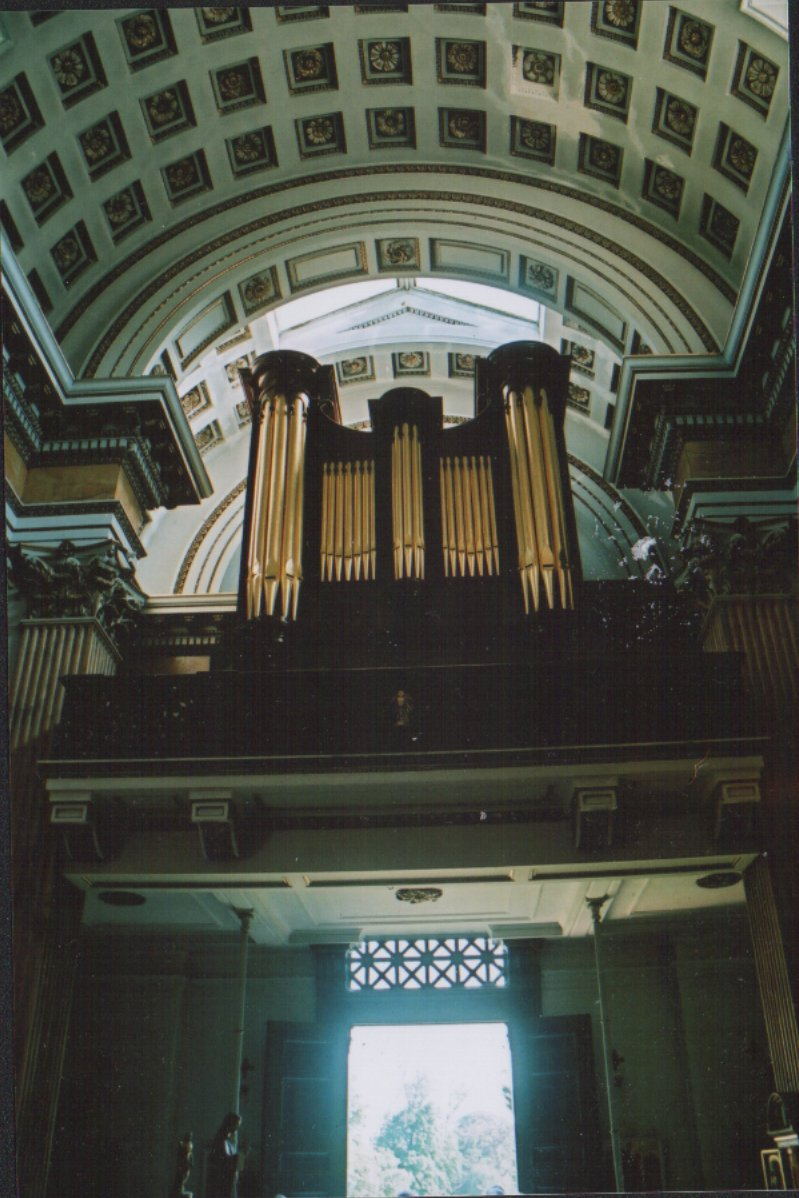
The Organ and Choir Loft of St. Mary the Virgin and St. Everilda, Everingham

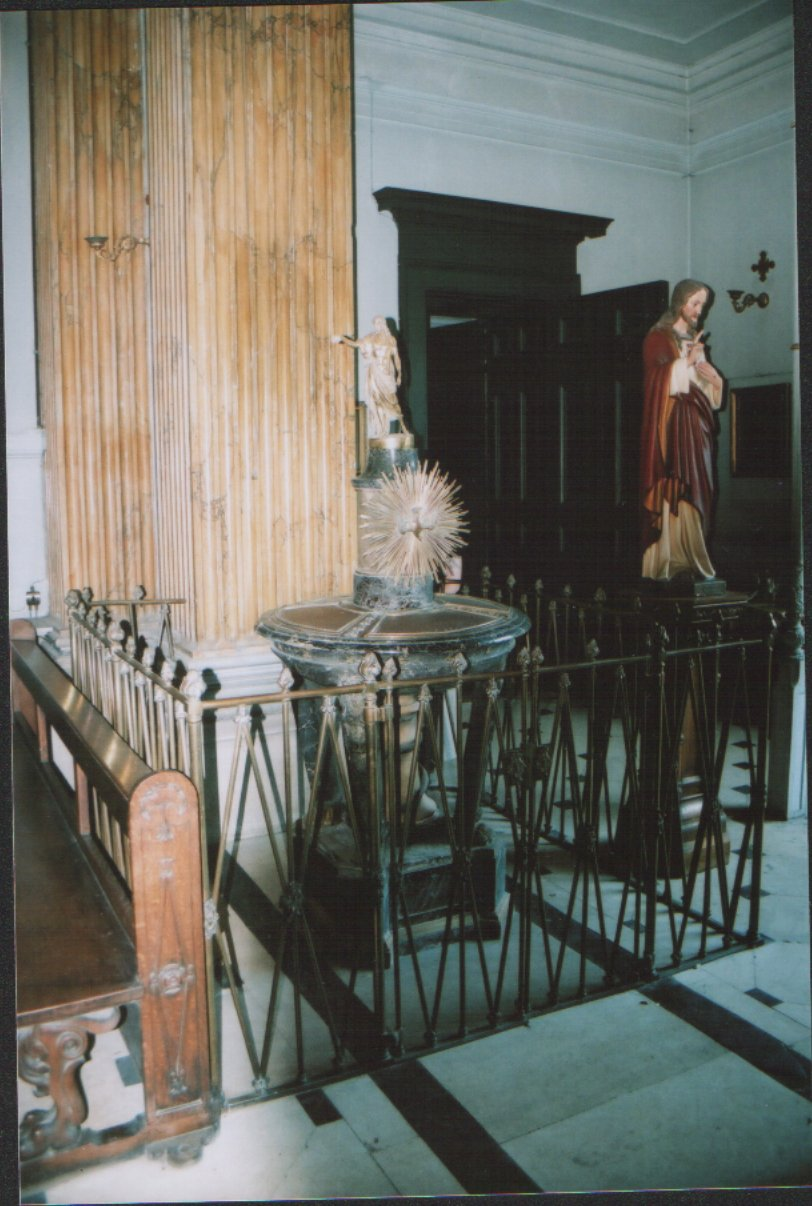
The Font

The long hall is flanked with Corinthian columns, and niches with life-size plaster statues of the Apostles and bas-reliefs of episodes in the life of Christ by Luigi Bozzoni of Carrara. The building is barrel-vaulted, ending in an apse behind the altar, which is of marble inset with panels of polished granite and porphyry. Plenty of 'faux' marbling and real gold leaf adds to the effect, and the acoustics are noteworthy.

The English classical organ, by Charles Allen, is contemporaneous with the chapel, and is on a high west gallery, under the barrel vault. Despite the small specification, the organ is laid out grandly and occupies a large mahogany case with a gilded front (the facade starts at 8' C – the four lowest Open Diapason pipes are inside). The Great Organ is in the obvious place at impost level, and the tiny swell-box is above and behind, with the Pedal Pipes on either side below it. The entire base of the organ is occupied by an enormous double-rise reservoir, roughly four by two metres.

== The chapel today ==
The Roman Catholic parish of Everingham was closed in 2004 but the church is still used by the diocese and masses are regularly celebrated in the church. The Institute of Christ the King Sovereign Priest offered to take over the Church and supply a priest to serve it but this offer was controversially refused by the Bishop of Middlesbrough, John Patrick Crowley, at a time when the diocese was complaining of a shortage of clergy.

== See also ==
- Grade I listed churches in the East Riding of Yorkshire
